= Nougat =

Confection

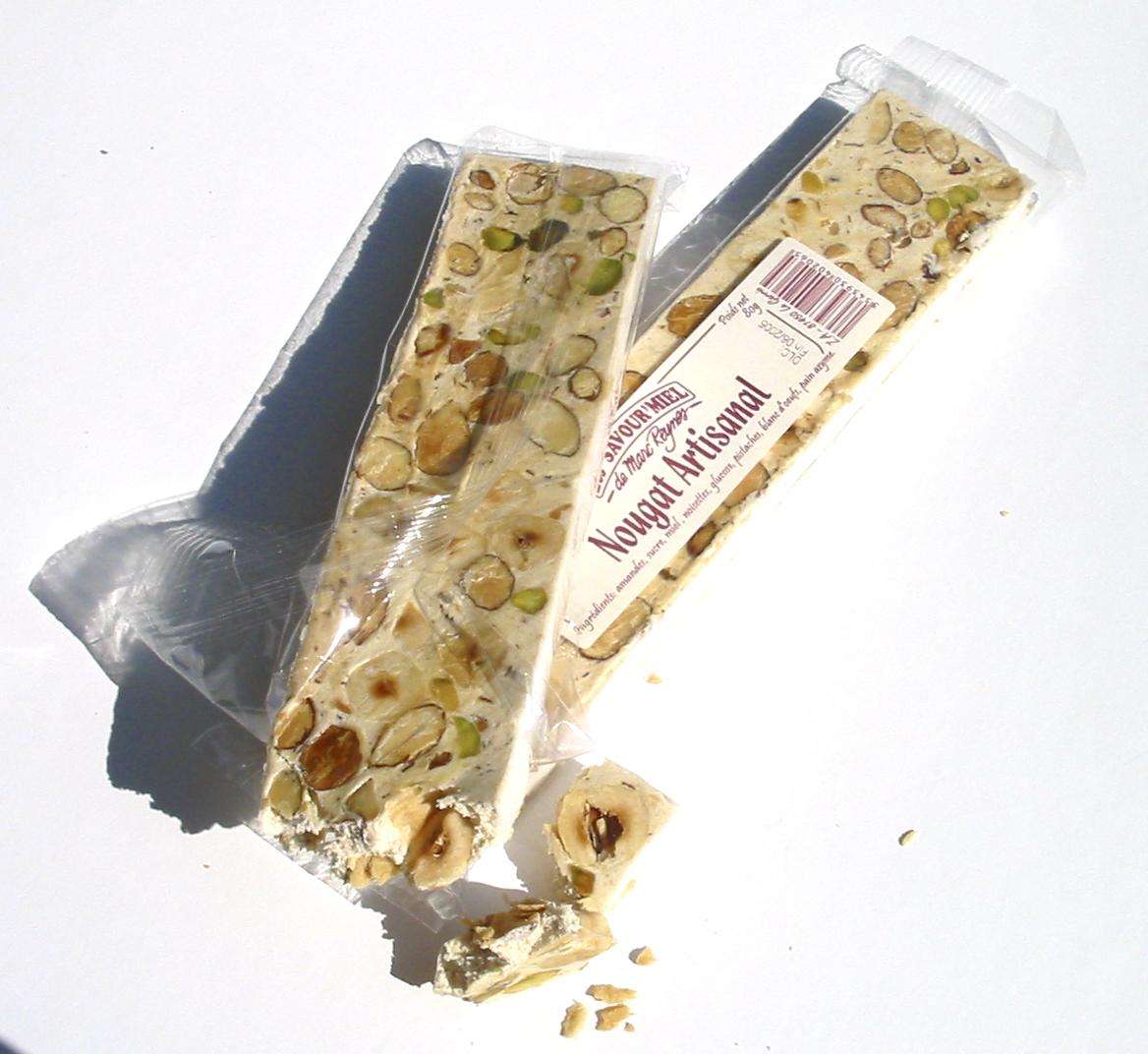
- Artisanal nougat from Le Garric, France
- Type: Confection
- Main ingredients: Western & Southern European: Whipped egg white, honey and/or sugar, nuts Central & Northern European: Gianduja (cocoa & pulverized hazelnut); American: Corn syrup or sucrose, whipping agent, vegetable fats, milk powder, preservatives
- Variations: Montélimar nougat (France), turrón (Spain), torrone and mandorlato (Italy), Viennese nougat (Central & Northern Europe), gaz (Iran)
- Food energy (per 100 serving): 398 kcal (1,670 kJ)

Nougat refers to a variety of soft, chewy or crunchy confections made from sugar, honey or syrup combined with nuts, egg white, cocoa, milk powder, candied fruits, and/or other ingredients. The main colour is usually white or brown.

Nougat is typically eaten either on its own or in candy bars or chocolates. In some places it is an everyday item of confectionary, in others it is associated with particular religious festivals.

The usual version in Western and Southern Europe is made from a mousse of whipped egg white sweetened with sugar or honey. Various nuts and/or pieces of candied fruit are added to flavor and texture the resulting paste, which is allowed to harden and then cut into pieces for serving. Forms of this confection are first attested in Middle Eastern cookbooks during the Middle Ages, but it was greatly popularized as the French Montélimar nougat in the 19th century. Similar confections are staples of regional Iranian cuisine.

In the United States, nougat more often refers to a softer brown paste made in industrial settings, used as a filling in commercial candy bars, frequently in combination with milk chocolate, caramel, and peanuts. In Central and Northern Europe, the name nougat likewise refers to brown paste blended without egg whites, consumed on its own. This brown nougat is usually crunchy, with a softer variant known as Viennese nougat.

== Names ==
English nougat was borrowed in the early 19th century from French nougat, whose pronunciation /nuɡa/ is approximated in English as /ˈnuːɡɑː/ (NOO-gah). The spelling pronunciations /ˈnʌɡɪt/ (NUH-git, cf. nugget) and /ˈnuːɡət/ (NOO-gət) have also become common in British and American English respectively, the latter being the standard American form.

The French name was borrowed in turn from Old Occitan nogat ([nuˈɣat] or [nuˈga]), meaning "nutty" or "thing with nuts". Cognate words in medieval Catalan and Castilian referred to nutty sauces before being adapted to reference the confection.

English also occasionally uses local names for specific varieties of nougat, such as turrón in Spain and torrone in Italy and Brazil. These names derive from Latin torrere ("to roast"). Venetian nougat, known as mandorlato in Cremona, mandulat in Croatia, mantoláto (μαντολάτο) in Greece, and mandolate in Brazil, similarly takes its name from vulgar development of Latin amygdala ("almond"). Maltese (qubbajt) and Sicilian (cubbàita & cupeta) names for nougat derive from Arabic qubbayṭ (قُبَّيْط). Iranian forms—particularly those from the Isfahan region—are known as gaz (Persian: گز) from its incorporation of psyllid honeydew, traditionally misunderstood as astragalus sap.

== History ==
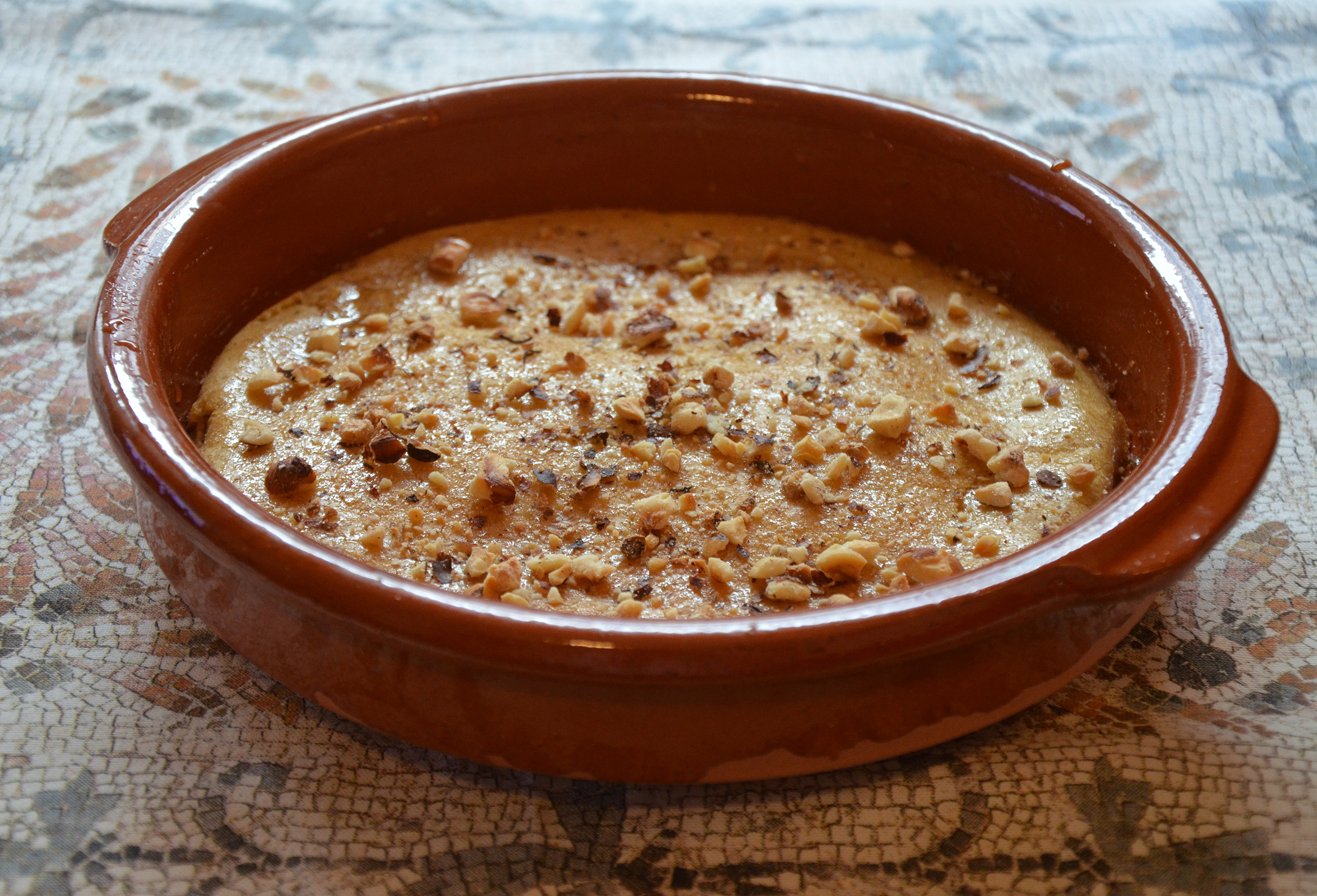
A modern attempt to recreate one of the Apicius recipes, producing something closer to a placenta cake than nougat

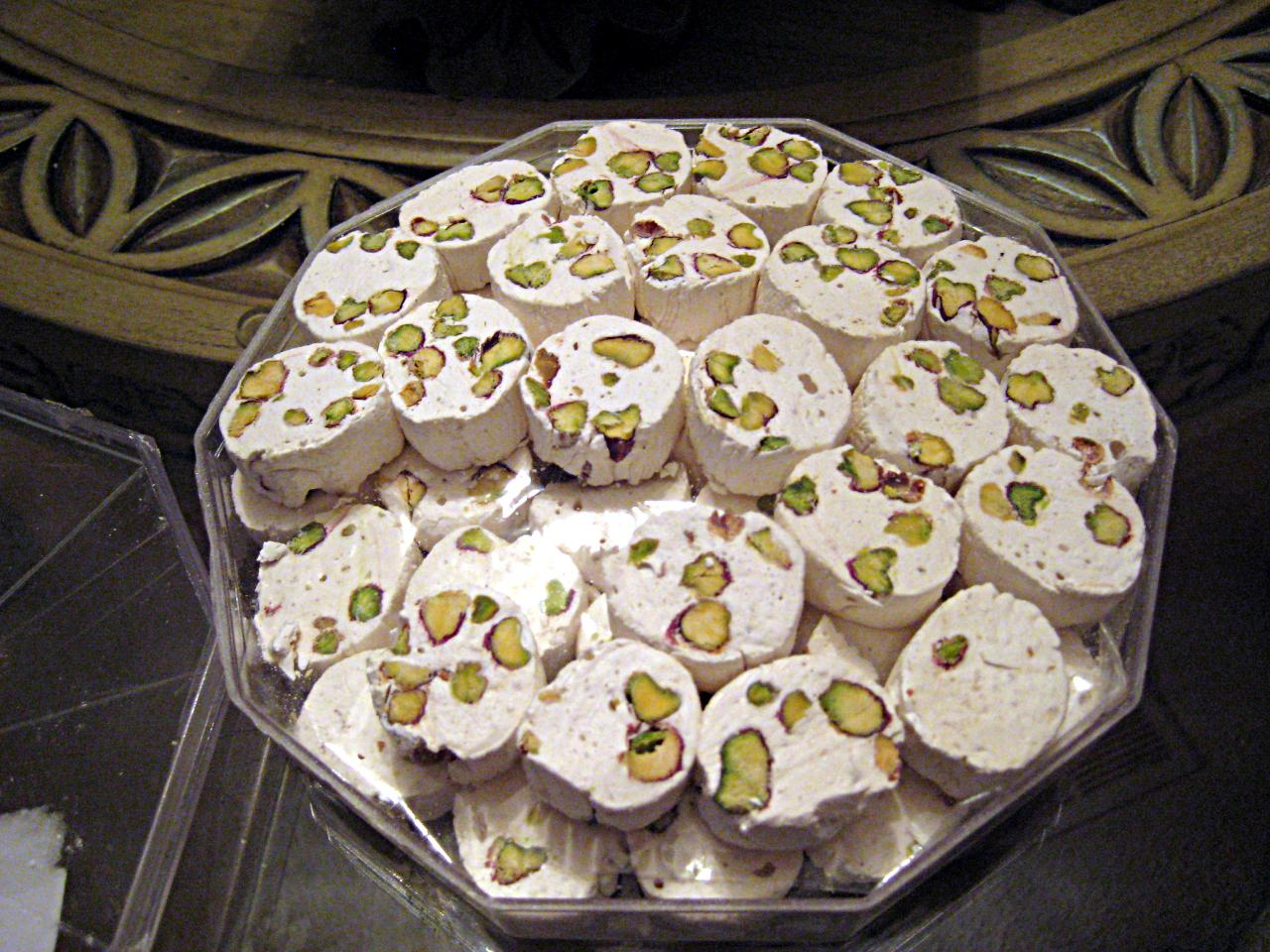
Gaz, Persian nougat from Isfahan, Iran

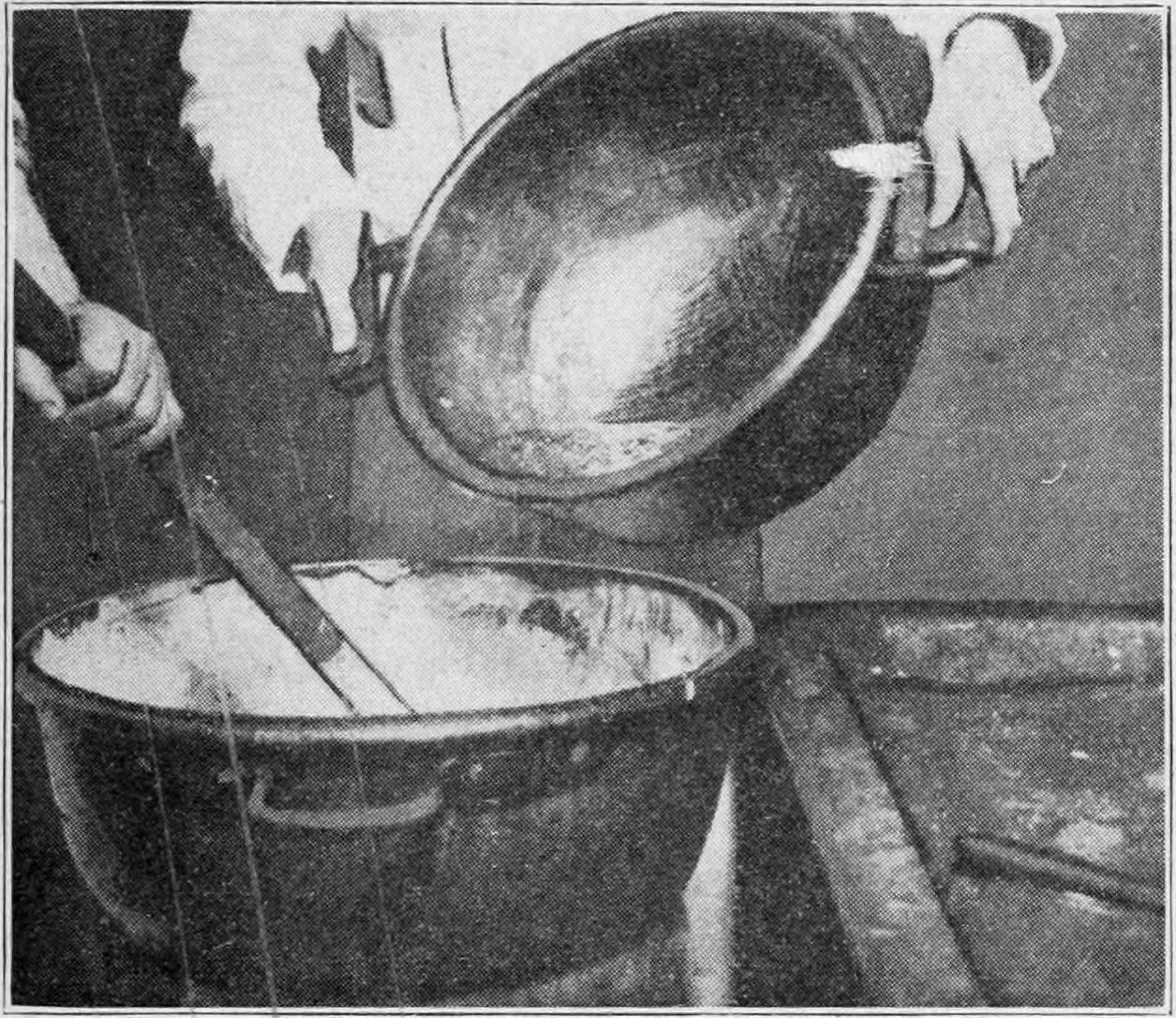
A vat of extremely hot and dense simple syrup being added to egg whites to produce nougat paste

Principally owing to the simplicity of the basic recipe and a similarity between the Latin terms cuppedo and cuppedia, dialectical Italian cupeto and copeta, and the Sicilian terms cubbàita and cupeta, it is sometimes claimed that nougat appears in Roman authors such as Varro, Livy, Martial, Cicero, Aulus Gellius, and Plautus, although the Roman terms as used in those authors were generic words for both sweet and salty delicacies. It is, however, probable that somewhat similar confections were known to the Greeks and Romans. Cato describes a Carthaginian dish made from eggs, honey, flour, and cheese; the Samnites are sometimes credited with an egg, honey, and hazelnut confection; and terse "recipes" in the Apicius—usually taken as walnut, hazelnut, and pine nut custards—may have been kinds of nougat incorporating milk, spices, and oil as one recipe specifically directs cooks to "spread it out on a pan and when cool cut it into handy pieces like small cookies".

Forms of nougat including whipped egg white, sweeteners, and flavorings are more certainly attested in recipes from a 10th-century book written in Baghdad, then the capital of the Abbasid Caliphate. It was known as nāṭif (ناطف), derived from the Arabic triliteral root nṭf (ن ط ف) with the base sense of "dribbling", "trickling", and referencing the paste's viscous mass. The recipes describe the nougat as varieties made in Baghdad (now in Iraq) and Harran (now in southeastern Turkey). Medieval references to nāṭif have been found at locations within the triangle between Urfa, Aleppo, and Baghdad. The related confection Halva is attested in Persia by at least the 9th century, but the manufacture of gaz—a soft Iranian form of pistachio nougat further flavored with the sweet honeydew of the plant lice C. astragalicola and rosewater—is only documented since the late 16th century. The tendency of Arab and Persian cooks to include spices and flower water in their nougats was not replicated in European recipes.

Local legend places the creation of Italian nougat at the festivities marking the marriage of the condottiero Francesco Sforza with the illegitimate daughter of Filippo Visconti, duke of Milan, at Cremona on 25 October 1441, although this seems to be a 20th-century fabrication. However, Gerard of Cremona, one of the Toledo School of Translators, may have mentioned an Arabic form of nougat (turun) in one of his medical translations as early as the 12th century and forms of nougat were being produced in southern Italy and across the Venetian Empire by the early modern period. A separate tradition credits Frederick II and his close ties with southern Italy and Sicilian Arabs with having introduced or reintroduced nougat to Cremona, at the time the most loyal imperial city in Lombardy, during his 13th-century campaigns.

Nougat is first attested in Spain from the 15th century in Enrique de Villena's 1423 Arte Cisoria, a treatise on the use of knives at table. In the 16th century, it appeared in the novels of Miguel de Cervantes and in several recipes, such as those in Lope de Rueda's La Generosa Paliza. It is first attested in Provence in southern France in the 17th century but probably reached Marseille in the mid-16th century. Montélimar nougat, from a town in the Provençal interior, became particularly famous across Europe during the 19th century. It was well-received at the Universal Exposition, the 1878 Paris World Fair, and was assiduously promoted by the town's mayor Émile Loubet, who subsequently became France's prime minister and president in the 1890s and 1900s.

Meanwhile, pulverized flavorings were also creating other colors of nougat, particularly dark nougat with made cocoa powder.

In the early 19th century, Britain's blockade of France and its allies and Napoleon's retaliatory embargo of British goods limited access to pure cocoa and prompted chocolatiers around Turin (at the time annexed to France) to experiment with other fillers including almonds and grains. In 1852, Michele Prochet successfully tried using finely ground roasted hazelnuts, producing Caffarel's gianduiotto chocolates. This cheaper and more readily available flavor became particularly popular in Central and Northern Europe, where hazelnut or hazelnut chocolate nougat has become standard.

The American form of nougat used in candy bars was an accidental creation. In the early 20th century, the Pendergast Candy Company of Minneapolis, Minnesota, produced dark nougat to supply the many German and Scandinavian immigrants who had filled the Midwest. During the early 1920s, one batch of this nougat was made with far too many eggs, producing a much airier confection. Pendergast used this for a walnut-flavored candy bar called the Fat Emma, but its "Minneapolis" or "Minnesota nougat" was soon copied by Frank & Forrest Mars for their extremely successful 1923 Milky Way bar.

== Variations ==
=== White nougat ===
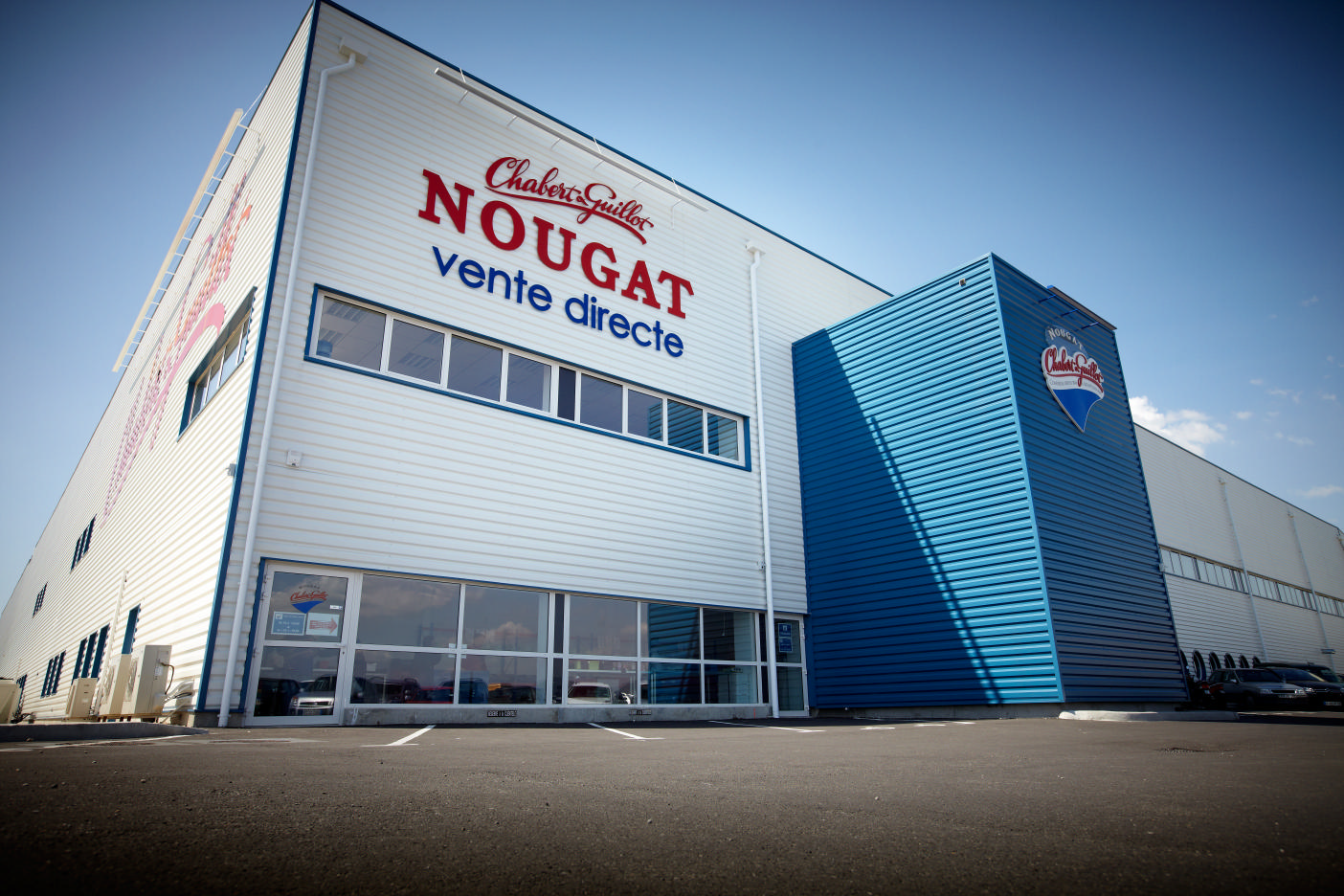
The Chabert & Guillot nougat factory in Montélimar, France (2011)

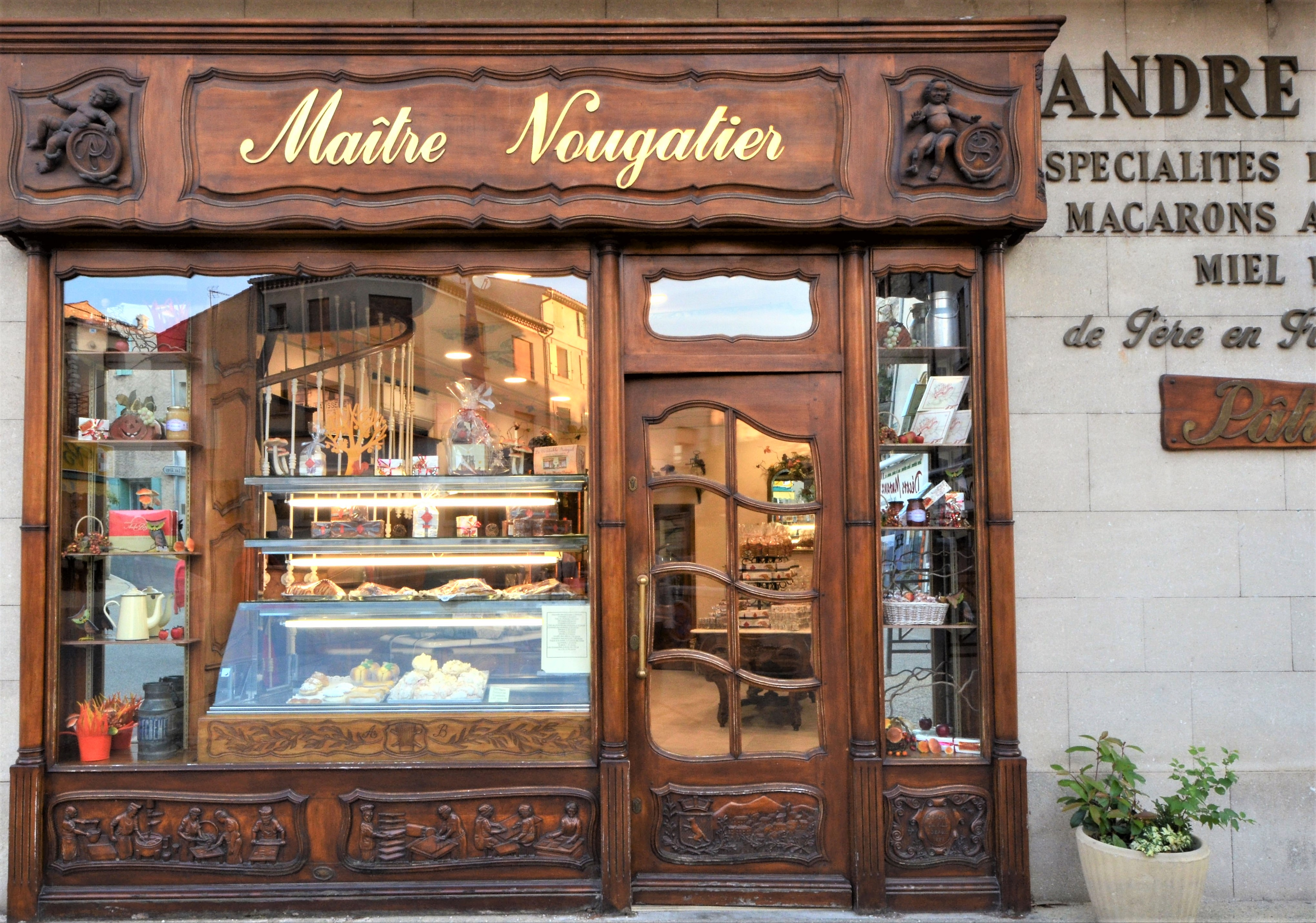
The shop of a master nougatier in Vaucluse, France (2014)

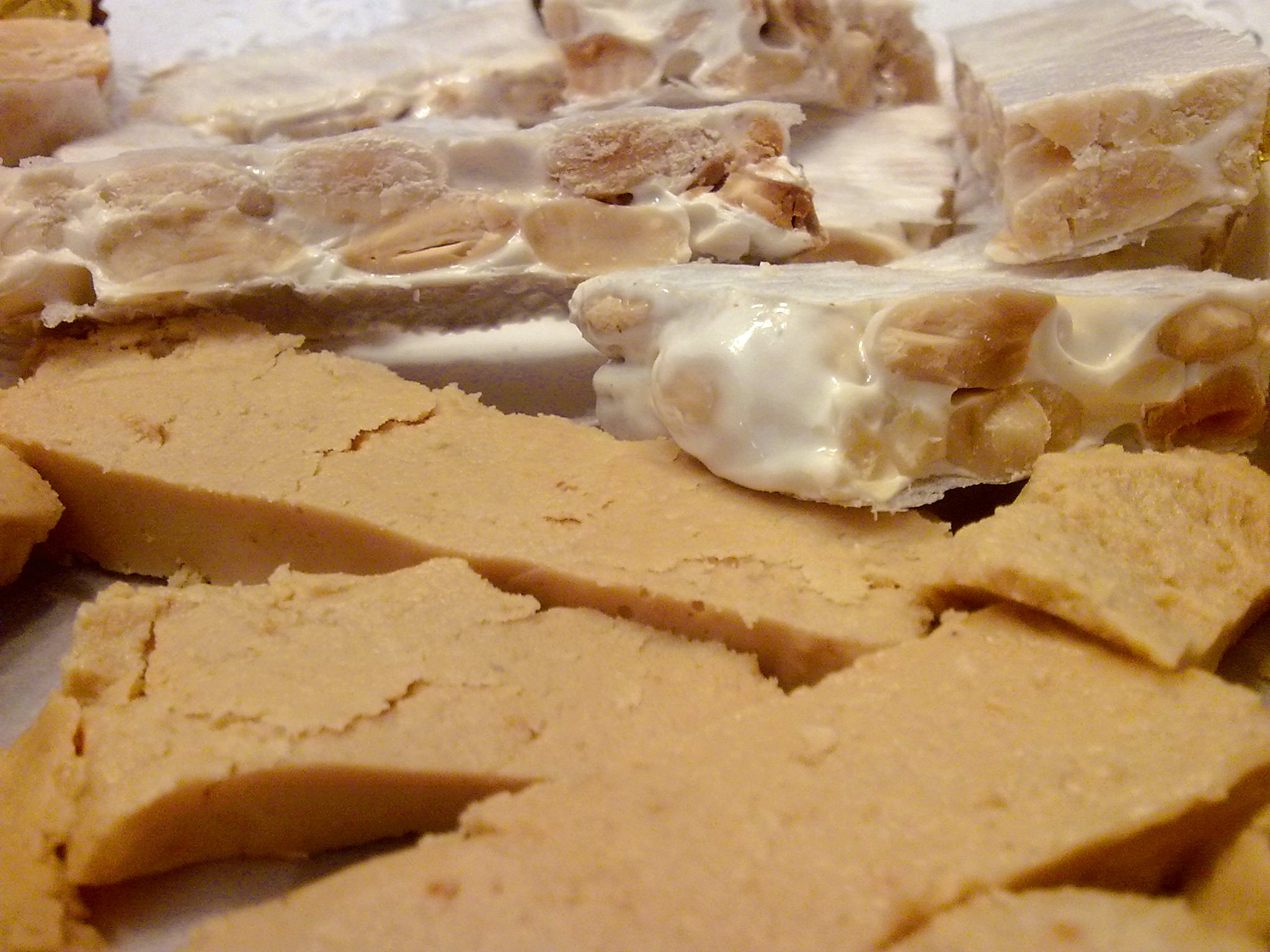
Alicante (top) and Jijona nougat (bottom) from Spain

The usual form of nougat in Western and Southern Europe is made from a mousse of whipped egg white sweetened with sugar or honey. Various nuts including almonds, pistachios, macadamias, hazelnuts, and walnuts and/or pieces of candied fruit are added to the resulting paste, which is allowed to harden and then cut into pieces for serving. It is usually made at home or manufactured at artisan scale by nougat makers, known in French as nougatiers. Some manufacturers wrap nougats in edible wafer paper to ease handling; this can affect the taste depending on its thickness.

The most prominent form of nougat in French cuisine is Montélimar nougat, traditionally made with whipped egg white, sugar, lavender honey, roasted almonds & pistachios, vanilla, and unleavened bread. It received protected status in 2024.

Spanish nougat (turrón) is traditionally made with whipped egg whites, honey, and roasted almonds, with two styles particularly distinguished. Soft (blando) or Jijona nougat (turrón de Jijona) is over 60% almonds by mass but kept mushy or crumbly by the addition of oil to the recipe. Lacking such oil, hard (duro) or Alicante nougat (turrón de Alicante) is extremely firm, particularly when prepared in very thick blocks. Jijona nougat has also received PGI protected status.

Italian nougat (torrone) is likewise made with whipped egg whites, sugar, honey, and roasted almonds but also usually features vanilla or citrus and edible rice paper. Venetian nougat (mandorlato) is similar but generally firmer, with the variety from Cologna Veneta on the Veneto mainland particularly esteemed.

Both Spanish and Italian nougat are prominent components of their cuisine's Christmas meals. In Malta, local nougat is sold at village festivals. In Romania, nougat (alviță) is likewise sold at local festivals and fairgrounds, particularly on the Sunday of Forgiveness preceding Lent.

In Britain, nougat is traditionally made in the style of the southern European varieties, and is commonly found at fairgrounds and seaside resorts. The most common industrially produced type is coloured pink and white, the pink often fruit flavoured, and sometimes wrapped in edible rice paper with almonds and cherries.

French nougat does not have any milk or milk powder ingredients but, when nougat spread to Taiwan, preparers there began to add milk powder as the main ingredient, as well as sugar, cream, marshmallows, nuts (such as peanuts, almonds, walnuts, pistachios or hazelnuts), and dried fruit (such as cranberry and raisins ).Similar forms of nougat are now found throughout mainland China as well.

=== Black nougat ===
Black nougat (nougat noir) is a southern French variant made with only almonds and honey. The almond and honey mixture is cooked until it develops a dark brown appearance. This type of nougat differs from egg-based variants in its amber hue and brittle texture.

=== Whipped nougat ===
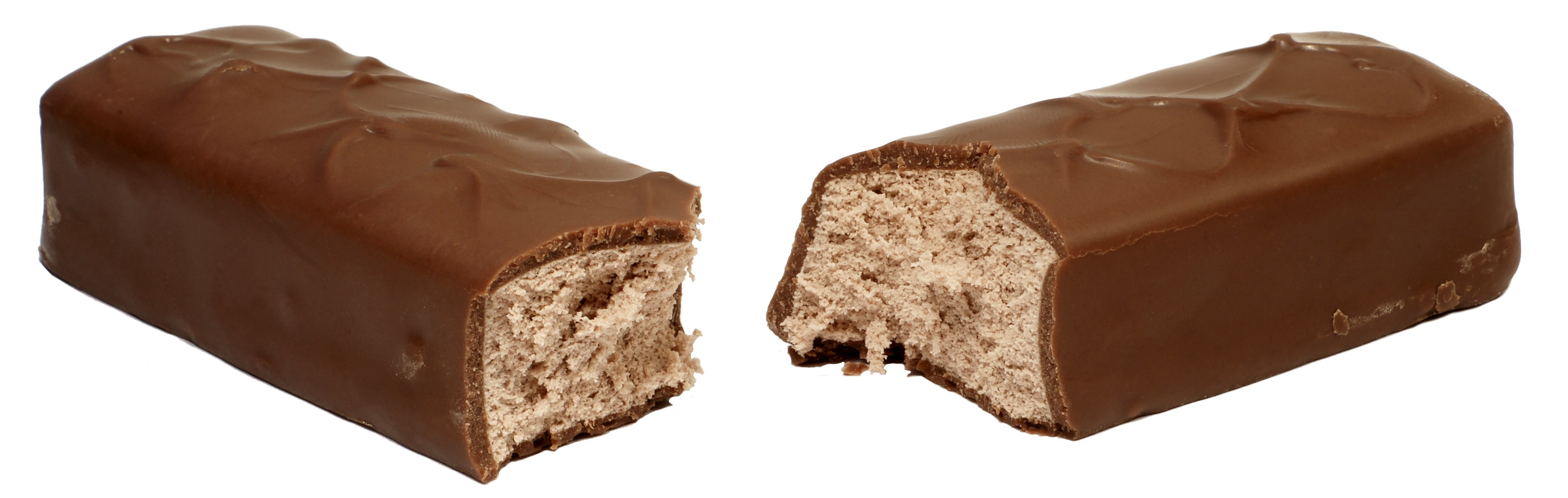
A 3 Musketeers bar, filled with American-style "fluffy nougat"

In the United States, nougat more often refers to a softer brown paste made in industrial settings. It usually consists of corn syrup or sucrose aerated with a whipping agent like hydrolyzed soy protein or gelatine; other components such as vegetable fats, milk powder, and preservatives may be added to impart or enhance desired characteristics. Such nougat is used as a filling in commercial candy bars, frequently in combination with milk chocolate, caramel, and peanuts. Varieties of this nougat are found in Baby Ruth, Double Decker, Fast Break, Milky Way, Moro, Nuts, Snickers, Twin Bing, and Zero bars. Occasionally, American confections feature its form of nougat as their primary component. Especially aerated "fluffy nougat" is the main ingredient in 3 Musketeers candy bars.

=== Chocolate-derived confections ===
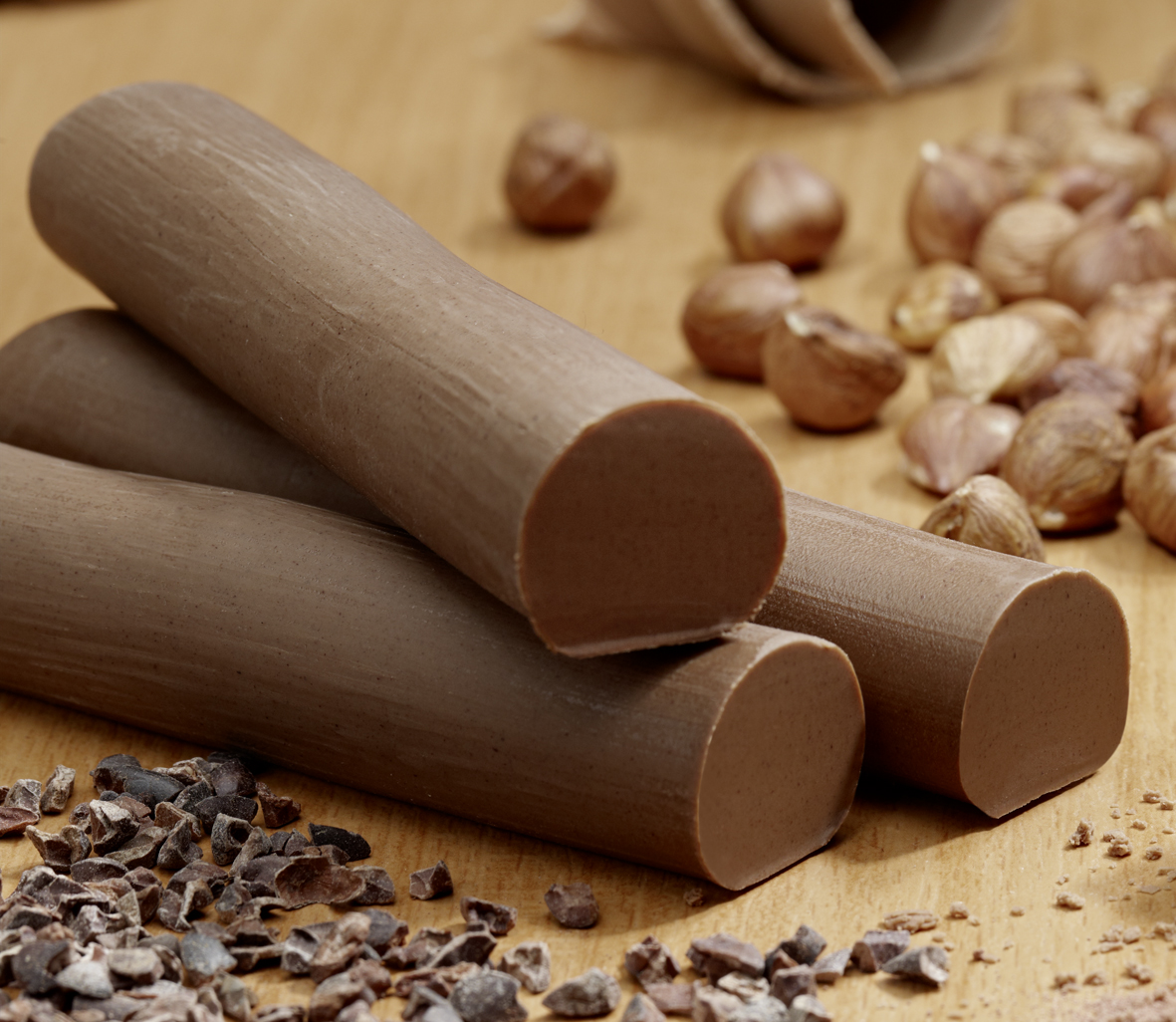
Nougat (or gianduja) is made from chocolate and finely ground nuts

In Central and Northern Europe, the term "nougat" has been confusingly applied to confections (or fillings) made primarily of chocolate and ground nuts, likely derived from Italian gianduja, a blend of chocolate and hazelnut paste. German nougat, in particular, consists of chocolate and ground hazelnuts. Viennese nougat is a similar confection made with ground almonds. Introduced to Finland by Fazer in 1904, it has become a staple Finnish Christmas treat.

In a 1936 technical training sheet, this type of nougat is described as being made by finely grinding Krokant—a confection similar to brittle or nougatine—until it forms a paste. In Central and Northern European contexts, traditional egg-white nougat is therefore distinguished as "French nougat" since the 20th century.

== See also ==
- Divinity, an American confection similar to nougat
- Halva, a Persian confection which may have developed into early forms of nougat
- White Christmas, an Australian confection similar to nougat consumed at Christmas
- Turrón, a Mediterranean nougat confection
