= Astragalus octopus =

Scientific classification
- Kingdom: Plantae
- Clade: Tracheophytes
- Clade: Angiosperms
- Clade: Eudicots
- Clade: Rosids
- Order: Fabales
- Family: Fabaceae
- Subfamily: Faboideae
- Genus: Astragalus
- Species: A. octopus

Binomial name
- Astragalus octopus C.C.Towns.

Synonyms
- Astracantha octopus (C.C.Towns.) Podlech

Species of plant

Astragalus octopus is a species of flowering plant in the family Fabaceae, native to northeastern Iraq and western Iran. A thorny, cushion-forming perennial subshrub closely resembling Astragalus longifolius, it produces a high-quality gum tragacanth.

A slow-growing plant, it eventually reaches 20 to 40 cm (8 to 16 in). Its pollinators are bees and Lepidoptera.
