= Astragalus cerasocrenus =

Scientific classification
- Kingdom: Plantae
- Clade: Tracheophytes
- Clade: Angiosperms
- Clade: Eudicots
- Clade: Rosids
- Order: Fabales
- Family: Fabaceae
- Subfamily: Faboideae
- Genus: Astragalus
- Species: A. cerasocrenus

Binomial name
- Astragalus cerasocrenus Bunge

Species of legume

Astragalus cerasocrenus is a species of milkvetch in the family Fabaceae. Its roots are a source of Gum tragacanth, which has many uses. It is native to Northeast Iran and Southern Turkmenistan. It is most commonly found in the months of May, June, and July.
