= Mouthfeel =

Physical sensations caused in the mouth by food or drink

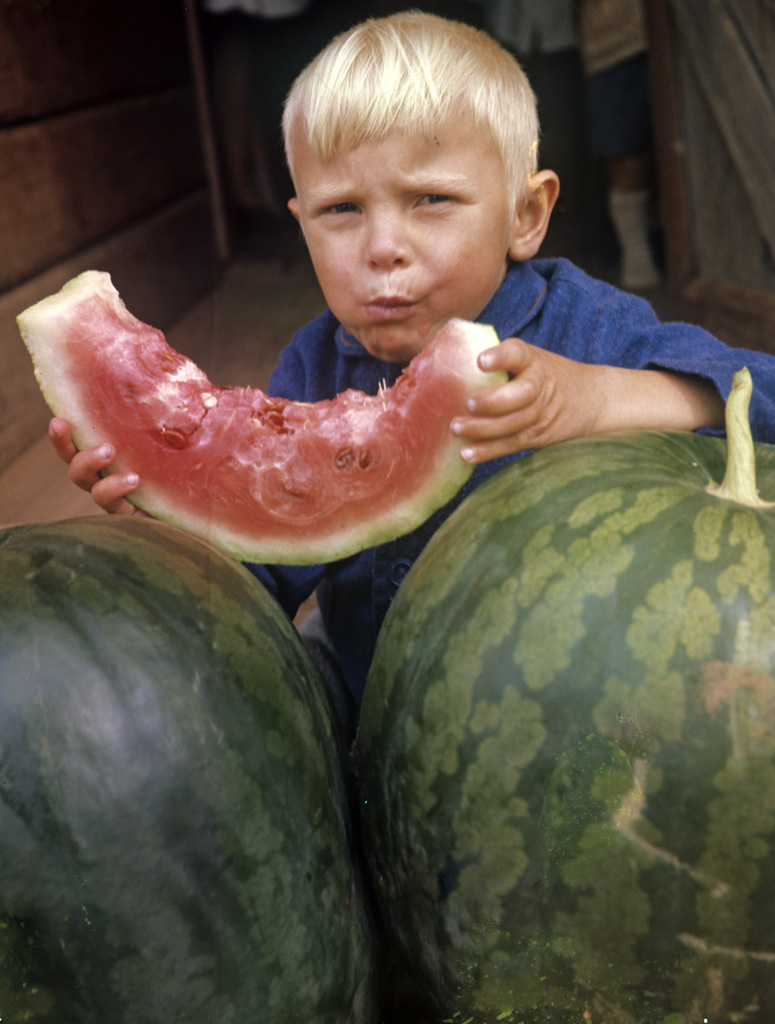
A child bites into a watermelon, experiencing texture sensations such as juiciness

Texture refers to the physical sensations in the mouth caused by food or drink, making it distinct from taste. It is a fundamental sensory attribute which, along with taste and smell, determines the overall flavor of a food item. Texture is also sometimes referred to as mouthfeel.

It is used in many areas related to the testing and evaluating of foodstuffs, such as wine-tasting and food rheology. It is evaluated from initial perception on the palate to first bite, through chewing to swallowing and aftertaste. In wine-tasting, for example, texture is usually used with a modifier (big, sweet, tannic, chewy, etc.) to the general sensation of the wine in the mouth. Research indicates texture and mouthfeel can also influence satiety with the effect of viscosity most significant.

Texture is often related to a product's water activity—hard or crisp products having lower water activities and soft products having intermediate to high water activities.

== Qualities perceived ==
- Chewiness: The sensation of sustained, elastic resistance from food while it is chewed.
- Cohesiveness: The degree to which the sample deforms before rupturing when biting with molars.
- Crunchiness: The audible grinding of a food when it is chewed
- Density: The compactness of cross section of the sample after biting completely through with the molars
- Dryness: The degree to which the sample feels dry in the mouth
- Exquisiteness: The perceived quality of the item in question
- Fracturability: The force with which the sample crumbles, cracks or shatters – Fracturability encompasses crumbliness, crispiness, crunchiness and brittleness.
- Graininess: The degree to which a sample contains small grainy particles
- Gumminess: The energy required to disintegrate a semi-solid food to a state ready for swallowing
- Hardness: The force required to deform the product to a given distance, i.e., force to compress between molars, bite through with incisors, compress between tongue and palate
- Heaviness: The weight of product perceived when first placed on tongue
- Juiciness
- Moisture absorption: The amount of saliva absorbed by product
- Moisture release: The amount of wetness/juiciness released from sample
- Mouthcoating: The type and degree of coating in the mouth after mastication (for example, fat/oil)
- Roughness: The degree of abrasiveness of product's surface perceived by the tongue
- Slipperiness: The degree to which the product slides over the tongue
- Smoothness: The absence of any particles, lumps, bumps, etc., in the product
- Tenderness: The opposite of hardness; ease of chewing
- Uniformity: The degree to which the sample is even throughout or the homogeneity of the sample
- Uniformity of bite: The evenness of force throughout the bite
- Uniformity of chew: The degree to which the chewing characteristics of the product are even throughout mastication
- Viscosity: The force required to draw a liquid from a spoon over the tongue
- Wetness: The amount of moisture perceived on product's surface

== See also ==
- Food
- Psychorheology
- Umami
- Wine tasting
- Q. texture
