= Diatragacanth =

In pre-modern medicine, the name diatragacanth was applied to certain powders that contain the natural gum tragacanth as its basis. There are two kinds: cold and hot.

Powder of cold diatragacanth is composed of the gums tragacanth and Arabic, liquorice, starch, white poppy seed, and the four great cold seeds (cucumber, gourd, watermelon, and melon). It was said to be good thicken, and soften the too sharp, and subtile serous humours occurring in the chest, to assuage coughs, and promote spitting.

Powder of hot diatragacanth is composed of gum tragacanth, cinnamon, hyssop, almonds, linseed, and fenugreek, liquorice, juice of liquorice, and ginger. It was said to be good against asthmas, to promote expectoration, strengthen the stomach, and assist in digestion.
