= Viennese nougat =

Type of nougat

Viennese nougat (German: Wiener Nougat) is a kind of confectionery. Named for its association with Vienna, Viennese nougat is a softer form of the brown Central and Northern European kind of nougat. It is generally made from sugar, cocoa, and almond without the whipped egg white common in Western European nougat.

== Finland ==
Viennese nougat was introduced to Finland by Karl Fazer in 1904. It has been commercially produced as "Wiener Nougat" by his confectionery company Fazer since 1910 and remains a popular Christmas treat. The original recipe's cocoa butter was replaced with cheaper palm oil in 2014. The product's packaging has varied over the years: It was originally packaged in a silver wrapper, then changed to blue and yellow in the 1970s, and then to white and gray in the 2000s.
