= Crispiness =

Food texture that emits sound upon fracture

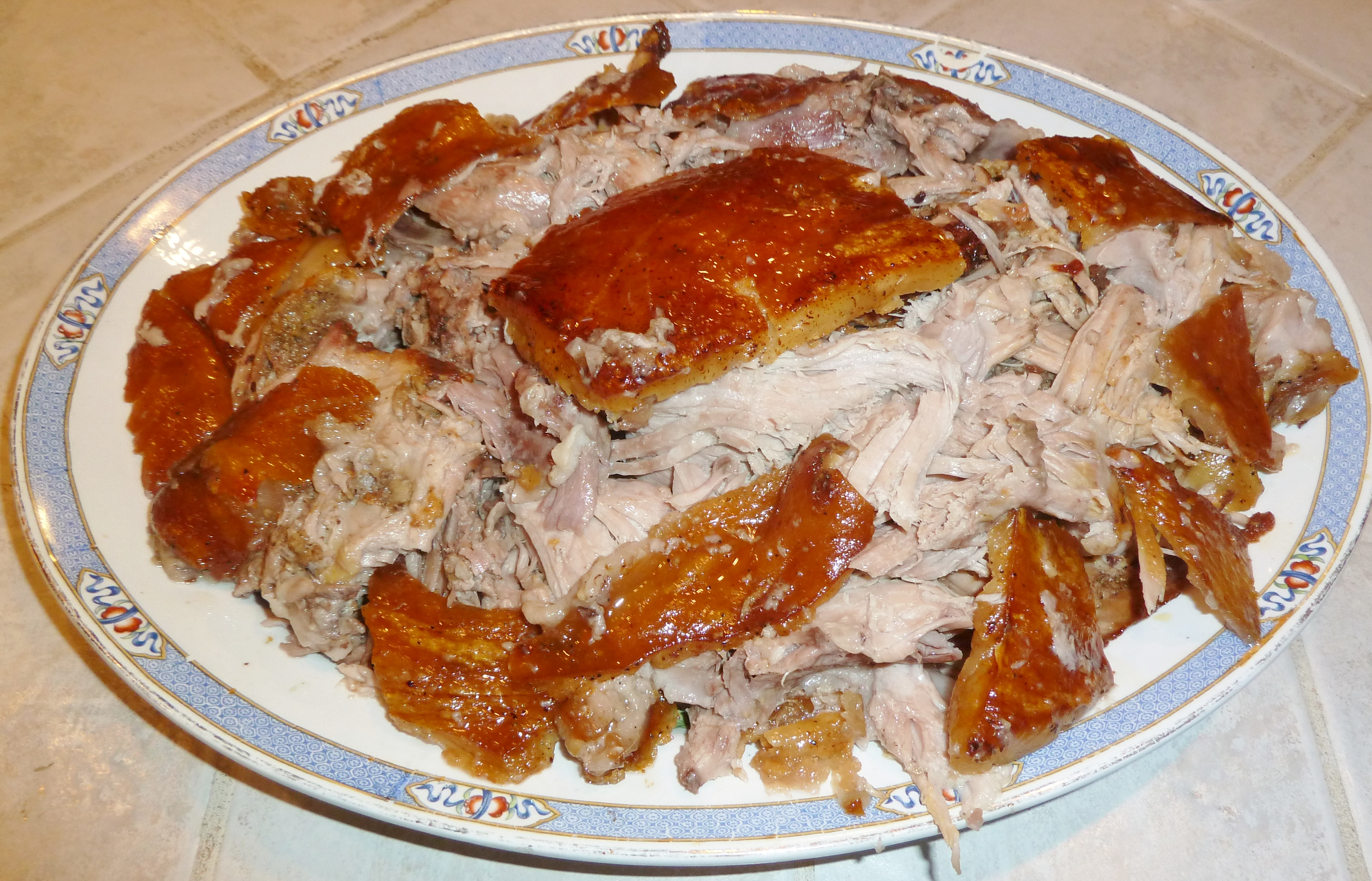
Skin chips of pernil should be crispy

Crispiness or crispness is one of the most common food texture attributes. Crispiness refers to a hard food that emits a sound upon fracturing. Foods described as crisp tend not to show signs of deformation prior to fracture. Crispiness and crunchiness are often used interchangeably, however crispiness tends to be associated with a higher pitched sound, while crunchiness is associated with lower pitched sounds.

== Cooking techniques for crispiness ==
There are a number of techniques to achieve crispiness when cooking. Frying food can make it crispy, such as seen in french fries. A breading coating using flour, egg wash, and bread crumbs will provide a layer of crispiness. Baking and roasting impart crispiness, as well, as noted in the skin of Peking duck, porchetta or pernil.

Crispiness is lost when food items are heated in the microwave oven as microwaves heat water within the food that then makes the food margins soggy.
