= Montélimar nougat =

Type of French confection

Montélimar nougat (French: nougat de Montélimar) is the form of nougat particularly associated with the town of Montélimar in southeastern France.

== History ==
Legend has it that Olivier de Serres (1539–1619) had almond trees planted in the region near Montélimar to make nougat, but almond trees had been cultivated in Provence since at least the 14th and 15th centuries, and between 1474 and the middle of the 16th century, the Lyon fairs already marketed almonds from Drôme and Ardèche.

The Classical Latin term nux ("walnut") became nuca ("nut") in vulgar Latin, then noga in Old Provençal. This gave the confection the local name nogat ("nutty"), which became nougat in standard French. Nogat was attested in 1607 in the Thresor de santé, a book on dietetics, to designate a confectionery from Provence and Languedoc.

The Montélimar nougat is composed of almonds, honey, and a light mousse of egg whites. The latter lightens the dough and gives it its traditional whitish colour. Traditionally, nougat was baked at home, not by skilled nougat makers (in French nougatiers).

In 1701, when they were coming back from Spain on horseback, Louis, Duke of Bourgogne, and Charles, Duke of Berry stopped in Montélimar. The inhabitants offered them one quintal of Nougat (equivalent to 95 lb or 43 kg). The sweet's reputation spread from this point.

The success of Montélimar nougat is mainly due to Montélimar's mayor, Émile Loubet, who was later elected its representative and then Prime Minister and President (1899–1906) of France. During this period, he undertook a huge campaign promoting the nougat. It was very well-received at the Universal Exposition, the 1878 Paris World Fair, with a Lancet reviewer calling it—though "little known" in Britain at the time—"one of the very nicest and most delicious sweetmeats with which we are acquainted". As president, Loubet offered it to all crowned royalty in France, as well as to foreign Presidents coming to the Élysée Palace. Through these efforts, the reputation of nougat became international.

In 1968 the A7 autoroute was built and the Nougatiers took advantage of this opportunity. They set up shop in the Montélimar rest area, which is the largest in Europe, and sold their nougat to travellers passing by.

In 1993 the Nougatiers Federation applied for Nougat de Montélimar to be designated a Protected Geographical Indication (PGI). The application was granted in February 2003.

In Montélimar, there are still dozens of Nougatiers. The annual production is around 4,500 tons, and the Nougat industry employs about 300 workers.

== Trivia ==
The "Montélimar" is famously cited among a variety of candy flavours in the Beatles' song "Savoy Truffle", written by George Harrison and recorded on their 1968 album The Beatles (also known as "the White Album").

Georges Brassens mentions Montélimar nougat in his song "Montélimar".

== Sources ==
- Everett, Walter (1999). The Beatles as Musicians: Revolver Through the Anthology. New York, NY: Oxford University Press. ISBN 0-19-512941-5.
