= Gaz (candy) =

Iranian pastry

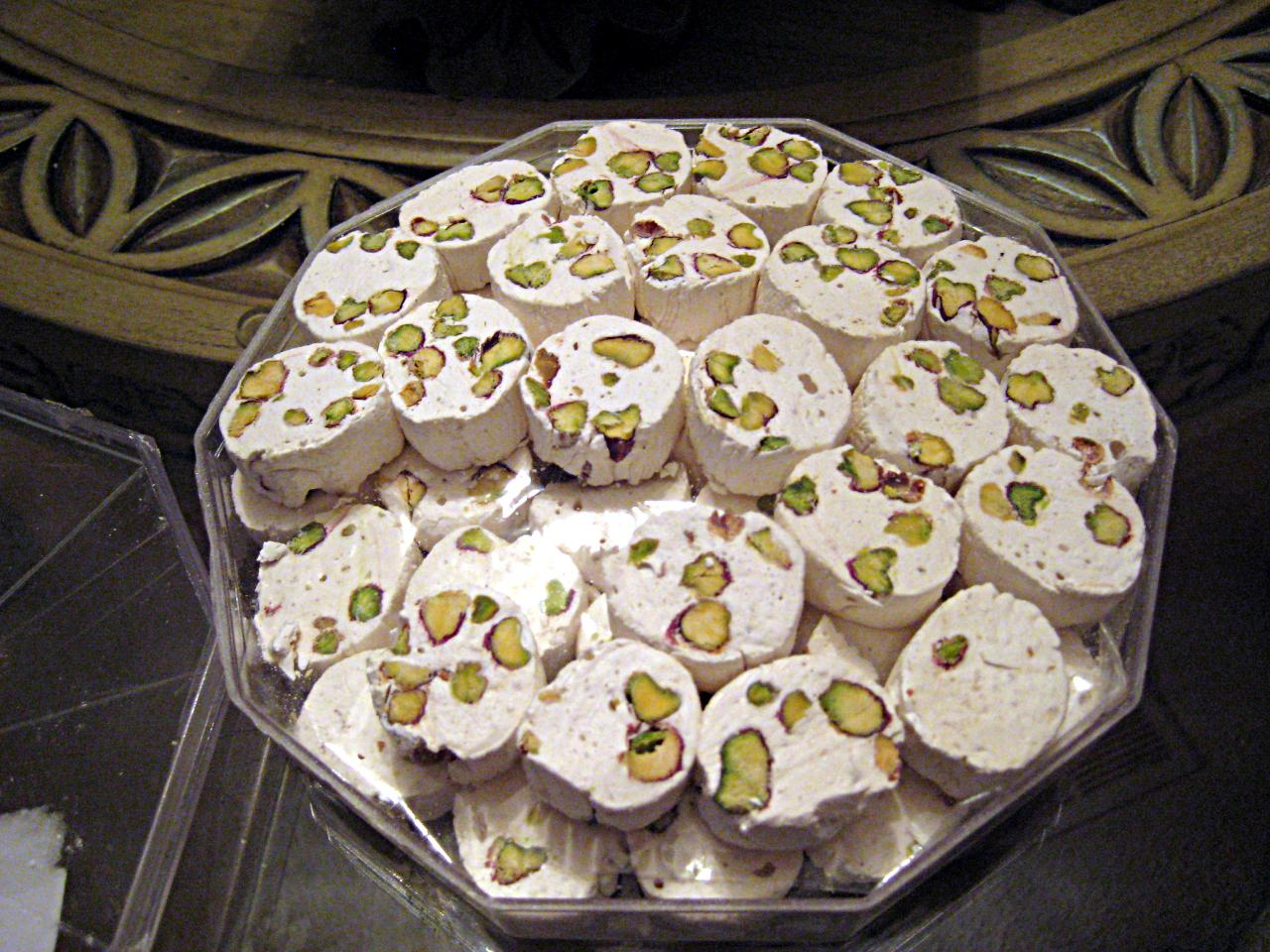
- Gaz of Isfahan
- Type: Nougat
- Place of origin: Iran (Persia)
- Region or state: Isfahan
- Main ingredients: sugar or corn syrup, pistachio or almond kernels, rosewater and egg whites

Gaz (Persian: گز) is an Iranian nougat that originated in the Isfahan region. It is widely known as Persian Nougat in American and European countries. It is made from egg whites, sugar, pistachios and/or almonds, rosewater, and (traditionally) psyllid honeydew collected from Persian manna. It has a mild laxative effect, traditionally used for children.

== Name ==
The Persian word gaz (گز) is a clipping of gaz-angobīn ("gaz honey"), in reference to tamarisk and astragalus shrubs native to the Zagros Mountains located to the west of Isfahan. Gaz was traditionally (though mistakenly) understood as the sap of the Persian manna Astragalus brachycalyx, sometimes further mistaken by its shared Persian name with the tamarisk Tamarix gallica.

== History ==
Similar confections known as halva have been made in Persia since around the 9th century Saffarid period.

The modern form of gaz dates backs 450 years to the Safavid period, the honeydew found on Persian manna being combined with egg white, sugar, glucose syrup, rosewater, and pistachios and/or almonds in traditional and industrial workshops. The sweet, milky honey (angobīn) found on the gaz plant is associated with manna, a food mentioned in the religious texts of the Abrahamic religions. Under Qajar rule, gaz was provided by local magnates as a gift to Persian and Ottoman officials.

== Manufacture and style ==
A large bush, the Persian manna reaches a height of about 1 meter (3 ft) and it usually grows in good weather in the Khansar. The hard pods of this shrub become ready to harvest around September and the gray or shiny yellow grains come out in the stems like millet. At this time, the owners of the trees must harvest them before the autumnal rains. Under the traditional cultivation prevailing in the 1950s, each bush yielded about 0.45 kg (1 lb) of raw gaz with Iran's annual production averaging about 50,000 kg (110,000 lb). By 2017, industrialization had raised this level to 450,000 metric tons (500,000 short tons).

Although originally believed to be sap manufactured by the Persian manna shrub or tamarisk tree, the sticky white substance was found to be formed from honeydew, which is exuded from the anus of the nymph of the plant lice Cyamophila astragalicola (previously mistakenly identified as C. dicora) in its final instar. The honeydew is collected annually and combined with other ingredients including pistachio or almond kernels, rosewater, and egg white. Modern versions of gaz frequently use sugar, glucose, and corn syrup as substitutes for psyllid manna.

The traditional way to serve gaz is in round pieces that are about 5 centimeters (2 in) in diameter and up to 1.3 centimeters (0.5 in) thick. A modern presentation is to serve the nougat cut into smaller rectangles. Pieces may be dusted with flour or cornflour to keep them separated and easier to handle. Depending on the added ingredients, gaz can have a subtle rose flavor, a nutty taste, or a savory and pungent profile, and it can be white or another color due to the addition of nuts or of spices such as saffron.

== In different regions ==
Iraqi min alsima candy.

The dessert is made in Iraq and Iraqi Kurdistan where it is known under different local names, like man wa salwā and min al-samā (Arabic: من السما, lit. 'from the sky').

== See also ==
- Halva
- Nougat
- Turrón (Spanish and Italian nougat)
- Divinity (American nougat-like confection)
