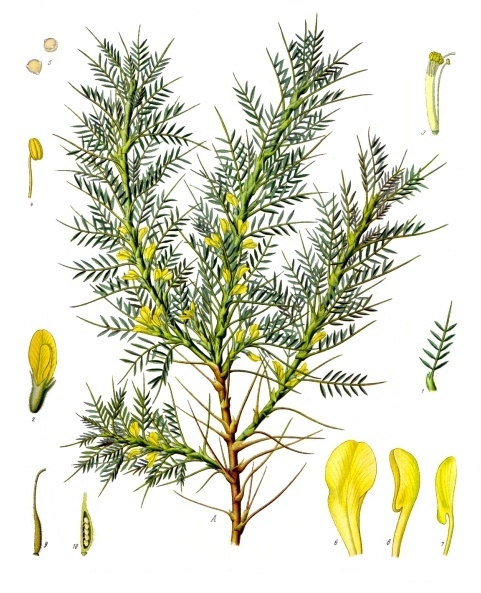

Scientific classification
- Kingdom: Plantae
- Clade: Embryophytes
- Clade: Tracheophytes
- Clade: Angiosperms
- Clade: Eudicots
- Clade: Rosids
- Order: Fabales
- Family: Fabaceae
- Subfamily: Faboideae
- Genus: Astragalus
- Species: A. brachycalyx

Binomial name
- Astragalus brachycalyx Fisch.

Synonyms
- Astragalus adscendens Boiss. & Hausskn. Astracantha adscendens (Boiss. & Hausskn.) Podlech

= Astragalus brachycalyx =

Persian manna

Species of legume native to western Asia

Astragalus brachycalyx, the Persian manna or manna, whose name is derived from the Greek ‘brachy’ meaning "short" and ‘calyx’ meaning the sepal of a flower, is a species of legume commonly found on rocky mountain slopes in western Asia, from western Iran and northern Iraq to Turkey, and is commonly used as a source of gum tragacanth. The sweet honeydew of the plant lice Cyamophila astragalicola secreted onto A. brachycalyx is an essential component of traditional gaz, the Persian form of nougat produced in Isfahan, Iran.
