= Choc Nut =

Philippine candy bar

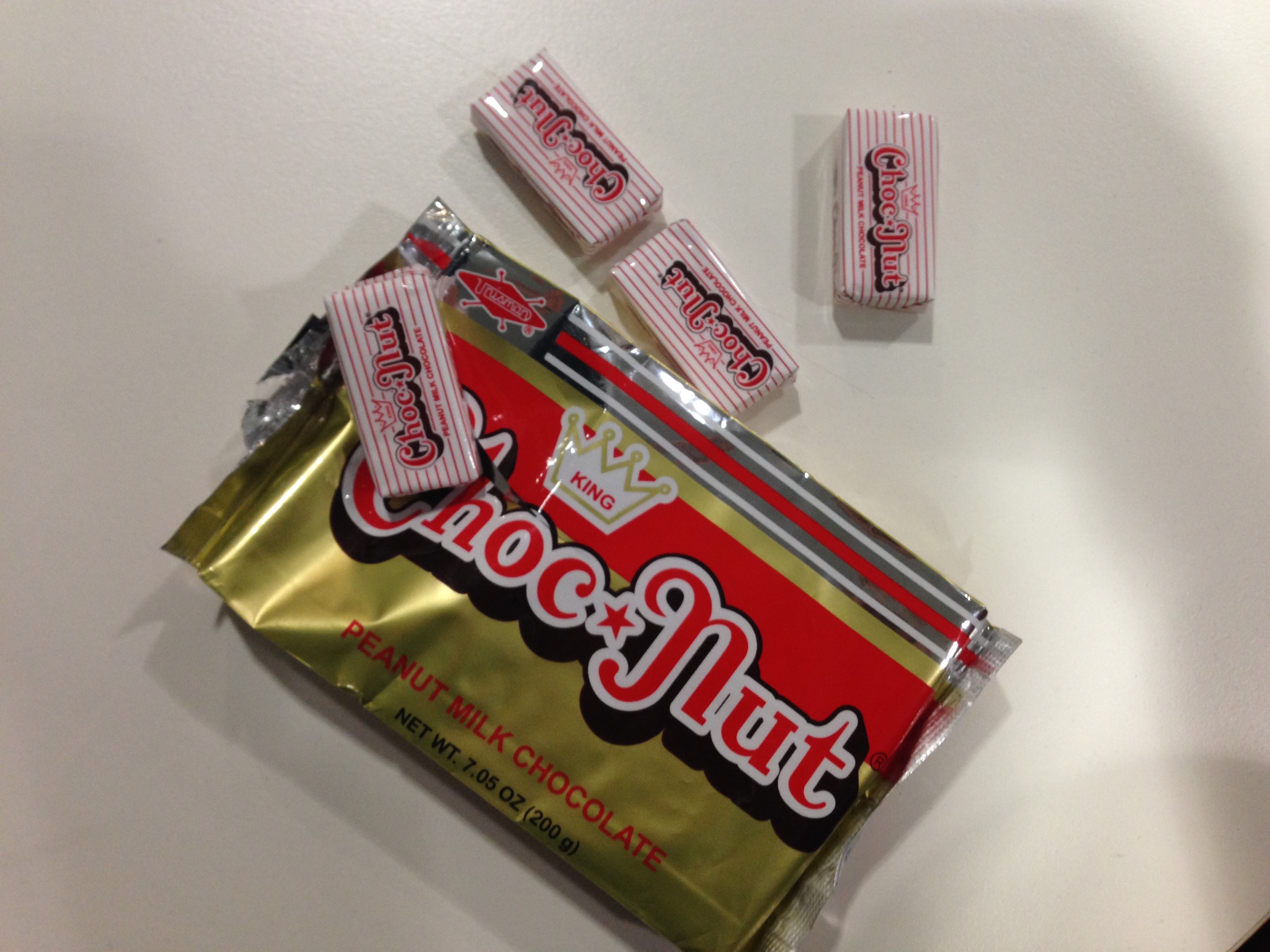
- A bag of Choc Nut and individually-wrapped pieces.
- Product type: Chocolate bar
- Current owner: Annie’s Sweets Manufacturing and Packaging Corporation
- Produced by: Annie’s Sweets Manufacturing and Packaging Corporation
- Country: Philippines
- Previous owners: New Unity Sweets Manufacturing Corporation

Choc Nut (stylized as Choc⋆Nut) is a trademark for a candy bar manufactured by Annie's Sweets Manufacturing and Packaging Corporation, a Philippine-based company. The ingredients of Choc Nut include peanuts, sugar, milk powder, cocoa powder and vanilla. It has endured as one of the country's most-consumed children's snacks. While only mass-produced in the Philippines, many Asian supermarkets and Filipino stores overseas sell the candy. Many restaurants and cafes in the Philippines use Choc Nut as a popular ingredient in confections, drinks, and even cocktails.

== History ==
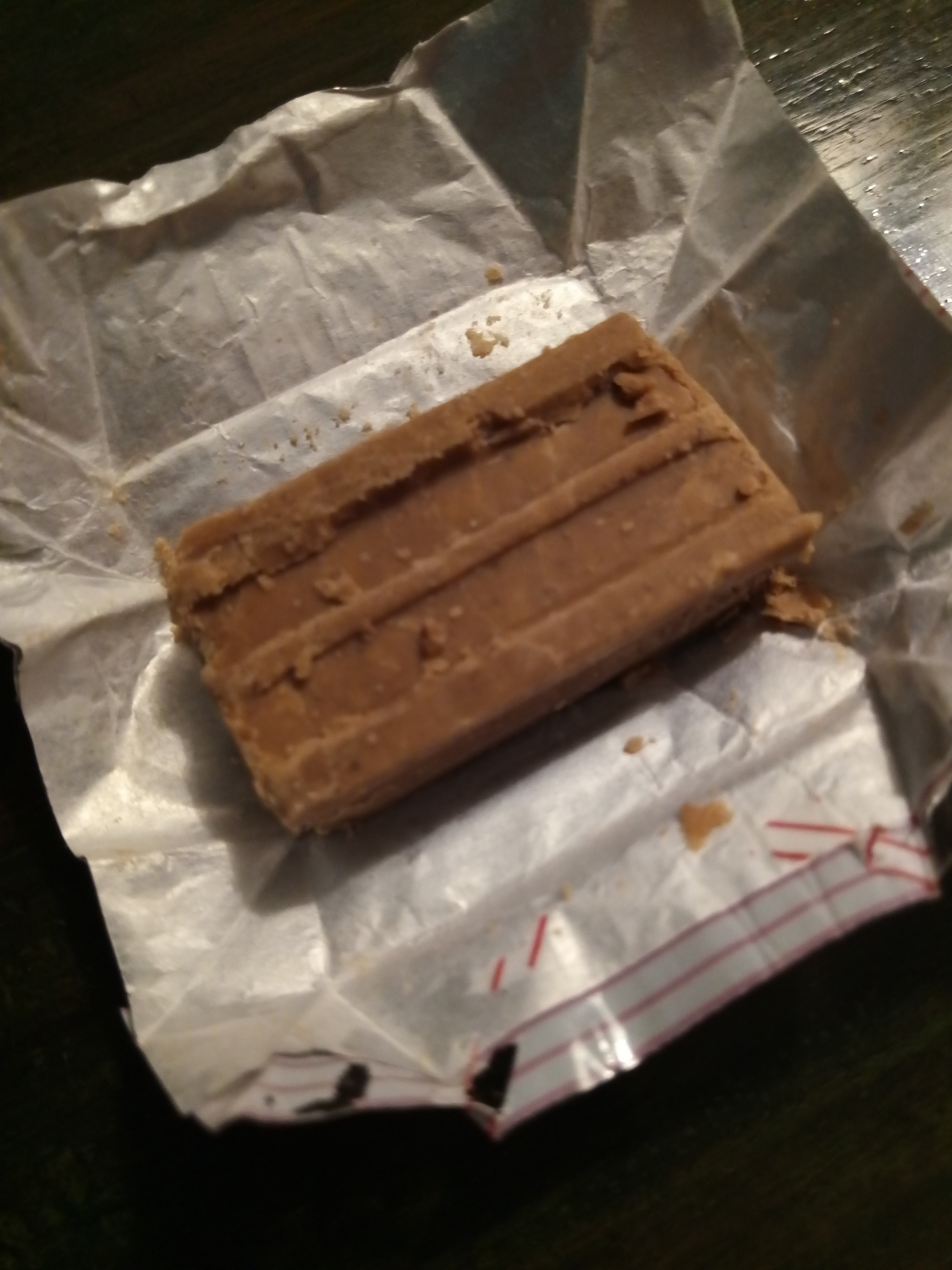
A piece of Choc Nut unwrapped.

Choc Nut was originally manufactured by New Unity Sweets Manufacturing Corporation (Unisman) in Malabon. In 2013, the brand came under the ownership of Annie's Manufacturing and Packaging Corporation, the company that produces Choc Nut's rival brand, Hany.

In 2018, Choc Nut extended its product line to include a sweetened chocolate peanut spread.

== Packaging ==
Choc Nut comes in 24-piece "King" or 16-piece "SP" packages. The 24-piece "King" package consists of twenty-four 8-gram bars, while the 16-piece "SP" package consists of sixteen 16-gram bars. Each bar is individually-wrapped in paper-backed foil and an outer packaging film (white paper during the Unisman era) bearing the brand's logo and signature red stripes. The packages are a bronze colour with white and red lines running through it horizontally.

== In popular culture ==
In recognition of its status as a pop culture icon, Choc Nut was given a prominent role in the graphic novel series Trese by Budjette Tan and Kajo Baldisimo. The references were also picked up in the animated series.

== See also ==
- Masareal
- List of candies
- Sari-sari store
