= Crunchiness =

Characteristic of foods

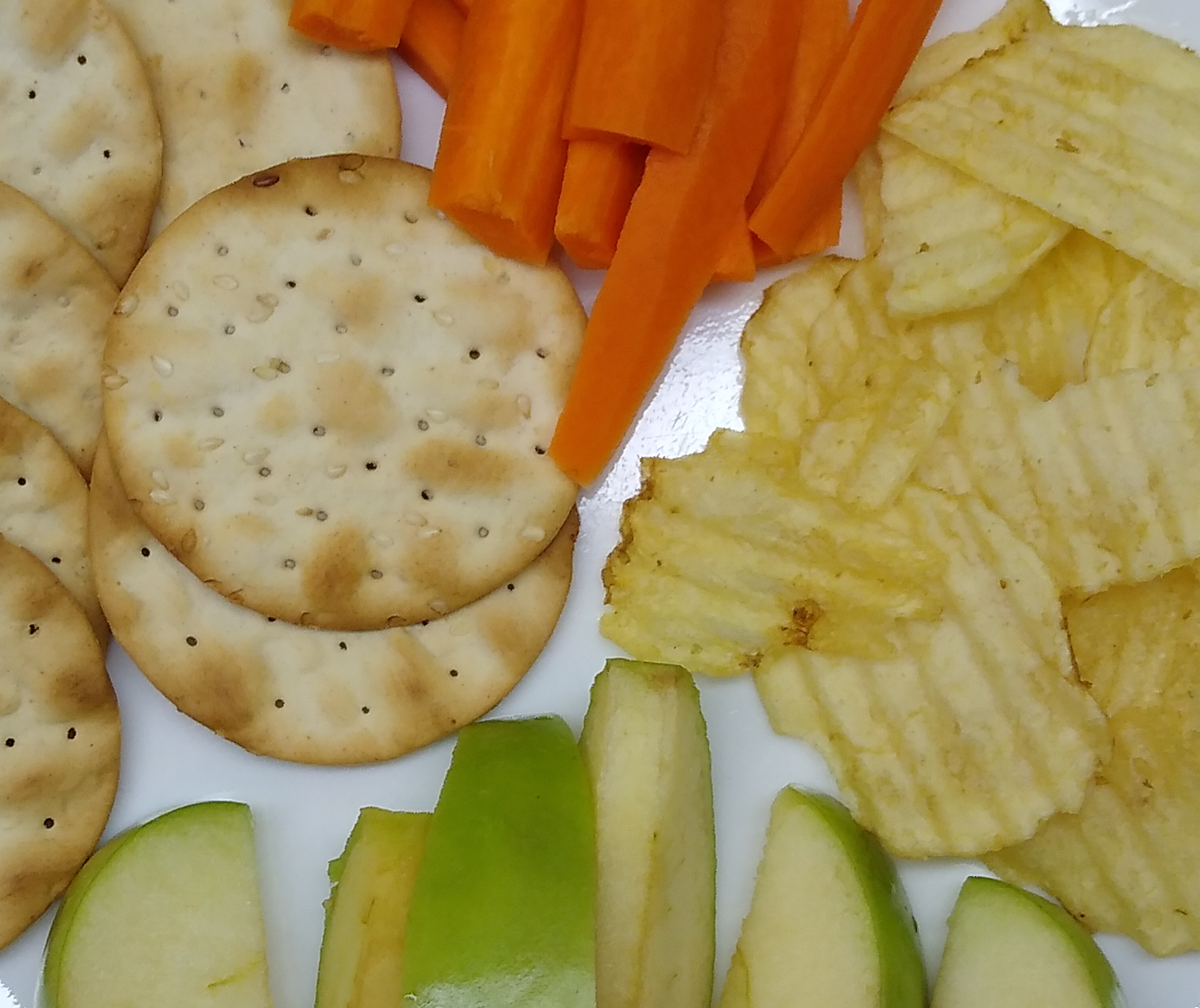
Crunchy foods

Crunchiness is the sensation of muffled grinding of a foodstuff. Crunchiness differs from crispness in that a crisp item is quickly atomized, while a crunchy one offers sustained, granular resistance to jaw action. While crispness is difficult to maintain, crunchiness is difficult to overcome.

Crunchy foods are associated with freshness, particularly in vegetables. In bready foods, crunchiness can instead be associated with staleness. Other foods regularly associated with the sensation include nuts and sweets.

== Relationship to sound ==
Crispness and crunchiness could each be "assessed on the basis of sound alone, on the basis of oral-tactile clues alone, or on the basis of a combination of auditory and oral-tactile information". An acoustic frequency of 1.9 kHz seems to mark the threshold between the two sensations, with crunchiness at frequencies below, and crispness at frequencies above.

== See also ==
- Chewiness
- Mouthfeel
