= Masareal =

Filipino delicacy made from peanuts

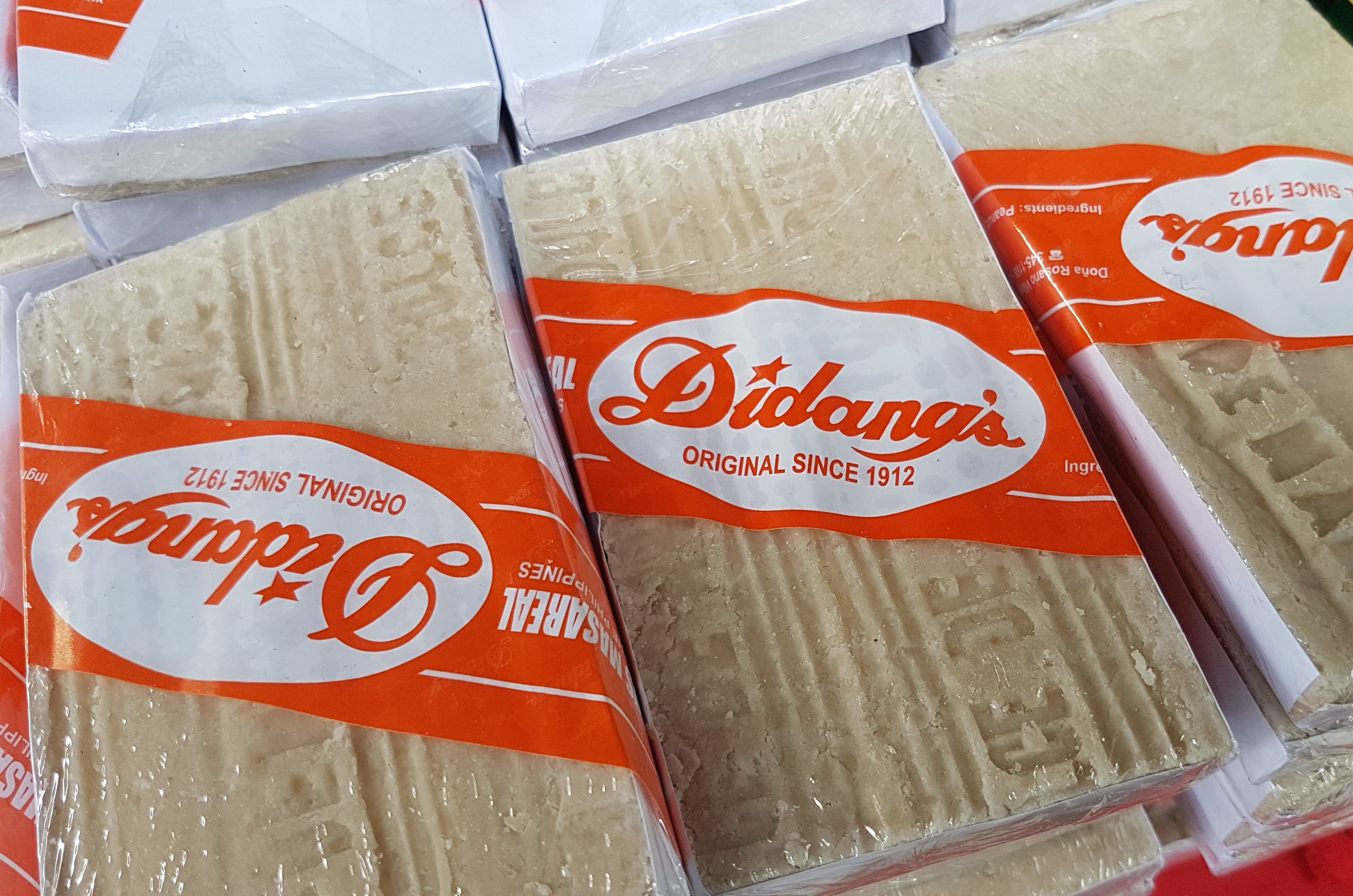
- Alternative names: Mahareal
- Place of origin: Philippines
- Region or state: Mandaue, Cebu
- Main ingredients: boiled peanuts, sugar

Masareal or masa real is a Filipino delicacy made from a mixture of finely-ground boiled peanuts and sugar. It is dried and cut into rectangular bars. It is traditionally sold wrapped in white paper. It originates from Mandaue, Cebu. The known makers of masareal in Mandaue are the Mana Acion's, Didangs and Ponsas brand. The name is Spanish and literally translates to "royal dough".

== See also ==
- Choc Nut
- Caycay
