= Tragacanth =

Natural gum consisting of the dried sap of Astragalus species

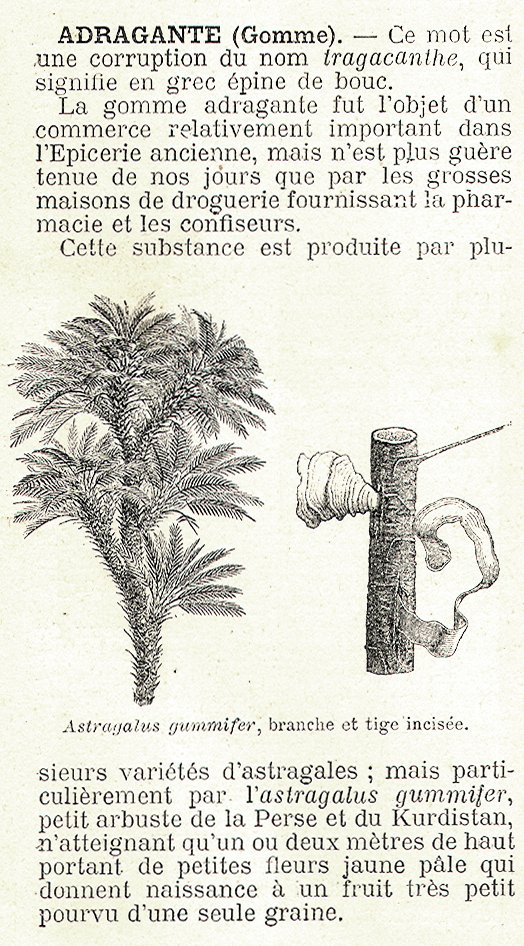
Astragalus gummifer

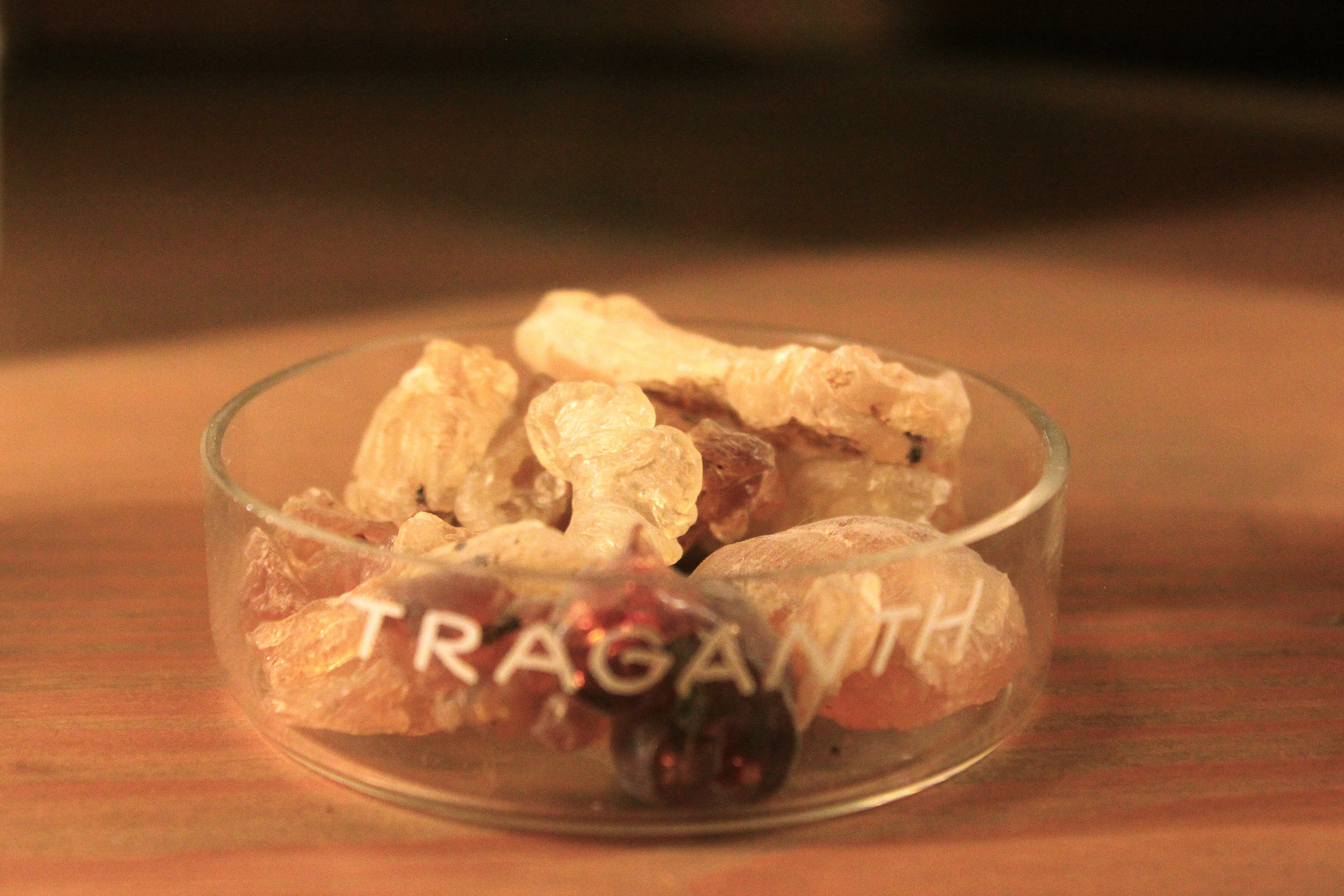
A dish of Tragacanth

Tragacanth is a natural gum obtained from the dried sap of several species of Middle Eastern legumes of the genus Astragalus, including A. adscendens, A. gummifer, A. brachycalyx, and A. tragacantha. Some of these species are known collectively under the common names "goat's thorn" and "locoweed". The gum is sometimes called Shiraz gum, shiraz, gum elect or gum dragon. The name derives from the Greek words tragos (meaning "goat") and akantha ("thorn"). Iran is the biggest producer of this gum.

Gum tragacanth is a viscous, odorless, tasteless, water-soluble mixture of polysaccharides obtained from sap that is drained from the root of the plant and dried. The gum seeps from the plant in twisted ribbons or flakes that can be powdered. It absorbs water to become a gel, which can be stirred into a paste. The major fractions are known as tragacanthin, highly water-soluble as a mucilaginous colloid, and the chemically related bassorin, which is far less soluble but swells in water to form a gel. The gum is used in vegetable-tanned leatherworking as an edge slicking and burnishing compound, and is occasionally used as a stiffener in textiles. The gum has been used historically as a herbal remedy for such conditions as cough and diarrhea. Powders using tragacanth as a basis were sometimes called diatragacanth. As a mucilage or paste, it has been used as a topical treatment for burns. It is used in pharmaceuticals and foods as an emulsifier, thickener, stabilizer, and texturant additive (E number E413). It is the traditional binder used in the making of artists' pastels, as it does not adhere to itself the same way other gums (such as gum arabic) do when dry. Gum tragacanth is also used to make a paste used in floral sugarcraft to create lifelike flowers on wires used as decorations for cakes, which air-dries brittle and can take colorings. It enables users to get a very fine, delicate finish to their work. It has traditionally been used as an adhesive in the cigar-rolling process used to secure the cap or "flag" leaf to the finished cigar body.

In the Middle East, and in Turkey in particular, gum tragacanth is used in paper marbling to make size on which to float and shape the pigments, just as carrageenan is used in the West.

Gum tragacanth is also used in incense-making as a binder to hold all the powdered herbs together. Its water solubility is ideal for ease of working and an even spread, and it is one of the stronger gums for holding particles in suspension. Only half as much is needed, compared to gum arabic or something similar.

== Food use ==
It is common in Indian cuisine as "Goond Kateera" (also spelled as "Gond Katira" - Hindi: गोंद कतीरा, Urdu: گوند کتیرا). "Goond" means "glue" or "tree sap" in Hindi, so that would mean "tree sap of Kateera".

It is sometimes used as an additive to summer beverages for its perceived cooling properties.

A common dish that uses it is the Jammu and Kashmir cuisine's special sundh.

In European patisserie, gum is mixed with fine sugar and colorants to make gum paste, used to make edible decorations, such as imitation flowers and fruits, much like fondant.

Fisherman's Friend menthol lozenges and Pastiglie Leone contain gum tragacanth as an ingredient.
