= Chewiness =

Mouthfeel sensation due to sustained, elastic resistance to chewing

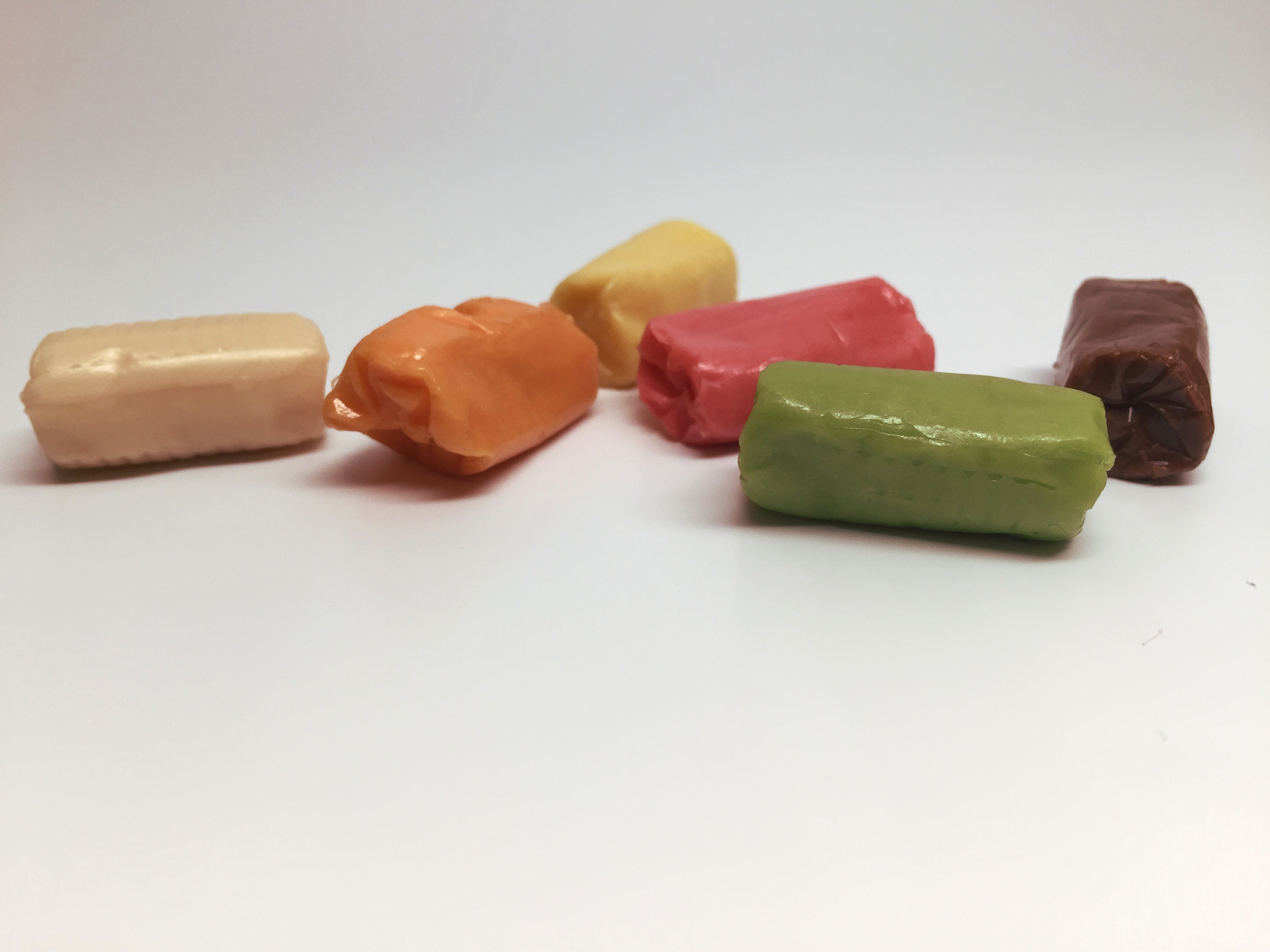
Chewy candy

Chewiness is the mouthfeel sensation of labored chewing due to sustained, elastic resistance from the food. Foods typically considered chewy include caramel, rare steak, and chewing gum. Other foods where this is an important part of the experience of eating include springy cheeses and apples.

Chewiness is empirically measured by the metrics of chew count and chew rate.
