= Ethel M Chocolates =

American company

Coordinates: 36.073°N 115.072°W

- Founded: 1981
- Founder: Forrest Mars Sr.
- Headquarters: Henderson, Nevada
- Number of locations: 10
- Area served: Las Vegas, Nevada; Glendale, California
- Products: Chocolate
- Owner: Mars Inc.
- Website: www.ethelm.com

Ethel M Chocolates is an American chocolate manufacturer and retailer, based in Henderson, Nevada. It was founded by Forrest Mars Sr. in 1981, and is named after his mother, Ethel Mars. The company produces preservative-free chocolates using her recipes. It has been owned by Mars Inc. since 1988.

== History and products ==
Ethel M Chocolates was founded by Forrest Mars Sr., who previously oversaw Mars Inc., known for its candy products. Mars retired from the eponymous company in 1973, but soon grew bored. In 1979, he was planning a new candy venture named after his mother, Ethel Gale Mars (née Kissack). (Note: Not to be confused with his father's second wife, Ethel V. Mars (nee Healy).) Mars and his mother had moved to the Las Vegas Valley in 1975, and she lived there until her death in April 1980, at the age of 97.

The company's factory began operations in March 1981, in Henderson, Nevada, part of the Las Vegas Valley. Retail stores were established throughout the area, and eventually in other states. The chocolates are made without preservatives, using recipes created by Ethel Mars. Because the chocolates lack preservatives, they have a short shelf-life. As such, the tourist-driven Las Vegas Valley was deemed ideal for quick product sales. Henderson was also chosen because of its lack of pollution, as chocolate is susceptible to odors.

Ethel M quickly became popular for its liqueur-filled chocolates, which accounted for 5 of the 24 varieties offered at the time. The liqueur candies were sold only in Nevada, one of two states allowing large quantities of liquor in candy, the other being Kentucky. This was another factor for establishing the business in Nevada.

Within a few years, retail stores were opened in northern California. Ethel M soon had annual sales of $150 million, generated through 70 stores throughout the western United States. Ethel M was purchased by Mars Inc. in 1988, and Mars himself soon moved to Miami. By 1991, Ethel M had 50 stores across Arizona, California, and Nevada. Further states were excluded, due to the negative effects that long shipping times had on the chocolates. Ethel M had 500 workers as of 2003, and was among the largest manufacturing employers in Henderson. It had 15 retail outlets at that time, 13 of them in Nevada.

In 2005, Mars Inc. debuted a series of chocolate lounges in the Chicago area under the name Ethel's Chocolate Lounge. The concept capitalized on a growing trend of chocolate lounges around the U.S. This was accompanied by the launch of Ethel's Chocolates, a high-end line distinct from the more affordable Ethel M brand. These chocolates, also made in Henderson, were sold online and at Ethel's Chocolate Lounges. The first Nevada-based lounge was opened in 2006, at the Fashion Show Mall on the Las Vegas Strip. The Chicago lounges underperformed during the Great Recession, and were closed in 2009.

In 2017, Ethel M revived two chocolate bar varieties: Mars, which had been discontinued in 2002; and Forever Yours, discontinued in 1979.

Ethel M partnered with the Vegas Golden Knights hockey team in 2017, a deal which included featuring its chocolate at games. Ethel M, in celebration of its 40th anniversary, also sponsored NASCAR driver Kyle Busch and his No. 18 Toyota Camry race car in the 2021 Pennzoil 400 race in Las Vegas, and would do so again for the 2022 event.

As of 2024, Ethel M has nine retail locations throughout the Las Vegas Valley, and one at the Glendale Galleria in Glendale, California. The chocolates are also sold at select businesses around the U.S. and through the company's website.

== Factory and cactus garden ==
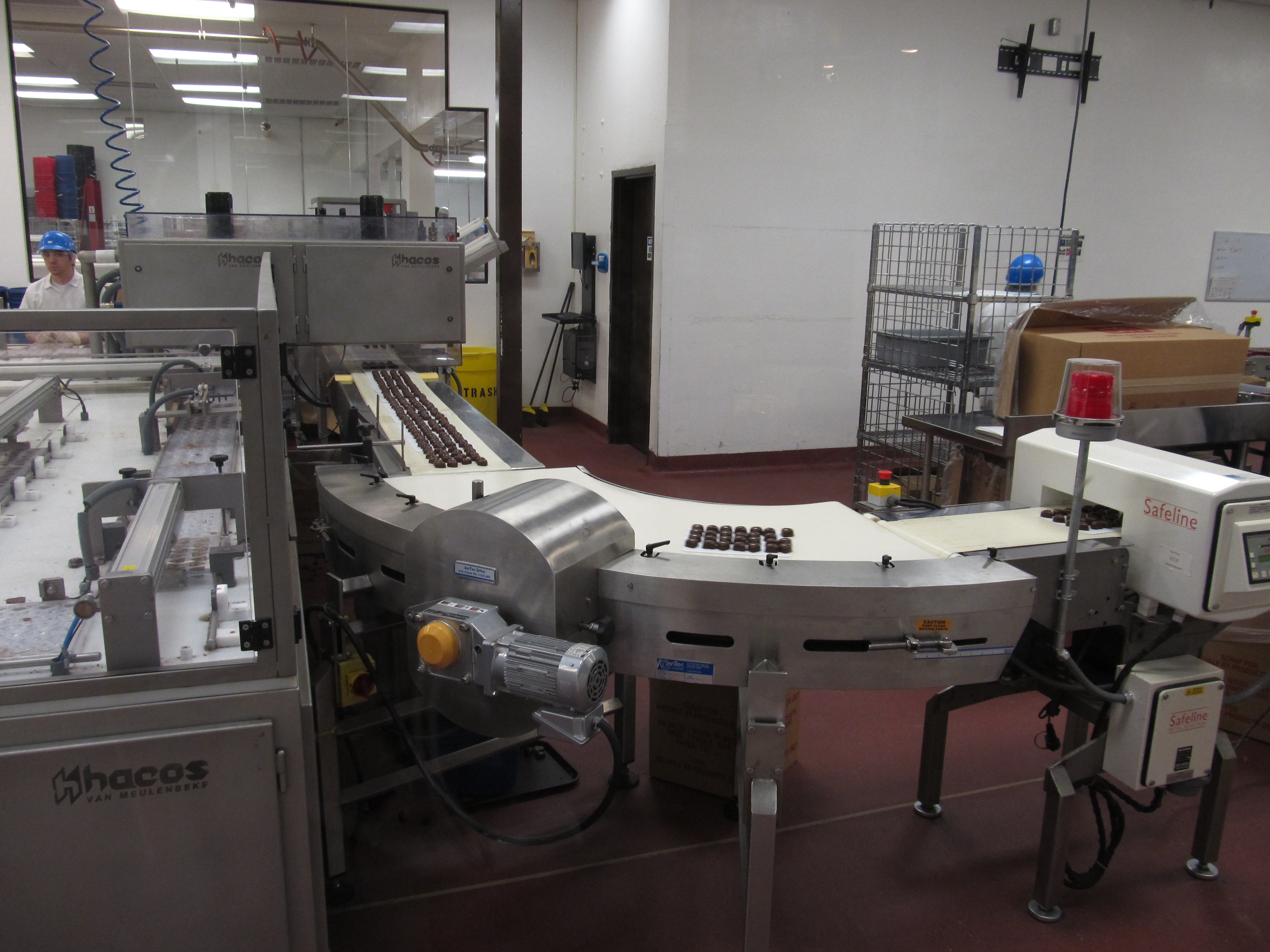
A portion of the Ethel M Chocolates factory interior

The Ethel M Chocolates Factory is located at 2 Cactus Garden Drive in Henderson, and is a popular attraction. A portion of the factory interior is open to the public for free self-guided tours, with windows providing a view of the chocolate-making process. The facility also includes a retail store for the company's products, and a chocolate and wine-tasting room. As of 2011, the factory received 700,000 visitors a year.

As of 2016, the factory produces approximately 8 million pieces of chocolate annually. Various fillings are also produced on-site, including peanut butter, caramel, and various fruit-based creams. It is the sole production facility for Ethel M products. From 1996 to 2003, the factory also produced seasonal candies for other brands owned by Mars Inc., including Dove, Milky Way, and Snickers. In addition, it has served as a test kitchen for new Mars candies. Mars himself had an apartment above the factory, where he lived during the 1980s while overseeing the company. The apartment was later converted into office and work space.

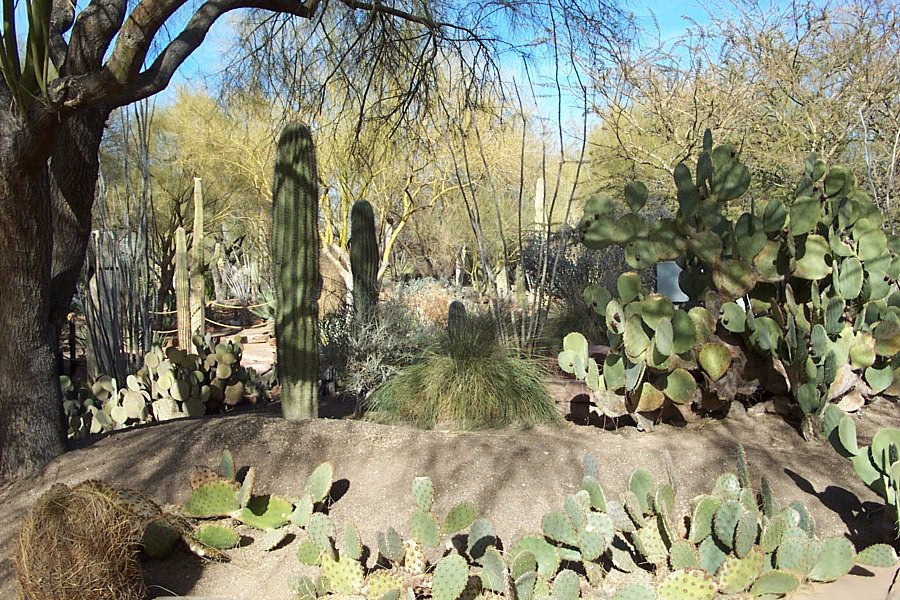
Ethel M's Botanical Cactus Garden

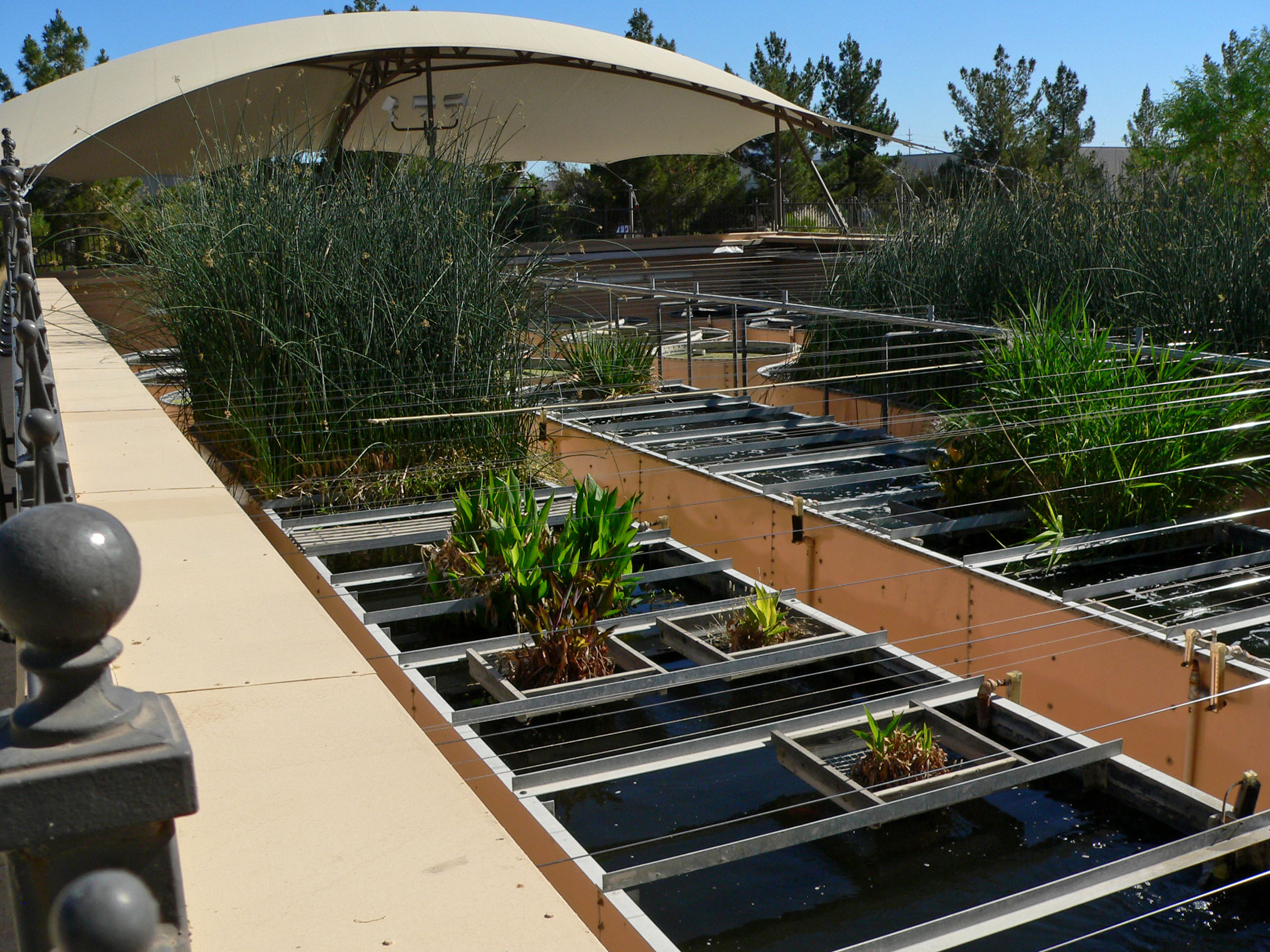
Water treatment facility

Adjacent to the factory is Ethel M's 3-acre (1.2 ha) Botanical Cactus Garden, also open for free self-guided tours. It includes more than 300 cactus and desert plant species. The garden opened in September 1981, and averaged 300 to 400 visitors per day during its early years. Since 1994, the cactus garden has been decorated at the end of each year with holiday lights to celebrate Christmas. Early on, the display included approximately 50,000 lights. This later grew to 500,000, with the display taking two months to complete. Since 2015, the cactus garden has also been lit up for Valentine's Day with the "Lights of Love" display.

In the mid-1990s, Ethel M added an on-site water treatment facility for the factory's dirty dishwater, which is re-used for landscaping. The treatment facility was incorporated into the cactus tour. In 2011, a 4.4-acre (1.8 ha) solar panel garden was built to help power the chocolate factory. As of 2016, the factory and cactus garden receive approximately 1 million visitors each year.

== See also ==
- See's Candies
