= Curly Wurly =

Brand of chocolate bar

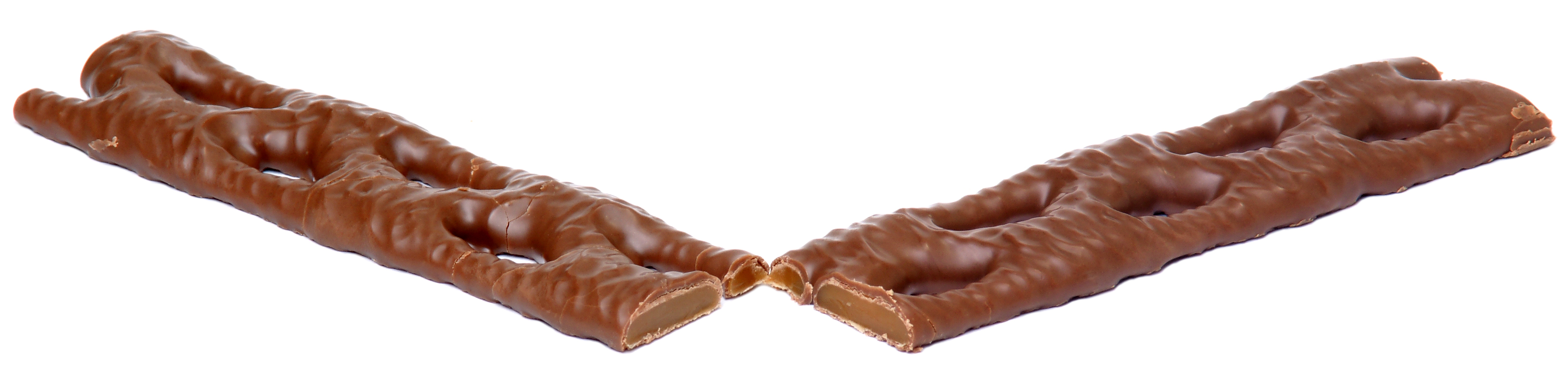
- Product type: Confectionery
- Current owner: Cadbury
- Country: United Kingdom
- Introduced: 1970; 56 years ago
- Website: Cadbury.co.uk

Curly Wurly is a brand of chocolate bar manufactured by British company Cadbury and sold worldwide since 1970. Its shape resembles three flattened, intertwined serpentine strings. The bar is made of chocolate-coated hard caramel.

== History ==
This design was created by David John Parfitt, a long-serving research confectioner based at the Cadbury Bournville factory, while he was experimenting with some surplus toffee from another piece of work. It was launched in 1970.

Since 2010, Curly Wurly has been produced in Poland at the Skarbimiersz factory. Previously it was produced in England until the Somerdale Factory closed.

== Rival products ==
Similar products were launched by several rival confectionery companies. These were either to compete with Cadbury, or else to act as a spoiler for a Cadbury launch.

=== Mars ===
In western Europe, Mars introduced a similar bar in March 1972 with the name "3 Musketeers". The packaging had drawings of the titular Three Musketeers on it. In 1976 this was changed to look more like the American "Marathon" bar (see below). The German versions were called "3 Musketiere", the Dutch version was called "3 Musketeers" and the French version "3 Mousquetaires". Mars' 3 Musketiers bar in Europe is not to be confused with their 3 Musketeers bar in the U.S. which is a completely different product that does not contain caramel (and is the equivalent to Milky Way in Europe).

In the United States, Mars marketed their version as "Marathon" first sold in August 1973. Cadbury had launched the Curly Wurly in the U.S. only weeks earlier. The Mars version had bright red packaging with a ruler printed on the reverse with 8 inches (20 cm) markings demonstrating that it was as long as it claimed. It was discontinued in October 1981. The American "Marathon" is also not to be confused with the Marathon bar sold by Mars at the time in the British and Irish markets which was an entirely different snack and a rebranding of Snickers.

=== August Storck ===
In West Germany and Austria, August Storck marketed such a bar beginning in about 1972 under the name "Leckerschmecker".

=== Mackintosh ===
A Canadian product made by Mackintosh's, in English known as the "Wig Wag", was available in the 1970s.

=== Marabou ===
A Swedish version was called "Loop", released in 2011 under the Swedish brand Marabou (owned by Kraft).

== See also ==
- List of chocolate bar brands
