= Forrest Mars Sr. =

American businessman (1904–1999)

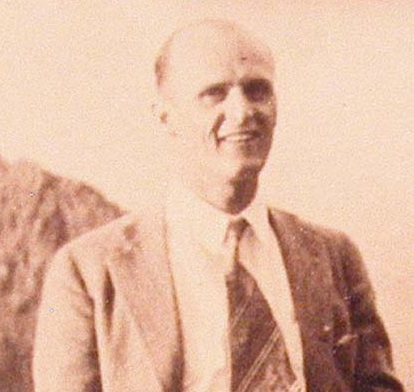
- Born: Forrest Edward Mars; March 21, 1904; Wadena, Minnesota, U.S.
- Died: July 1, 1999 (aged 95); Miami, Florida, U.S.
- Education: Yale University; University of California, Berkeley
- Occupation: Confectionary magnate
- Years active: 1929−1980
- Known for: Director of Mars Inc.; Founder of Ethel M Chocolate Factory Founder of Pedigree Petfoods
- Spouse: Audrey Ruth Meyer (m. 1930; died 1989)
- Family: Mars family

Forrest Edward Mars Sr. (March 21, 1904 – July 1, 1999) was an American billionaire businessman and the driving force of the candy company Mars Inc. until 1973.

Born in Minnesota, his father Frank Mars established the Mars company during Forrest's childhood. As a young man, Forrest Mars started working at the company in 1929, the same year when it moved over to Chicago. Wanting to expand abroad and becoming estranged from his father, Forrest moved to Europe, where he founded his own Mars company in the English town of Slough. There, he created the Mars chocolate bar (1932) and Maltesers (1936), making Mars a major candy company in Britain. Mars also expanded into petfoods, founding Pedigree Petfoods.

After the start of World War II, Mars resided in the United States, where he created a joint venture that led to the creation of M&M's chocolate in 1941, and in another venture with a Texan businessman created Uncle Ben's Rice. Mars won control of his late father's company in Chicago in 1964, merging his own British-based Mars company into it. He handed over the Mars company to his children in 1973 and later still founded Ethel M Chocolates.

== Early life ==
Mars was born March 21, 1904, in Wadena, Minnesota, the only child of Franklin Clarence Mars, the founder of the Mars Candy Company, and his first wife Ethel Gale Mars (née Kissack; 1882–1980). He was raised by his maternal grandparents in North Battleford, Saskatchewan, Canada, after his parents' divorce when he was just a child. He rarely saw his father, who remarried to Ethel V. Mars in 1910. He had a half sister, Patricia Mars.

After high school, he entered the University of California, Berkeley, and later transferred to Yale University, where he completed a degree in industrial engineering in 1928.

== Career ==
As an adult, Forrest Mars reunited with his father at Mars, Inc. However, the pair ran into a disagreement when Forrest wanted to expand abroad while his father did not. For a few years he worked at the new plant in Chicago and supervised the development of the Snickers and 3 Musketeers bars. Forrest would claim that it was he who proposed the new product that would become the iconic Milky Way bar after drinking a malted milkshake. Frances Herdlinger, a newly hired chemist at the Chicago lab of Mars Inc, remembered "Forrest Mars would turn up often with something new for us to try." After a quarrel with his father, Mars was removed from the company. He took a $50,000 buyout from his father, including foreign rights to Milky Way, and moved to England where he created the Mars bar and Maltesers while estranged from his father in 1933. He started in a small kitchen, where he launched a product called Mars bar, a chocolate confection similar to Milky Way. In Europe, Mars briefly worked for Nestlé and the Tobler company.

In 1934, he bought a British company, Chappel Bros, specialized in canned meat for dogs. Due to the lack of competition, Forrest took control of this market as he launched and marketed Chappie's canned food.

After he returned to the United States, Mars started his own food business, Food Products Manufacturing, where he established the Uncle Ben's Rice line and a pet food business, Pedigree. In partnership later with Bruce Murrie, Mars developed M&M's, the chocolate candy covered in a crunchy shell which "melts in your mouth, not in your hands," in 1940. They were possibly modeled after Smarties. Peanut M&M's were introduced in 1954, which Forrest Mars Sr. helped to develop, despite the fact he was allergic to peanuts. Murrie later left the business.

Following the death of his father, Forrest Mars took over the family business, Mars, Inc, merging it with his own company in 1964. In 1930, he married Audrey Ruth Meyer (b. May 25, 1910, in Chicago, d. June 15, 1989, in Washington, D.C.), and they had three children – Forrest Jr., John, and Jacqueline.

Mars retired from Mars, Inc., in 1973, turning the company over to his children.

== After retirement ==
In 1980, retired and living in Henderson, Nevada, he founded Ethel M Chocolates, named after his mother. Ethel M was purchased by Mars, Inc. in 1988. Despite retiring, Mars continued to often phone and complain against his children about his perceived concerns about how the Mars company was being run, at old age into the 1990s. Mars was inducted into the Forbes magazine's U.S. Business Hall of Fame in 1984.

Mars died at age 95 on July 1, 1999, in Miami, Florida, having amassed a fortune of $4 billion. Forbes magazine ranked him as the 30th richest American (Forrest Jr. and John were 29th and 31st, respectively) and as the 103rd wealthiest person in the world. He left the business jointly to his three children.

== Legacy ==
Mars had a "disagreeable" personality, but was highly intelligent in business practices. He kept his Mars businesses strictly private, which included a ban on talking to the press and not publishing financial accounts. Despite being one of the richest Americans in the world, Mars led a frugal lifestyle and raised his children that way. He avoided publicity and photographs, and only approved of one interview in his life that took place in 1966 with the Candy Industry and Confectioners Journal.

== See also ==
- List of billionaires
