= Mars bar =

Chocolate bar produced by Mars Inc.

Mars
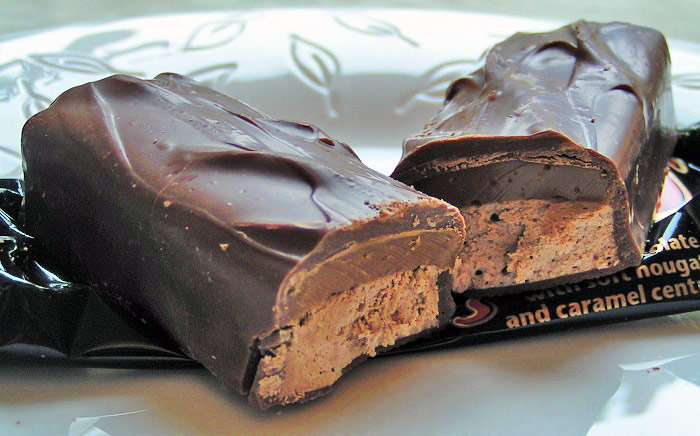
- A halved Mars chocolate bar; its internal layers are visible
- Place of origin: England
- Created by: Forrest Mars
- Invented: August 1, 1932; 94 years ago
- Main ingredients: Chocolate, caramel, nougat
- Food energy (per 50 g or 1.8 oz serving): 230 kcal (960 kJ)
Nutritional value
(per 50 g or 1.8 oz serving)
- Protein: 2.2 g
- Fat: 8.5 g
- Carbohydrate: 35.3 g

Mars, commonly known as a Mars bar, is a chocolate bar produced by Mars Inc., consisting of caramel and nougat coated with milk chocolate. It was first manufactured in 1932 in England by Forrest Mars Sr., modelled after his father's original Milky Way bar.

A chocolate bar called Mars Bar was produced in the United States with nougat and toasted almonds covered in milk chocolate, and later also with caramel, sold in cream-coloured packaging. This was discontinued in 2002, then revived in a slightly different form the following year under the name "Snickers Almond".

== History ==
The Mars bar was first manufactured in Slough, England, in 1932 by Forrest Mars Sr., son of American candy maker Frank C. Mars. He modelled the Mars bar after his father's Milky Way bar, which was already popular in the US, adjusting the recipe to better suit European tastes. He had a staff of twelve people, and originally advertised it as using Cadbury's chocolate couverture. As a result, the "British" Mars bar (also labelled the "European", "Global" or "Original" Mars bar) is considered to be a version of the American Milky Way bar, with only a slightly sweeter taste.

The pre-2002 Mars logo, which is still used in some countries

The bar and the proportions of the main components have changed over the years. With minor variations, this version is sold worldwide, except for the US, and is packaged in a black wrapper with red gold-edged lettering. Three million Mars bars accompanied the British task force to the Falklands in 1982. The Mars bar was introduced in Belgium in 1970.

The Mars brand logo went through several changes. In 1932, the first logo had a black colour font and was tilted. In 1978, the logo was rebranded to being white and having a star on the side. In 1988, the Mars bar had gone through a significant change with its logo. At that time, the logo was given a more bombastic treatment, written with red thick font and golden outlier. This logo became the standard-form for future logos. The logo then changed again, in the early 2000s. This time the logo was given a much more modern and sleeker look. It was updated to have a more cursive appearance to it and has retained that appearance ever since.

In 2002, the Mars bar was rebranded across Europe with localised taglines. In addition the nougat was made lighter, the chocolate on top became thinner, and the overall weight of the bar was reduced slightly. The slogan "Pleasure you can't measure" used in Britain was intended to appeal more to women and youths. In Germany on the other hand the tagline was "It is Mars – that's it" while in France it was "Mars – What happiness".

== Sizes ==
Various sizes are made. As of 2008: miniature bars called "Fun Size" (19.7 g, 0.69 oz) and "Snack Time" (36.5 g, 1.29 oz) (both sold in multiple packs); a larger multi-pack size of 54 g (1.9 oz); the regular-sized single 51 g (1.8 oz) bar, and a "king-size" 84 g (3.0 oz) bar, since replaced by "Mars Duo" (85 g or 3.0 oz), a pack of two bars. The regular 58 g (2.0 oz) single bar contains 260 calories.

In the second half of 2008, Mars UK reduced the weight of regular bars from 62.5 g (2.20 oz) to 58 g (2.0 oz). Although the reduction in size was not publicised at the time, Mars claimed the change was designed to help tackle the obesity crisis in the UK, but later acknowledged that the real reason for the change was rising costs. In 2013, the "standard" Mars bar was further reduced to 51 g (1.8 oz), for a reduction of about 20% in 5 years; it continued to be 51 g (1.8 oz) in 2023.

In May 2009, the Mars bar size reduced from 60 g (2.1 oz) to 53 g (1.9 oz) in Australia, citing portion sizes and the obesity debate as the primary driver. By 2022 it was noted the Mars bar size had been reduced further to 47 g (1.7 oz) in Australia and New Zealand.

== Mars almond bar ==
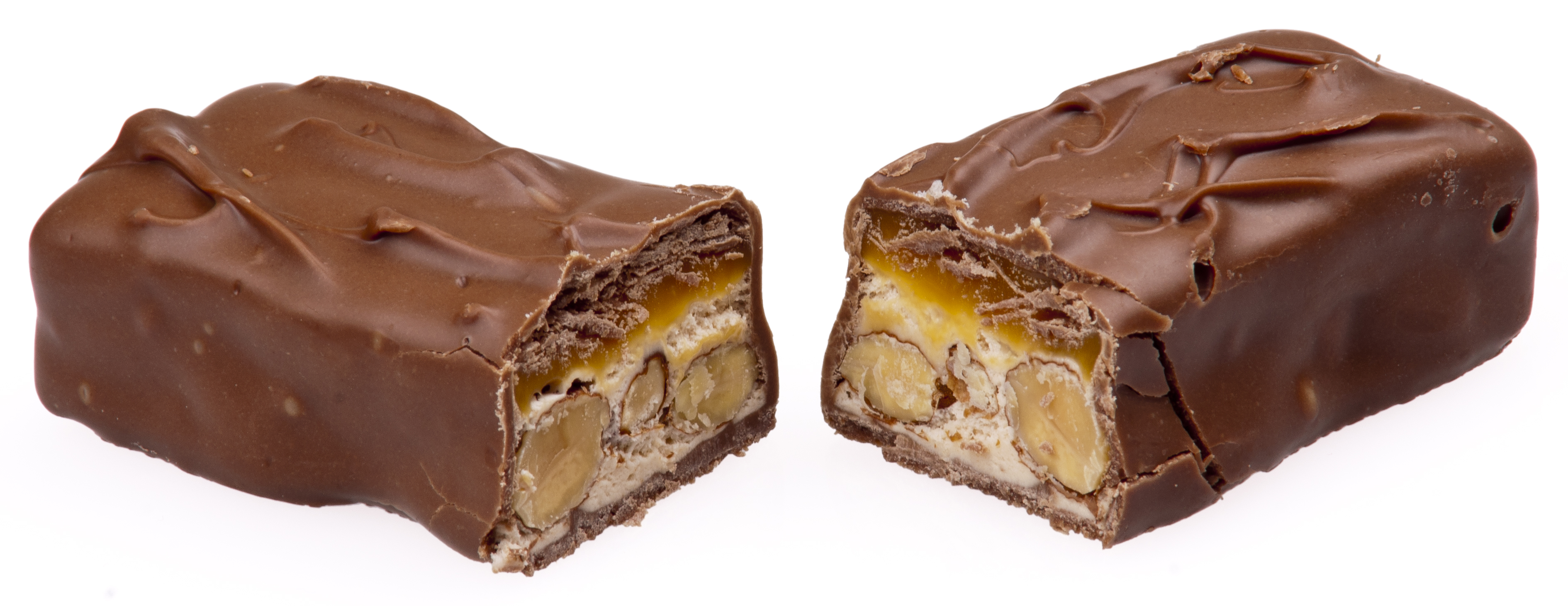
A Mars Almond split

In the United States, the Mars bar was a candy bar with nougat and toasted almonds, coated with milk chocolate. The same candy bar is known outside the United States as a Mars Almond bar (and was also marketed for some time in Canada alongside their standard Mars). The bar was first introduced in America in 1936. Originally the American Mars bar did not have caramel, but at some point caramel was added. It was discontinued in 2002.

In 2003, the company introduced a replacement called Snickers Almond containing nougat, almonds, caramel, and a milk chocolate coating. It is similar to the Mars bar, with some differences; for example, the pieces of almond are smaller in Snickers Almond than in the Mars bar.

The Mars bar was briefly relaunched in January 2010 (initially exclusively through Walmart stores), discontinued again at the end of 2011, and relaunched again in September 2016 by Ethel M, the gourmet chocolate subsidiary of Mars, Inc. The 2016 version was the "original American recipe", without caramel.

== Spinoff products ==
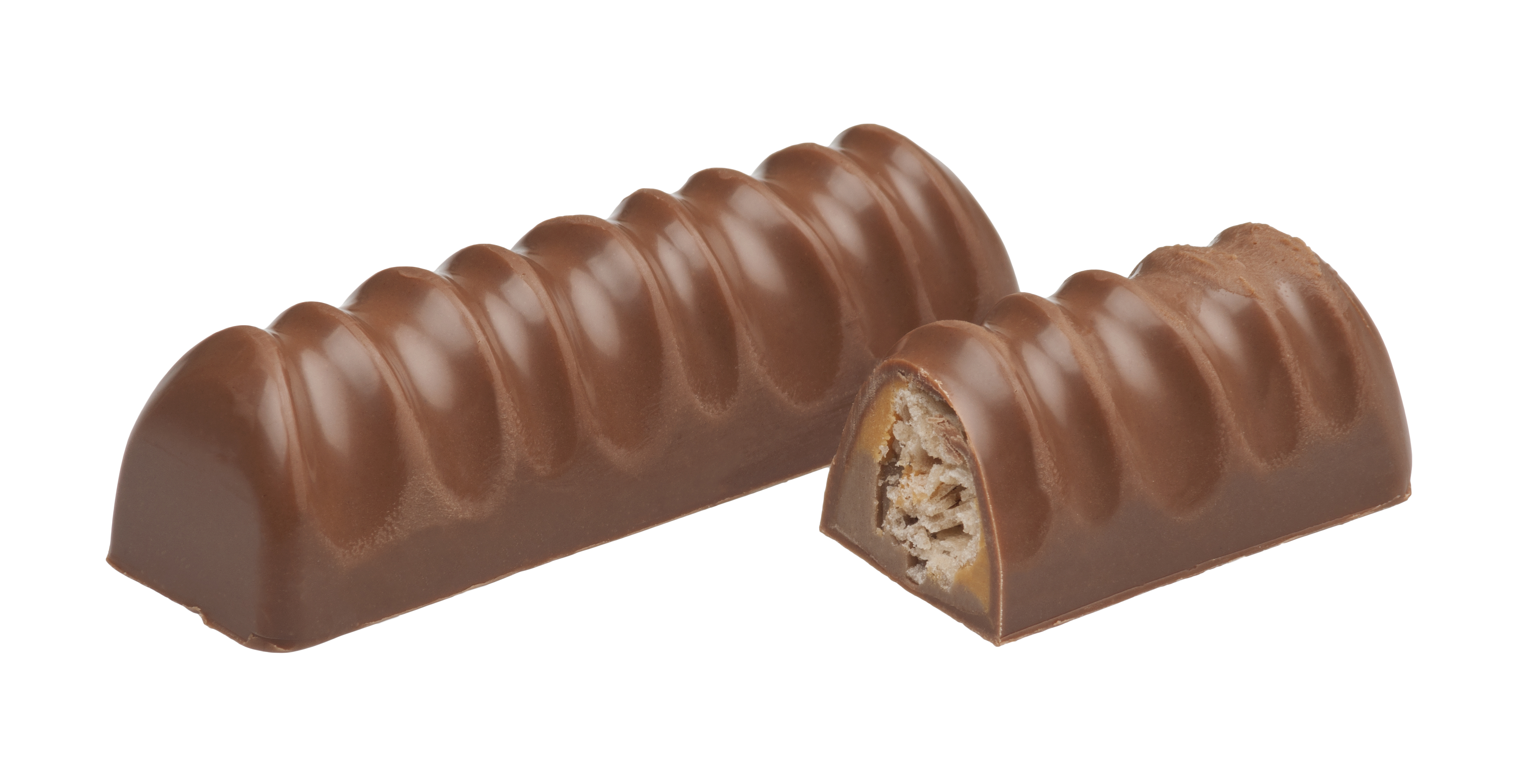
Mars Delight bars, whole and split

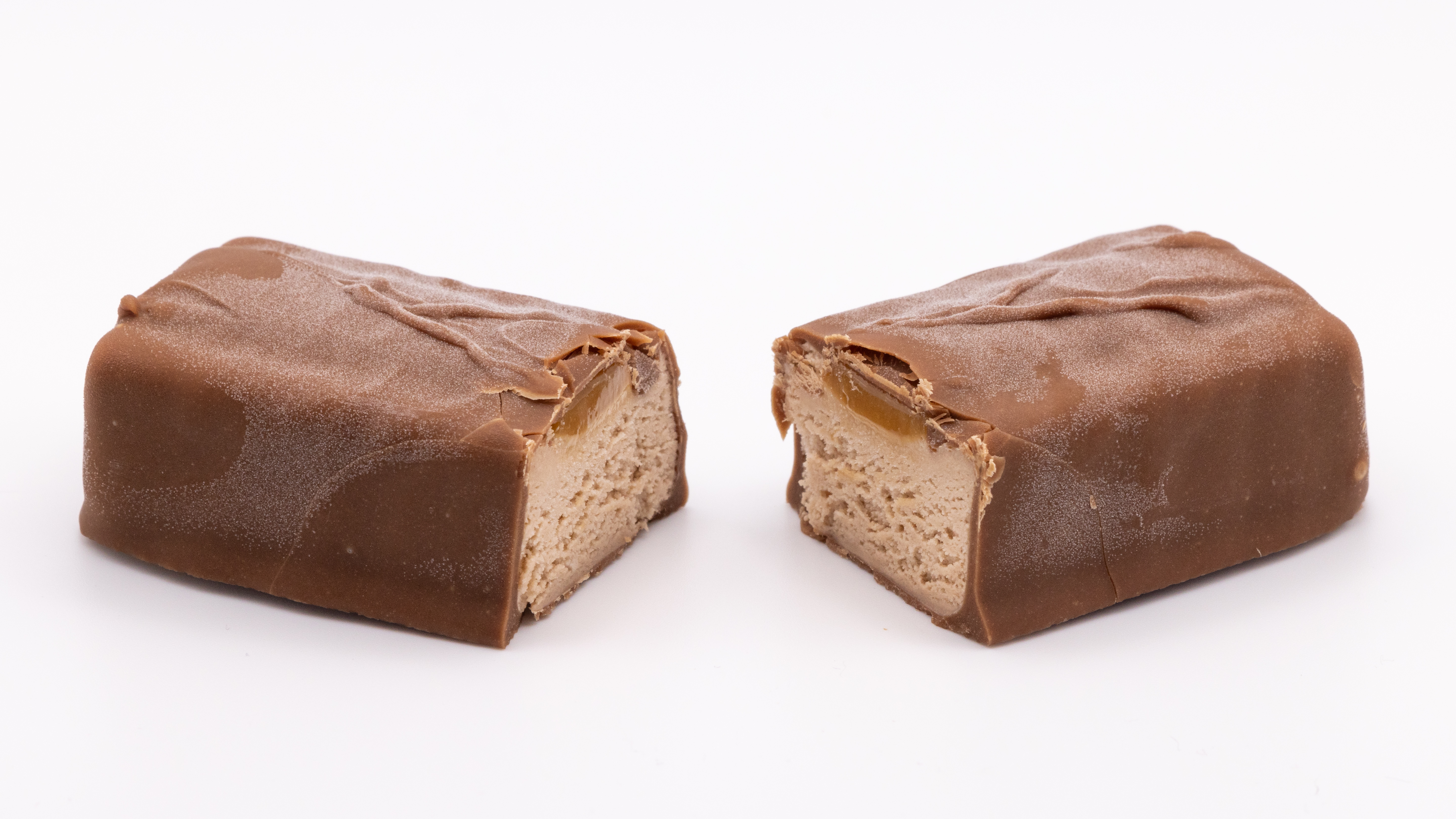
Mars Ice Cream bar split

Other products have also been released using the Mars name.

- Mars Bites/Bouchées (Canada)
- Mars Milk (1998)
- Mars Delight (discontinued in the UK in 2008)
- Mars Choc Brownie
- Mars Extra Chocolate Drink
- No Added Sugar Drink
- Mars Ice Cream bars
- Mars and Mars Midnight Ice Cream bars
- McVities Mars Mini Rolls
- Mars Biscuits (Australia and the UK – a biscuit with Mars topping)
- Mars Pods (Australia and New Zealand – a small crunchy wafer shell with Mars filling, also available in variants)
- Mars Rocks
- Mars Planets
- Mars Mix
- Mars Frozen Dessert Bar
- Mars Protein – A 50 g Mars bar with less sugar and more protein; packaging states "More protein, 40% less sugar".

== Packaging variants ==
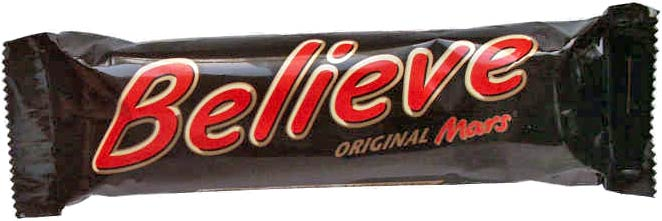
Mars Believe

The original Mars bar was sold throughout Britain from April 2006 until the end of the 2006 FIFA World Cup in a "Believe" packaging ("Original Mars" appeared in smaller print), to indicate support for the England national football team in the competition. A generic advertising campaign was used in the other UK nations which did not qualify for the competition, but the usage of the "Believe" packaging in Scotland caused negative publicity.

Similarly, Mars were re-branded "Hopp" ("Go!" in English) in Switzerland during UEFA Euro 2008, again with "Original Mars" shown in smaller print.

On 30 July 2008, the government of Tasmania announced that it had secured a major sponsor, Mars for a bid to enter the Australian Football League in a deal worth $4 million over 3 years and will temporarily change the name of its top-selling chocolate bar in Australia to Believe, to help promote Tasmania's cause.

In 2010, to promote England's involvement in the 2010 FIFA World Cup, the background of Mars packaging sold in the country temporarily became the St. George cross.

== Advertising slogans ==
=== Former ===
- "Maxis from Mars" – United Kingdom (1969) A number of white Austin Maxis were driven around the country with numbers on the doors. If the number inside a Mars Bar wrapper matched that on the car, the purchaser of the Mars Bar won the car.
- "Mars bringt verbrauchte Energie sofort zurück." (Mars replenishes lost energy instantaneously) – Germany (1960s)
- "Mars macht mobil bei Arbeit, Sport und Spiel" (Mars mobilises you at work, sports and play) – Germany (1980s and 1990s)
- "A Mars a day helps you work, rest and play" – Australia, Canada, New Zealand, United Kingdom
- "Out of this world!" – Australia, UK
- "Earth – what you'd eat if you lived on Mars" – New Zealand
- "Another way to make your day" – UK (2005)
- "Feels good to be back! " – Australia (2005)
- "An almond in every bite!" – US
- "Un Mars, et ça repart" (A Mars, and here we go again) – France (late 1990s and renewed from 2006)
- "Mars, que du bonheur" (Mars, only happiness) – France
- "Mars, haal eruit wat erin zit!" (Mars, get the most out of it!) – Netherlands, Belgium
- "Who knows? In 1,000 years we could all be sitting on Mars eating Earth bars." – United Kingdom (a full-page advertisement placed in the official Guide Book for the Millennium Dome in 2000)

=== Current ===
- "Mars your day" – Australia
- "A Mars a day helps you work, rest and play" – UK, Australia
- "Recharge on Mars" – Canada
- "Mars, pleasure you just can't measure" – Europe
- "Un coup de barre? Mars et ça repart!" (Feeling tired? A Mars and here we go again!) – France
- "Nimm Mars, gib Gas" (Take Mars, step on the gas) – Germany
- "Mars, momento di vero godimento" (Mars, a moment of pure enjoyment) – Italy
- "Mars, geeft je energie" (Gives you energy) – The Netherlands and Flanders, Belgium
- "Work-Rest-Play" – UK (later "Work-Rest-Play your part")
- "Turn Up the Heat!" – (UK promotional packs in 2010)

== Deep-fried Mars bar ==
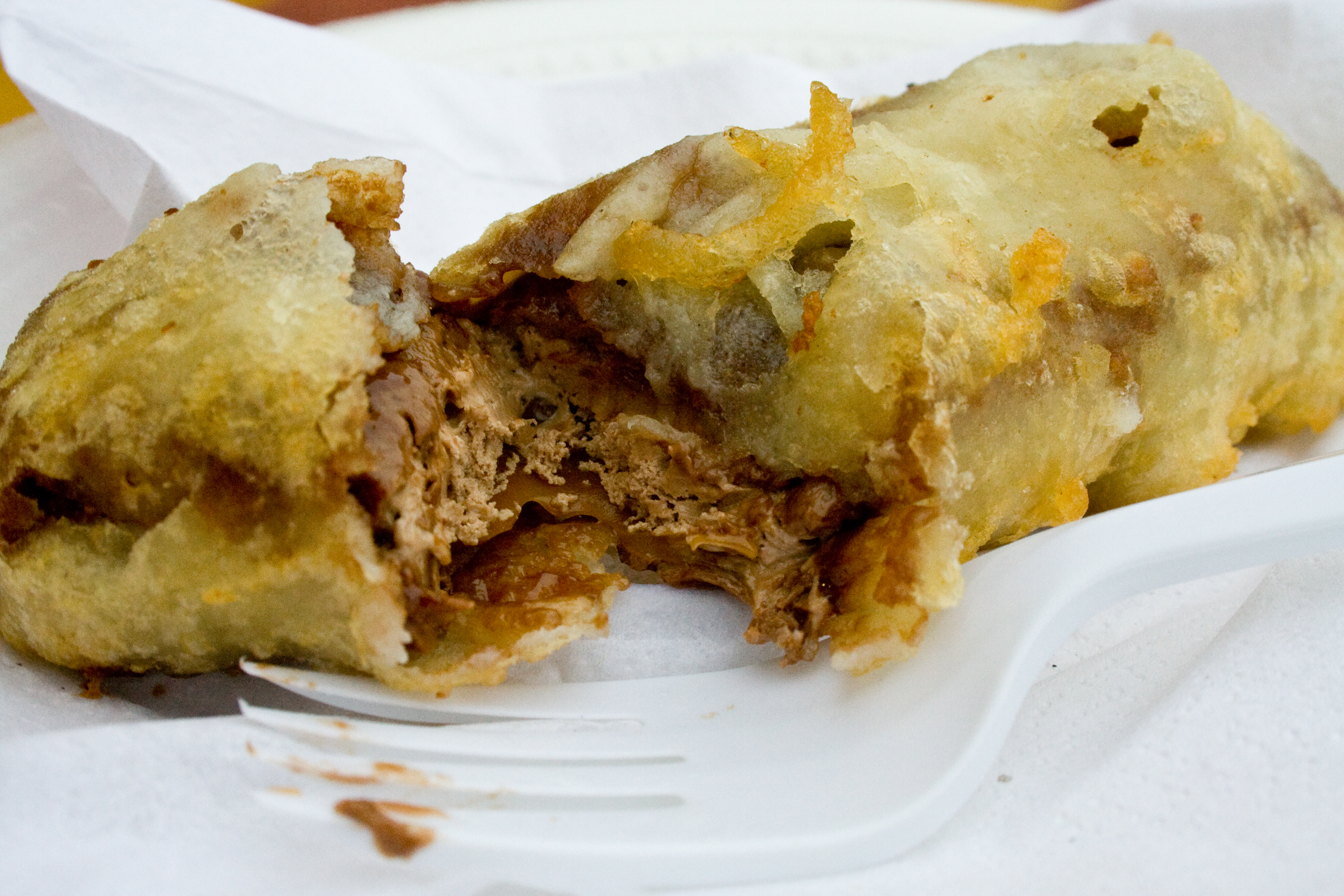
Deep-fried Mars bar

First reports of Mars bars coated with batter and deep-fried being sold in Stonehaven, Scotland date back to 1995. Mars says that it is "not authorised or endorsed". The deep-fried Mars bar has been highly popular in Scotland and it has also been made and sold by individuals in other countries.

In Kathmandu, Nepal, momo dumplings in tourist areas have used Mars bars as an unusual filling.

== Recalls ==
In July 2005, Mars bars, along with the Snickers bar, were recalled due to an anonymous extortion attempt against Star City Casino in Sydney. The extortionist claimed to have poisoned seven Mars and Snickers bars at random stores in New South Wales. As a result, Masterfoods Corporation, the company that manufactures Mars bars in Australia, recalled the entire Mars and Snickers product from store shelves in New South Wales. In the later half of August 2005, the threat to the public was deemed negligible and the bars returned to shelves.

In February 2016, Mars, Snickers and various other Mars, Inc. chocolate products were recalled in 55 countries in Europe, the Middle East and Asia. The precautionary recall was issued after a customer found pieces of plastic in a Snickers bar purchased in Germany. The error was traced back to a Mars, Inc. factory in Veghel, The Netherlands.

== Animal products controversy ==
In May 2007, Mars UK announced that Mars bars, along with many of their other products such as Snickers, Maltesers, Minstrels and Twix would no longer be suitable for vegetarians because of the introduction of rennet, a chemical sourced from calves' stomachs used in the production of whey. Rabbinical authorities declared that the products remained kosher for Jewish consumption.

The decision was condemned by several groups, with the Vegetarian Society stating that "at a time when more and more consumers are concerned about the provenance of their food, Mars' decision to use non-vegetarian whey is a backward step".

Mars later abandoned these plans, stating that it became "very clear, very quickly" that it had made a mistake.

== Economics ==
It has been observed on several occasions that the price of a Mars bar correlates fairly accurately with the change in value of the pound sterling since World War II, much in the way that the Big Mac Index has proven to be a good indicator of the actual relative purchasing power of world currencies.

== Popular culture ==
Northern Irish pop-punk band The Undertones wrote and recorded a song called "Mars Bars", released as a B-side in 1979.

1960s Liverpool band Gerry and the Pacemakers were originally known as Gerry Marsden and the Mars Bars before changing their name due to the objection of the Mars company.
