= Kevin Toolis =

Scottish journalist and filmmaker

- Born: Edinburgh, Scotland
- Occupation: Journalist
- Known for: Filmmaker
- Spouse: Dea Birkett
- Children: 3

Kevin Toolis is a journalist and filmmaker.

== Early life ==
Toolis was born and raised in Edinburgh to parents who were from Achill, County Mayo, Ireland. He brought up his daughter Storme Toolis in London.

== Career ==
Toolis is a filmmaker and journalist who had written for The Guardian, The New York Times, and the Daily Mirror. He won a BAFTA for his torture drama Complicit. Toolis has written screenplays and founded the independent television company ManyRiversFilms.

== Bibliography ==
- Rebel Hearts – Journeys Within The IRA's Soul - ISBN 978-0312144784 (1995)
- The Confessions of Gordon Brown - (2004)
- My Father's Wake: How The Irish Teach Us To Live, Love And Die - ISBN 978-0306921469 (2017)
- Nine Rules To Conquer Death - ISBN 978-0861541140 (2020)

== Filmography ==
- The Cult of the Suicide Bomber (2005)
- Cult of the Suicide Bomber 2 (2006)
- Cult of the Suicide Bomber 3 (2007)
- Car Bomb (2008)
- Complicit (2013)
