= Snickers =

Brand of chocolate bar

- Logo used since 2026

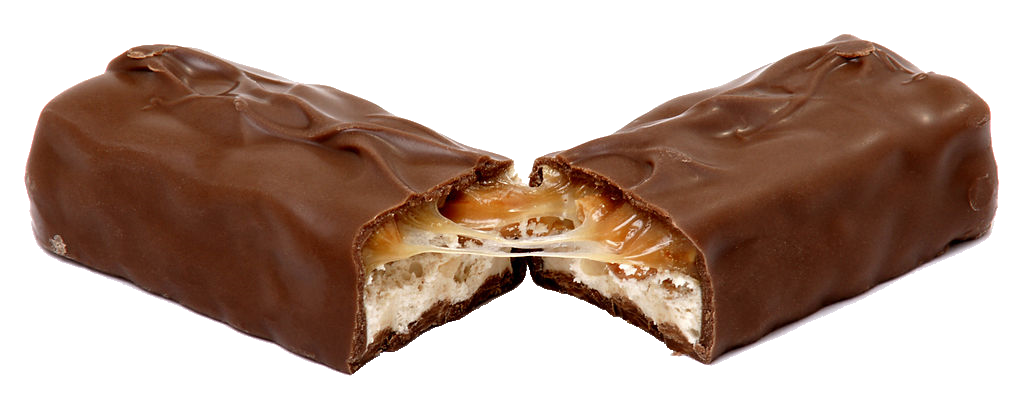
- Product type: Confectionery
- Country: United States
- Introduced: 1930; 96 years ago
- Markets: Worldwide
- Tagline: Maybe You Just Need a Snickers. You're Not You When You're Hungry.
- Website: snickers.com

Snickers (stylized in all caps) is a chocolate bar consisting of nougat topped with caramel and peanuts, all encased in milk chocolate. The bars are made by the American company Mars Inc. The annual global sales of Snickers is over $380 million, and it is widely considered the bestselling candy bar in the world.

Snickers was introduced by Mars in 1930 and named after the Mars family's favorite horse. Snickers has expanded its product line to include variations such as mini, dark chocolate, white chocolate, ice cream bars, and several nut, flavor, and protein-enhanced versions. Ingredients have evolved from its original formulation to adapt to changing consumer preferences and nutritional guidelines. Despite fluctuations in bar size and controversies around health and advertising, Snickers remains a prominent snack worldwide, sponsoring significant sporting events and introducing notable marketing campaigns.

Matching regional names of Mars Inc. bars
Bar type	Brand name		
Bar type	United States	Canada	Rest of the world
Chocolate and nougat	3 Musketeers		Milky Way
Chocolate, nougat and caramel	Milky Way	Mars	
Chocolate, nougat, caramel and almonds	Snickers Almond (Mars before 2003)	—N/a	Mars Almond
Chocolate, nougat, caramel and peanuts	Snickers		Snickers (Marathon before 1990^{*})
Chocolate and caramel (discontinued)	Marathon	—N/a	3 Musketeers ^{†}
Legend: ^{*} In Britain and Ireland only ^{†} 3 Musketiers in German; 3 Mousquetairs in French

== History ==
In 1930, the Mars Candy Factory in Chicago introduced Snickers, named after the favorite horse of the Mars family. The Snickers chocolate bar consists of nougat, peanuts, and caramel with a chocolate coating.

After Forrest Mars Sr. took control of his late father's company in the 1960s, Snickers availability was expanded internationally. It launched in Great Britain and West Germany in 1968 followed by a number of other markets. In both Britain and Ireland, the product was marketed under the name "Marathon" instead. This was allegedly done because of the "Snickers" name similarity to the local term knickers. In 1990, the name in both countries changed to Snickers to align with the global brand. A Marathon retro edition was sold exclusively at the Morrisons supermarket for three months in 2019. ("Marathon" was also the name of an unrelated bar marketed in the 1970s in the United States.) Snickers launched in France in 1989.

There are other Snickers products such as Snickers mini (invented by Carlos Calle), dark chocolate, white chocolate, ice cream bars, Snickers with almonds, Snickers with hazelnuts, Snickers with pecans, Snickers peanut butter bars, Snickers protein and Snickers with Extra Caramel, as well as espresso, fiery, and sweet & salty versions.

In July 2005, Snickers and Mars bars were withdrawn from sale across New South Wales after the Australian manufacturer, MasterFoods, received letters claiming that several bars had been contaminated. Police later said that the extortion attempt was aimed at Sydney's Star City casino rather than at the company. The bars returned to shelves the following month.

In 2024, Mars and Jel Sert collaborated to market Snickers-flavored pudding and pie mix.

== Contents ==
=== Ingredients ===
A circa 1939 ingredient list for the original bar included white sugar, sweet milk chocolate, corn syrup, peanuts, milk condensed with sugar, coconut oil, malted milk, egg whites and salt. By 2019, the ingredients for the original bar had been changed to: milk chocolate (sugar, cocoa butter, chocolate, skim milk, lactose, milkfat, soy lecithin), peanuts, corn syrup, sugar, palm oil, skim milk, lactose, salt, egg whites, artificial flavor.

Snickers
Nutritional value per 47 g
- Energy: 220 kcal (920 kJ)
- Carbohydrates: 29
- Sugars: 24
- Dietary fiber: 1.0
- Fat: 10.0
- Saturated: 4.00
- Trans: 0.2
- Protein: 4.0
Vitamins and minerals
Minerals	Quantity %DV^{†}
Calcium	3% 40 mg
Sodium	5% 110 mg
- Other constituents: Quantity
- Water: 105 mg
- Cholesterol: 5 mg
- ^{†}Percentages estimated using US recommendations for adults. Source: https://ndb.nal.usda.gov/ndb/foods/show/45248489

=== Caloric value ===
The USDA lists the caloric value of a 2-ounce (57 gram) Snickers bar as 280 kilocalories (1,200 kJ). As of 2018 a British marketed bar has a weight of 48 g (1.7 oz), with 245 kcal, and the Canadian bar 52 g (1.8 oz) with 250 kcal.

=== Bar weight ===
Over the years, the bar weight has decreased: Before 2009, in the UK a single Snickers bar had a weight of 62.5 g (2.20 oz). This weight was subsequently reduced to 58 g (2.0 oz) in 2009, and to 48 g (1.7 oz) in 2013. In the United States the listed weight in 2018 was 52.7 g. In Australia, Snickers bars were originally made locally and weighed 53 g (1.9 oz), however in the late 2010s production moved to China and the bars were shrunk to 50 g (1.8 oz). In 2022, production returned to Australia and bars further reduced in weight to 44 g (1.6 oz).

== Products containing Snickers ==
Deep fried chocolate bars (including Snickers and Mars bars) became a specialty in fish-and-chip shops in Scotland in 1995, it also became popular at American state fairs in the early 2000s. The cooked product contains approximately 450 calories (1,900 kJ) per bar.

In 2006, the British Food Commission highlighted celebrity chef Antony Worrall Thompson's "Snickers pie", which contained five Snickers bars among other ingredients, suggesting it was one of the unhealthiest desserts ever; one slice providing "over 1,250 calories (5,200 kJ) from sugar and fat alone", more than half a day's requirement for an average adult. The pie had featured on his BBC Saturday programme some two years earlier and the chef described it as an occasional treat only.

== Advertising ==
=== "It's so satisfying" ===
In 1980, Snickers (and Marathon) ran ads which featured a variety of everyday people discussing why they like Snickers. The ads featured a jingle that said "It's so satisfying" and depicted a hand that would open and close showing a handful of peanuts converting to a Snickers bar. "Packed with peanuts, Snickers really satisfies" was shown in the commercials.

=== 1984 Olympics ===
Mars paid $5 million to have Snickers and M&M's named the "official snack" of the 1984 Summer Olympics, outraging nutritionists. Sports promotions in international games continued to be a prominent marketing tool for Mars, keeping Snickers as an international brand while also selling local bars in some markets.

=== Not Going Anywhere For a While? ===
Beginning in 1995, Snickers ran ads which featured someone making a self-inflicted mistake, with the voice-over saying "Not going anywhere for a while? Grab a Snickers!" The tag line at the end of each ad proclaimed, "Hungry? Why Wait?" Later ads have used the tagline “Rookie mistake? Maybe you just need a Snickers.”

Some of the ads were done in conjunction with the National Football League, with whom Snickers had a sponsorship deal at the time. One ad featured a member of the grounds crew at Arrowhead Stadium painting the field for an upcoming Kansas City Chiefs game in hot, late-summer weather. After finishing one of the end zones, and visibly exhausted, one of the Chiefs players walks up to him and says the field looks great, "but who are the Chefs?", showing that despite all the hard work the painter accidentally omitted the "i" in Chiefs. Another had Marv Levy in the Buffalo Bills locker room lecturing his team that "no one's going anywhere" until the Bills figure out how to actually win a Super Bowl.

=== Snickers Feast ===
In 2007, Snickers launched a campaign which featured Henry VIII and a Viking among others who attend the "Snickers Feast". It consisted of various commercials of the gang and their adventures on the feast.

=== Super Bowl XLI commercial ===
On February 4, 2007, during Super Bowl XLI, Snickers commercials aired. This resulted in complaints by gay and lesbian groups against the maker of the candy bar, Masterfoods USA of Hackettstown, New Jersey, a division of Mars, Incorporated. The commercial showed a pair of auto mechanics accidentally kissing while sharing a Snickers bar. After quickly pulling away, one mechanic sheepishly says, "I think we just accidentally kissed.", and another mechanic frantically exclaims, "Quick! Do something manly!" and in three of the four versions, they do so mostly in the form of injury, including tearing out chest hair, striking each other with a very large pipe wrench, and drinking motor oil and windshield washer fluid. In the fourth version, however, a third mechanic shows up and asks "Is there room for three in this Love Boat?"

Complaints were lodged against Masterfoods that the ads were homophobic. Human Rights Campaign president Joe Solmonese is quoted as saying, "This type of jeering from professional sports figures at the sight of two men kissing fuels the kind of anti-gay bullying that haunts countless gay and lesbian school children on playgrounds all across the country."

Gay and Lesbian Alliance Against Defamation (GLAAD) president Neil Giuliano said "That Snickers, Mars and the NFL would promote and endorse this kind of prejudice is simply inexcusable." Masterfoods has since pulled the ads and the website.>

=== Mr. T ===
In 2006, Mr. T starred in a Snickers advertisement in the UK where he rides up in an army tank and shouts abuse at a football player who appears to be faking an injury, threatening to introduce him to his friend Pain. Another advertisement featured Mr. T launching bars at a swimmer who appeared to refuse to get in a swimming pool because of the cold temperature of the water. In 2008, a European Snickers commercial in which Mr. T uses a Jeep-mounted Minigun to fire Snickers bars at a speedwalker for being a "disgrace to the man race" was pulled after complaints from a US pressure group that the advertisement was homophobic. These advertisements usually ended with Mr. T saying "Snickers: Get Some Nuts!"

=== NASCAR ===
In NASCAR racing, Snickers (and the rest of the Mars affiliated brands) sponsored Kyle Busch's No. 18 Toyota for Joe Gibbs Racing. Prior to that the brand served as a primary sponsor for Ricky Rudd's No. 88 Robert Yates Racing Ford as well as an associate sponsor for the team's No. 38 car driven first by Elliott Sadler and then by David Gilliland, and an associate sponsor for the MB2 Motorsports No. 36 Pontiac driven by Derrike Cope, Ernie Irvan, Ken Schrader, and others. In 1990, Bobby Hillin drove for Stavola Brothers Racing in the No. 8 Snickers Buick, marking the candy's first appearance as a sponsor; it had since been driven by Rick Wilson and Dick Trickle. Mars announced that at the conclusion of the 2022 NASCAR Cup Series season, they would pull their sponsorship from not only Joe Gibbs Racing, but NASCAR entirely and it was replaced by Monster Energy.

=== FIFA World Cup and UEFA Euro sponsorship ===
Snickers was the Official Sponsor of the FIFA World Cup from 1990 until 1998 editions and the 1996 UEFA European Championship. Snickers was also the main sponsor of the Champions League in 1992–93 and 1993–94, Asian Cup 2011 and African Cup of Nations 2019.

=== You're Not You When You're Hungry ===
In 2010, a new advertising campaign was launched, usually based around people turning into different people (usually celebrities) as a result of hunger (taking the new campaign's name "You're Not You When You're Hungry" quite literally). The tagline varied depending on the commercial's location or what variety the commercial is showing. The American adverts initially ended with the tagline "Snickers Satisfies". Steve Burns, best known as the first host of the children's show Blue's Clues has done the voice of the announcer. BBDO New York said this campaign made Snickers the number one candy bar, up from seventh. In 2020, USA Today's Ad Meter named it the best Super Bowl campaign of the past 25 years.

In 2010, Betty White and Abe Vigoda appeared in the first Snickers commercial in this campaign, playing American football. The commercial was ranked by ADBOWL as the best advertisement of the year. This commercial was also briefly spoofed in an episode of SportsNation on ESPN2 with Michelle Beadle playing the role instead of Betty White in 2011. Later that year, Snickers commercials featured singers Aretha Franklin and Liza Minnelli, and comedians Richard Lewis and Roseanne Barr. A 2011 commercial featured actors Joe Pesci and Don Rickles.

In Latin America, the slogan was the same as in the UK version, except that men doing extreme sports turning into the Mexican singer Anahí as a result of hunger. Brazilian versions of the ad featured actresses Betty Faria and Cláudia Raia.

In 2013, Robin Williams and Bobcat Goldthwait appeared in a Snickers football commercial. Russian duo t.A.T.u. appeared in a Japanese Snickers commercial as themselves throwing a tantrum in a baseball game before eating the chocolate reverts them into normal baseball players. In March 2014, a commercial featuring Godzilla was released to promote the 2014 Godzilla film. In the commercial, Godzilla is shown hanging out with humans on the beach, riding dirt bikes, and water skiing; he only begins rampaging once he is hungry. After being fed a Snickers bar, he resumes having fun with the humans.

In February 2015, Snickers' Super Bowl XLIX commercial featured a parody of a scene from an episode of The Brady Bunch entitled "The Subject Was Noses." In the commercial, Carol and Mike try to calm down a very angry Machete (played by Danny Trejo). When the parents give Machete a Snickers bar, he reverts into Marcia before an irate Jan (played by Steve Buscemi) rants upstairs and walks away. In a second commercial set earlier, Marcia (as Machete) angrily brushes her hair while yelling through her door.

In 2016, for Super Bowl 50, another Snickers commercial was made, featuring Willem Dafoe (as Marilyn Monroe) and Eugene Levy, where Willem Dafoe complains about filming the iconic "subway grate" scene in The Seven Year Itch. After being given a Snickers, he turns into Marilyn and goes ahead with the scene, with Levy operating the fan below, commenting that the scene will not make the movie's final cut, that nobody would want to see it. That same year, the Middle East produced their own Snickers commercial featuring DC Comics' The Joker as the recipient of the Snickers bar, before turning back into a casual poker playing buddy.

In 2018, Brazil World Cup winner Ronaldo is seen celebrating a goal for Argentina. When he notices the confused faces around him, he eats a Snickers and returns to normal.

The UK version of the campaign usually used British celebrities and, up until 2018, retained the slogan from the Mr. T. era. In the initial advertisement, Joan Collins and Stephanie Beacham featured as locker room footballers who had turned into them due to being hungry. In 2014, Rowan Atkinson as Mr. Bean returned on television by appearing on several UK Snickers commercials and cinema spots, in place of a martial arts master who had turned into him as a result of hunger. Later, in 2018, Elton John appeared in an advertisement where he turned into African American rapper Boogie after he eats a Snickers; the latter had turned into the former due to hunger (the slogan appeared on a turntable in this advertisement).

=== Nitro sponsorship ===
In 2013, Snickers began to sponsor Nitro at Six Flags Great Adventure.

=== Maybe You Just Need A Snickers ===
In 2020, a new campaign was trialed, focusing on the theme of people doing things that contradicted what they think they are doing, such as a man crawling along rocky ground when he thought he was climbing a rock face, the new slogan for this commercial, "Confused? Maybe you just need a Snickers", indicating hunger-induced confusion. Nitro at Six Flags Great Adventure also features this advertisement style (see above). This campaign was revived in the UK in 2024 to promote the 2024 UEFA European Football Championships, featuring footballers Bukayo Saka and Luka Modrić. In 2025, Snickers announced an ambassador for their brand- Mingyu from popular boy group Seventeen.

=== WrestleMania ===
Snickers has been an official sponsor of WWE's WrestleMania events, including WrestleMania 2000, 22, 32, 33, 34, 35, 36, 37, 38, 39, XL, 41 and now 42. while its Cruncher variant sponsored WrestleMania X-Seven, XIX, XX and 21. Since then, Snickers has sponsored superstars such as Enzo Amore and Big Cass with their signature term, SAWFT, which is labelled at the back of the chocolate bar.

=== Six Flags Fright Fest ===
Since 2011, Snickers has been the official sponsor of Six Flags' annual Fright Fest event at its theme parks.

== Controversy ==
=== King-Size phaseout ===
A replacement for the king size Snickers bar was launched in the UK in 2004, and designed to conform to the September 2004 Food and Drink Federation (FDF) "Manifesto for Food and Health". Part of the FDF manifesto was seven pledges of action to encourage the food and drink industry to be more health conscious. Reducing portion size, clearer food labels, and reduction of the levels of fat, sugar, and salt were among the FDF pledges. Mars Incorporated pledged to phase out their king-size bars in 2005 and replace them with shareable bars. A Mars spokesman said: "Our king-size bars that come in one portion will be changed so they are shareable or can be consumed on more than one occasion. The name king-size will be phased out."

These were eventually replaced by the 'Duo' – a double bar pack. Though this change to Duos reduced the weight from 3.5 to 3.29 ounces (99 to 93 g), the price remained the same. The packaging has step-by-step picture instructions of how to open a Duo into two bars, in four simple actions. As Mars stated fulfillment of their promise, the Duo format was met with criticism by the National Obesity Forum and National Consumer Council.

=== Australian recall ===
In December 2000, tens of thousands of Snickers and Mars Bars were removed from New South Wales store shelves due to a series of threatening letters which resulted in fears that the chocolate bars had been poisoned. Mars received letters from an unidentified individual indicating that they planned to plant poisoned chocolate bars on store shelves. The last letter sent included a Snickers bar contaminated with a substance which was later identified as rat poison. The letters claimed that there were seven additional chocolate bars which had been tampered with and which were for sale to the public. As a precautionary measure, Mars issued a massive recall. Mars said that there had been no demand for money and complaints directed to an unidentified third party.

=== Accusations of homophobia ===
Snickers aired a commercial in Spain in August 2021. The 20-second video featured Spanish influencer Aless Gibaja at a restaurant, ordering "a sexy orange juice with Vitamins A, B, and C." A nearby friend, seeming confused, offers a Snickers bar—as part of the candy bar's ongoing marketing slogan of "You're not you when you're hungry"—and Gibaja is seemingly transformed into a bearded man with a low voice. The video began circulating online after airing, and received criticism as it was perceived to be homophobic. Irene Montero, Spain's Minister for Equality, condemned the commercial, questioning "to whom it might have seemed like a good idea to use homophobia as a business strategy". She also added that it was "shameful and unfortunate" for Snickers to "continue to perpetuate stereotypes and promote homophobia". Snickers later ceased airing the commercial and issued an apology for "any misunderstanding".

== Snickers products ==
The following variants are available in the United States.

- Snickers Original
- Snickers Milk Chocolate
- Snickers Almond
- Snickers Peanut Butter
- Snickers Pecan
- Snickers White Chocolate
- Snickers Peanut Brownie
- Snickers Almond Brownie Dark Chocolate
- Snickers Ice Cream
- Snickers Ice Cream Bars
- Snickers 100 Calories Chocolate
- Snickers Creamy Peanut Butter
- Snickers Crunchy Peanut Butter
- Snickers Easter Egg
- Snickers Squares
- Snickers Candy Cane
- Snickers Xtreme

== See also ==
- Baby Ruth
- Milky Way
- Snickers salad
- List of chocolate bar brands
- List of candies
