= Storme Toolis =

British actress (born 1992)

- Born: Storme Toolis; 26 November 1992 (age 33); London, England
- Occupation: Actor
- Parent(s): Dea Birkett; Kevin Toolis

Storme Toolis (born 26 November 1992) is a British actress from London.

== Early life ==
Toolis was born and raised in London. Her father journalist Kevin Toolis was born in Edinburgh; his parents originated from Achill Island in County Mayo, Ireland. Her mother is Dea Birkett, a British television and print journalist from Surrey; she has a younger brother and a younger sister. Toolis spent seven years as an aspiring actress at the Ovalhouse.

== Career ==
She first appeared on film in Channel 4's The Inbetweeners as an extra, and then as a minor character in The Inbetweeners Movie, based on the earlier television series, subsequently joining the cast of New Tricks as Holly Griffin in August 2013 in series 10 episode 5, "Cry Me a River", of the show.

Toolis has cerebral palsy and uses a wheelchair. She is an advocate of the rights of disabled actors to play disabled roles.

For her role in New Tricks, Toolis was described as "one of the few disabled actors in Britain, and across the world, to play a minor role in a mainstream drama where the disability of her character is not a feature of the plot, and her role has been compared to Walt Jr in the US Breaking Bad series."

Toolis also partook in the Malteser series of adverts for the Paralympics. The advert was praised for its portrayal of people with disabilities.

Toolis was the first disabled actress to take on the title role of Josephine in the West End version of the play A Day in the Death of Joe Egg.
