= Dea Birkett =

British writer, journalist, broadcaster and a former circus performer

Dea Birkett FRSL
- Born: Dea Birkett; 1958 (age 67–68); United Kingdom
- Other name: Dea Toolis
- Occupation: Journalist
- Known for: Broadcaster and circus Performer
- Spouse: Kevin Toolis
- Children: 3

Dea Birkett (born 1958) is a British writer, journalist, broadcaster and a former circus performer.

== Biography ==
Birkett was brought up in the suburbs of Surrey, England. As a child she watched the circus parade through her town, which made her want to be in a circus.

In 1992, Birkett joined the circus after being awarded a Fellowship from the Winston Churchill Foundation. It enabled her to purchase a caravan, travel to Italy and learn from the Togni Italian circus dynasty. The fellowship lasted four months, during which Birkett worked as a general circus hand and elephant girl.

Birkett stopped working in circus in 1993, and developed a career as an writer and broadcaster.

In 2018, Birkett returned to circus life, coinciding with turning 60 years of age. That year, she set up a community interest company called Circus250 to celebrate the 250th anniversary of the birth of modern circus, and raise awareness of the art genre. This included a national programme of hundreds of events across the United Kingdom.

== Career ==
During her time as a journalist Birkett had written on social issues for The Guardian and broadcast for BBC Radio 4.

She is creative director of the charity Kids in Museums and Ringmaster of Circus 250.

She was awarded the Somerset Maugham Award in 1993 for her book Jella, which follows Birkett's experience of a journey from Africa to the UK. She cites inspiration from Victorian women travellers, like Isabella Bird and Mary Kingsley. Birkett retraced Kingsley's route through West Africa, using Kingsley's 1897 book Travels in West Africa. Including, a return journey to the United Kingdom by ship.

She was elected a Fellow of the Royal Society of Literature in 2000.

== Personal life ==
Birkett is married to journalist and filmmaker Kevin Toolis.

She has three children, including actress Storme Toolis, and River Toolis, who trained as a juggler.

== Bibliography ==
- Spinsters Abroad (1989)
- Jella: A Woman at Sea (1992)
- Mary Kingsley: Imperial Adventuress (1992)
- Serpent in Paradise (1997) (about her 1991 stay on Pitcairn Island)
