= Snickers pie =

Chocolate dessert

- Alternative names: Chocolate Snickers cheesecake
- Type: Pie
- Course: Dessert
- Place of origin: United Kingdom
- Created by: Antony Worrall Thompson
- Invented: 2006
- Serving temperature: Cold
- Main ingredients: Snickers, mascarpone, soft cheese, double cream, chocolate
- Similar dishes: Cheesecake, chocolate tart

Snickers pie is a chocolate dessert made with five Snickers bars, mascarpone and soft cheese. The recipe appeared on the BBC cookery show Saturday Kitchen, where it was made by Antony Worrall Thompson.

The Food Commission called the Snickers pie "one of the most unhealthy recipes ever published". Antony Worrall Thompson said the pie was intended as a treat for children and was not meant for regular consumption. The recipe was removed from the BBC website.

According to the Food Commission's calculations, a single serving contains over 1,250 calories, the equivalent of 22 teaspoons of fat and 11 teaspoons of sugar. However, this assumes a portion size of 1/4 of the pie, contrary to the recipe which indicates the dish serves 12 adults or 16 children.

The original recipe was invented in 2006, when in the UK a single Snickers bar had a weight of 62.5 g. This weight was subsequently reduced to 58g in 2009, and to 48 g in 2013.

== See also ==
- List of British desserts
- List of desserts
