= Twix =

Chocolate cookie bar

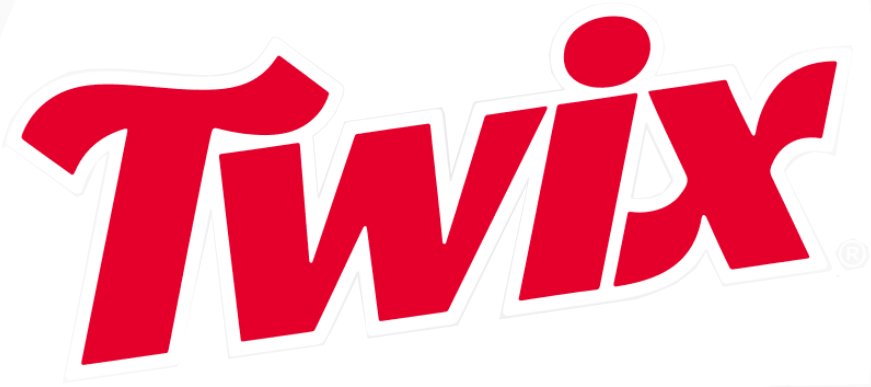

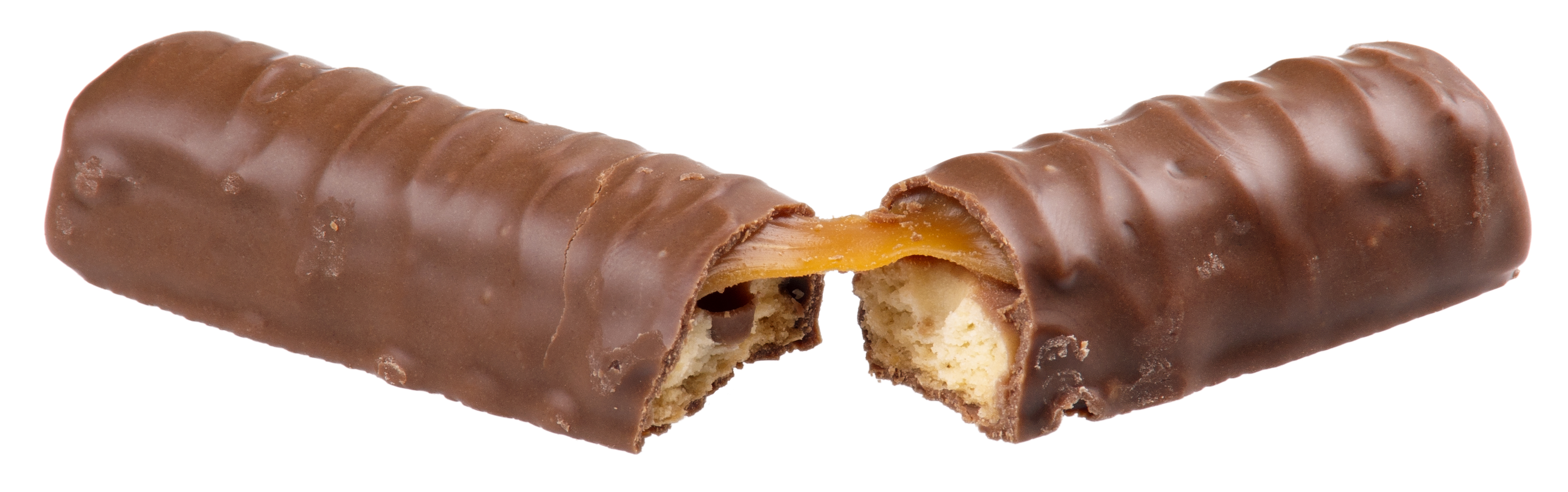
- Product type: Confectionery
- Current owner: Mars Inc.
- Country: United Kingdom
- Introduced: 1967; 59 years ago
- Markets: Worldwide
- Website: twix.com

Twix is a chocolate bar made by Mars Inc., consisting of a biscuit applied with other confectionery toppings and coatings (most frequently caramel and milk chocolate). Twix are packaged with one (mini and snack sizes), two (standard and xtra sizes, xtra having double-length biscuits), or four bars (king size) in a wrapper.

== History ==
Twix was first produced in the United Kingdom in 1967 at Mars's Slough factory. The name is a portmanteau of "twin sticks". Mars have also labelled the product in speech as the "Twix Cookie Bar".

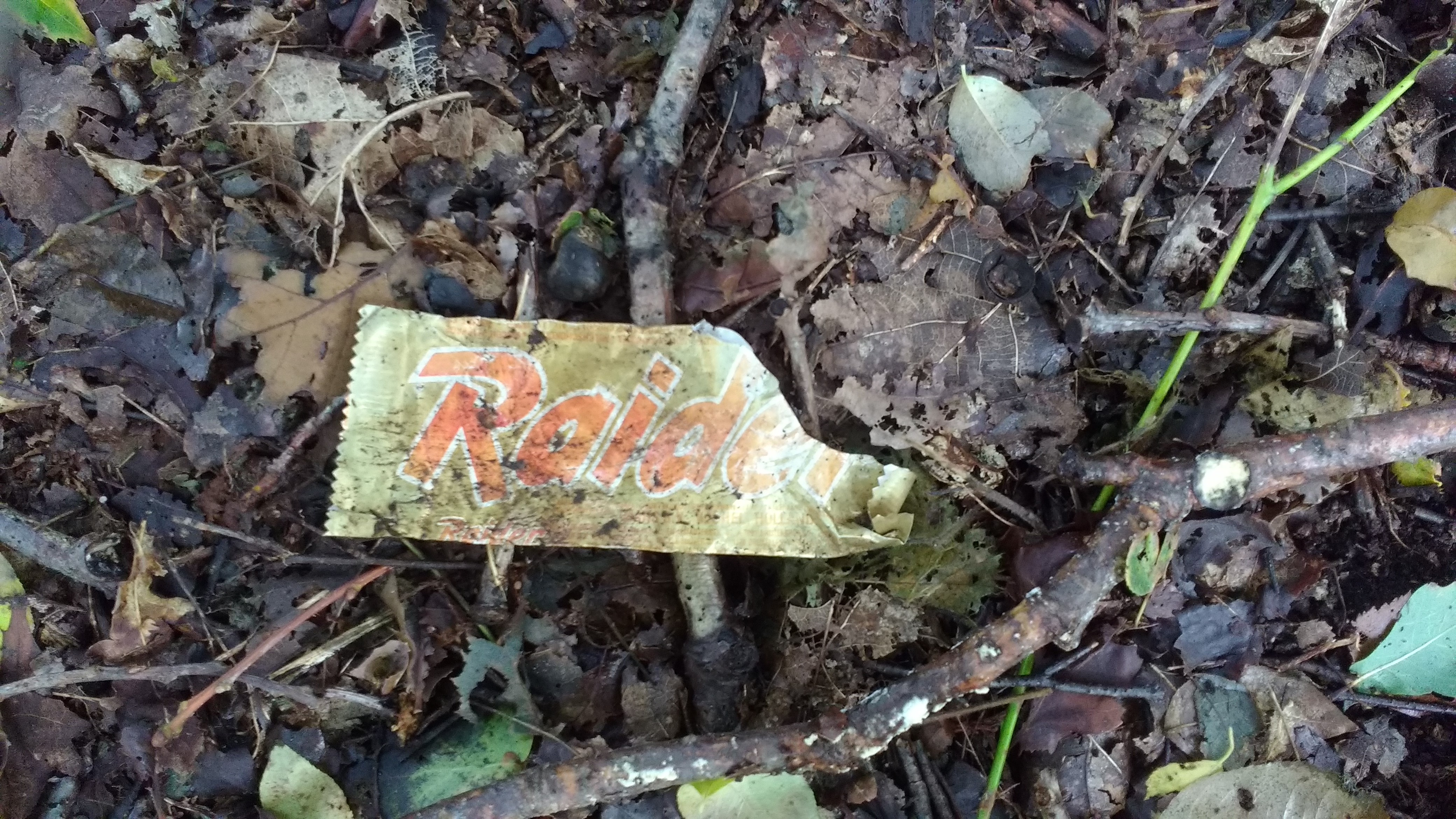
Raider wrapper from 1989, found as litter

The product was introduced in the United States in 1976 and again in 1979. Twix was called Raider in mainland Europe for many years before its name was changed in 1991 to match the international brand name. In Denmark, Finland, Norway, Sweden, and Turkey that name change was made in 2000. The Raider brand was resurrected for retro editions sold in Germany in 2009, in the Netherlands, Belgium, Finland and Sweden in 2015, and Switzerland in late 2023.

Twix launched in Australia in 1989. In 1992, it launched in Russia and Czechoslovakia.

== Production ==
Twix bars for the North American market are made in Cleveland, Tennessee, US. For Europe and Africa they are produced in Veghel, the Netherlands alongside Mars bars and other Mars, Incorporated chocolates.

== Advertising ==
In 2012, Twix launched a campaign called "Pick a Side," creating a rivalry between the two "sides" of the Twix bar, which are made in different factories. Each bar was given its own packaging, labeled as either a "Right Twix" or a "Left Twix," even though both sides are identical and made on the same packaging line. In 2017, Mars released packages of Twix labelled "Two Left" and "Two Right," implying each package contained either two left Twix or two right Twix. In a poll on Twix's official website, 50% of people voted they preferred the left Twix and 50% preferred the right Twix.

Twix also released a fictional story about the creation of Twix called "The Tale of Seamus and Earl." Two brothers, Seamus and Earl, worked together "to combine biscuit, caramel and chocolate into one beautiful bar," but while making the biscuit bar, the two feuded and disputed techniques, such as how to add the chocolate or caramel. The left Twix supposedly "flowed" caramel onto the biscuit (cookie in North America) base, before "bathing" the bar in chocolate, with the right Twix having its caramel "cascaded" onto the biscuit base, and the chocolate "cloaked". At the grand unveiling of the Twix, the two brothers accidentally broke the Twix bar; that being the final straw, the two brothers split the company into two factories: one for left Twix and one for right Twix.

In June 2025, the Advertising Standards Authority in the UK banned a Twix advertisement from television for glorifying dangerous driving.

== Twix products ==
=== Bars ===
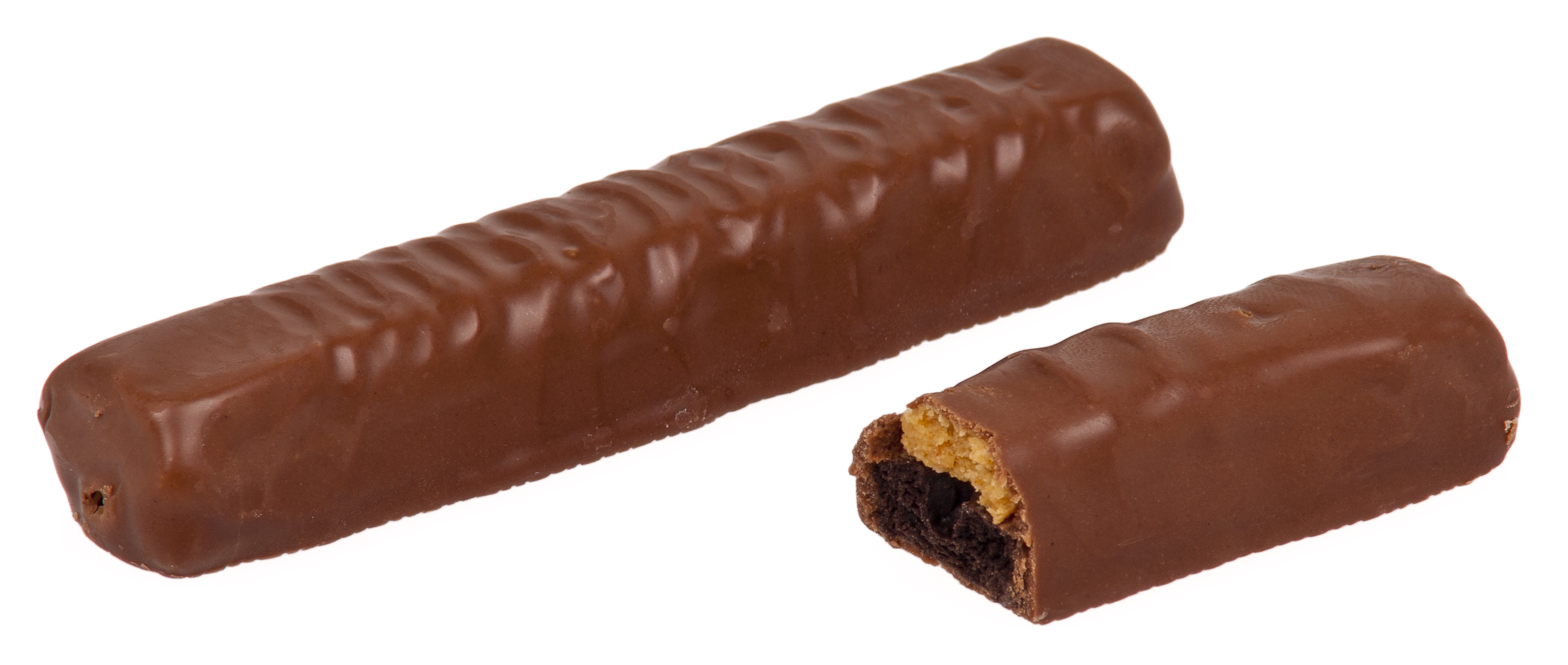
Unwrapped peanut butter Twix

The following flavours are available in the United States.

- The original Twix was introduced in 1976 and reintroduced in 1979. It consists of chocolate, caramel and a biscuit.
- Twix Salted Caramel is a variation of the original Twix bar. It has a chocolate biscuit, but instead of the usual caramel centre, it has a salted caramel centre.
- Twix Cookies & Creme was introduced in 1991. It consists of a chocolate bar with cookie bits and a white creme taking the place of caramel.
- Twix Ice Cream Bar is a frozen confection. It consists of vanilla ice cream coated in caramel, then enrobed in milk chocolate.
- Twix 100 Calories consists of a caramel-covered biscuit with a chocolate coating. It has 100 calories per serving.
- Twix Cookie Dough is a variation on the classic Twix candy bar. It has a cookie dough centre instead of the traditional caramel and is covered in milk chocolate.
- In Finland, Twix White has a white chocolate outer shell.

=== Discontinued products ===
- Twix Chocolate Fudge is a candy bar produced from 1990 to 1992. It is a variation of the original Twix bar, but with a chocolate fudge center instead of caramel. The bar also has a chocolate biscuit bottom and is coated in milk chocolate.
- Twix Peanut Butter was introduced in 1985 and was marketed until 1997. It consists of a chocolate biscuit filled with peanut butter instead of caramel.

=== Shrinkflation ===
Like many confectionery items, Twix has been accused of shrinkflation, where Mars, Incorporated has decreased the size of the bar. This accusation results from the size of a Twix bar decreasing over time, while the price has increased.

Weight changes in grams
Product	2014	2018	Change
Twix Twin Bars 4-pack	200	160	−20.00%
Twix Funsize bag	320	275	−14.06%
Twix Twin Bar	58	50	−13.79%

Price change in pence per 100g
Price	2014	2018	Change
Twix Twin Bars 4-pack	0.6	0.86	+43.33%
Twix Funsize bag	0.9	1.01	+12.22%
Twix Twin Bar	0.78	1.2	+53.85%
