= Maltesers =

Confectionery product made by Mars

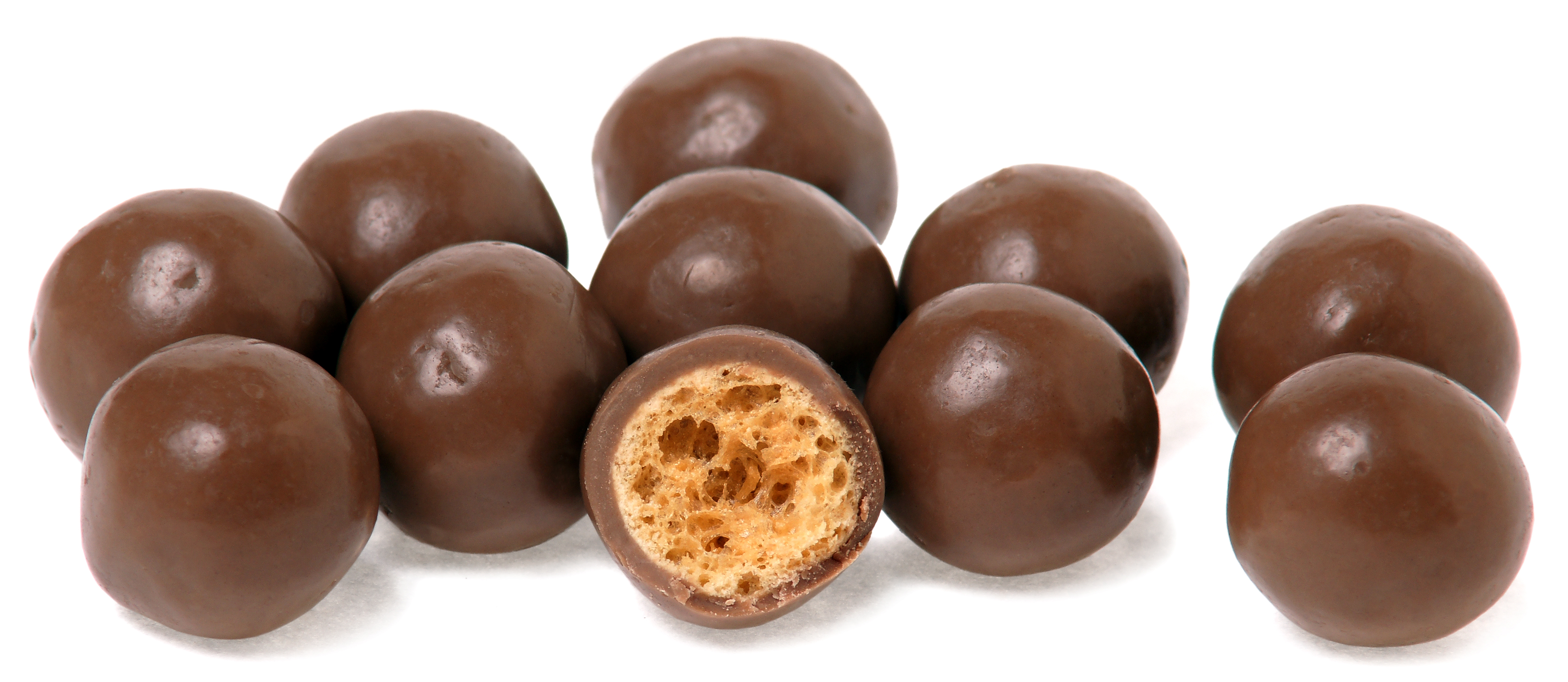
- Product type: Confectionery
- Current owner: Mars Inc.
- Country: United Kingdom
- Introduced: 1937; 89 years ago
- Markets: Europe, Australia, New Zealand, Canada, United States and Asia
- Tagline: The Lighter Way to Enjoy Chocolate.
- Website: maltesers.co.uk

Maltesers is a British confectionery product manufactured by Mars Inc. first launched in 1937. Maltesers consist of a spheroid malted milk centre surrounded by milk chocolate. The slogan is "The lighter way to enjoy chocolate".

Maltesers are sold in many markets around the world in a variety of packaging, including plastic bags (ranging in size from small 'fun-size' upwards), larger cardboard boxes and tubes, and plastic buckets (ranging in size from medium to very large). They also have medium-sized "teasers" in Celebrations boxes. Maltesers are also one of the types of chocolate included in Mars's Revels assortment.

== History ==
Maltesers were created by the American Forrest Mars Sr. at the Mars factory in Slough in 1936, and first sold in 1937. They were originally described as "energy balls" and aimed at slimming women.

Maltesers' slogan, as of 2016, is "The lighter way to enjoy chocolate". Earlier slogans have included: "The chocolates with the less fattening centre", "No ordinary chocolate" and "Nothing pleases like Maltesers". In the 1930s, advertisements claimed that the Maltesers malted milk centre is one-seventh as fattening as ordinary chocolate centres; this led marketers to claim it was beneficial for weight loss.

In Australia, Mars signed a production deal with MacRobertson's in 1954, but then switched to Cadbury in 1963.

In 2011, the product gained Fairtrade accreditation in the UK and Republic of Ireland by sourcing all their cocoa and sugar under Fairtrade Terms. In 2016, Maltesers’ commercials in the Britain began featuring disabled actors, including actress Storme Toolis, which have promoted the brand. Celebrating universally awkward situations, the adverts were inspired by real-life stories from disabled people.

In January 2017, Maltesers officially became available in the United States for the first time. The factory in Newmarket, Ontario, Canada produces the Maltesers for the North American market; it is expected the factory exports about 80 percent of its production to the United States.

== Ingredients ==
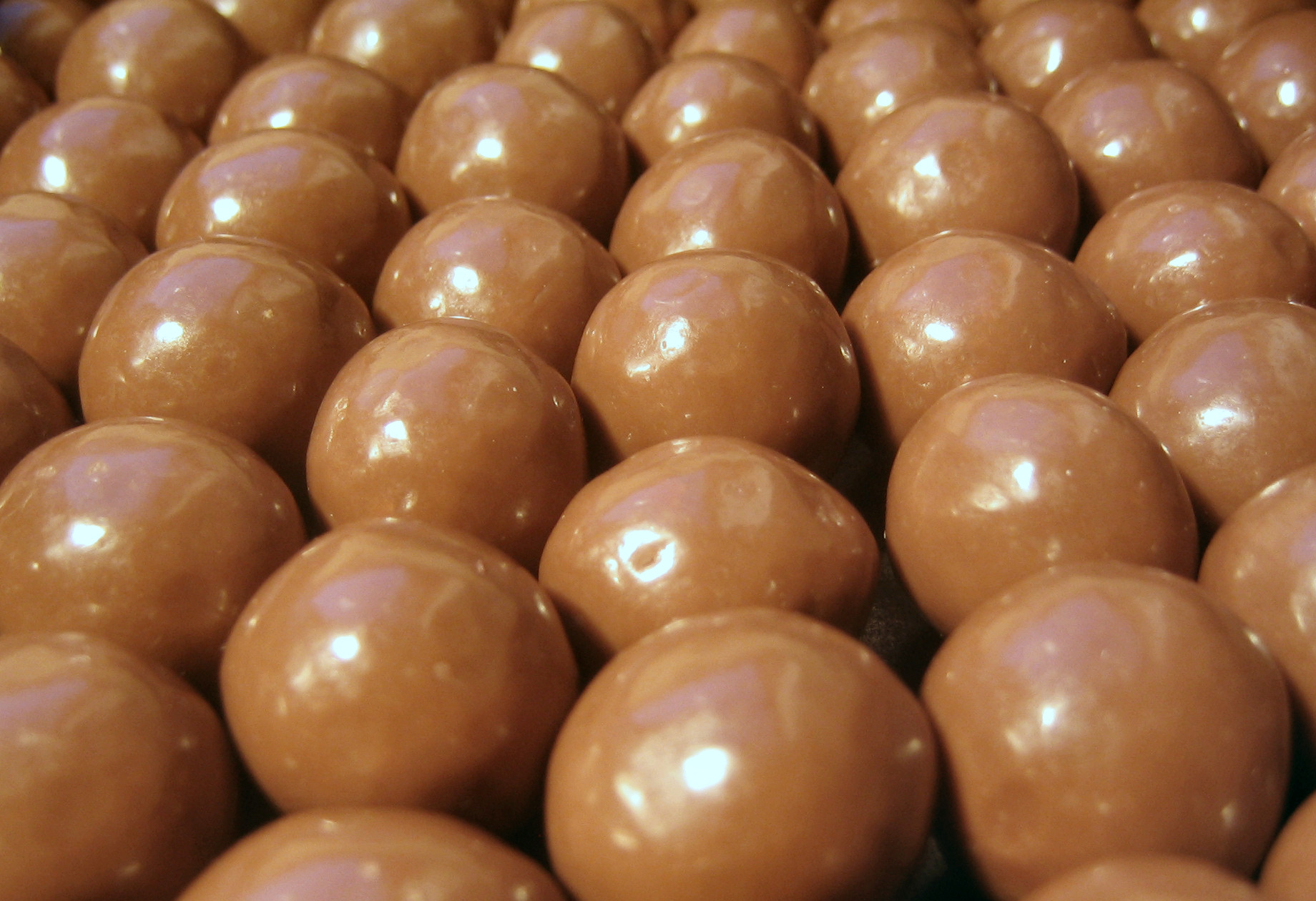
Tray of Maltesers

In Europe, the ingredients are: sugar, skimmed milk powder, cocoa butter, glucose syrup, barley malt extract, cocoa mass, palm fat, lactose, demineralised whey powder, milk fat, wheat flour, emulsifiers (E442, soya lecithin, E492), palm oil, raising agents (E500, E501, E341), salt, gelling agent (pectin), flavouring.

In Canada and the United States, the ingredients are: sugar, modified milk ingredients, malted milk powder (malted barley, corn syrup, modified milk ingredients, wheat flour, modified and hydrogenated palm oil, sugar, wheat gluten, sodium bicarbonate, potassium bicarbonate, salt), cocoa butter, cocoa mass, corn syrup, palm and palm kernel oil, lactose, malted barley extract, soy lecithin, ammonium salt of phosphorylated glyceride, pectin, sorbitan tristearate, artificial flavour.

In Australia and New Zealand, the ingredients are: sugar, milk solids, cocoa butter, glucose syrup (sources include wheat), barley malt extract, cocoa mass, vegetable fat, emulsifiers (soy lecithin, 492), wheat gluten, raising agents (501, 500), salt, natural flavour (vanilla extract), pectin.

== Varieties ==
- "White Maltesers", Maltesers made with a white chocolate coating.
- "Dark Maltesers", Maltesers made with a dark chocolate coating.
- "Mint Maltesers", Maltesers made with a mint centre and milk chocolate coating.
- "MaltEaster bunnies", a bunny made out of Maltesers. Available over the Easter period each year and have been since Easter 2010. Mini versions were also available in 2015. Orange flavoured bunnies and white chocolate mini bunnies were introduced in 2021. A popcorn-flavoured variety was introduced to the British market in 2025.
- "Maltesers Teaser", chocolate coated miniature balls in a bar format, available since March 26, 2013.
- "Maltesers Teasers" chocolate spread.
- Maltesers ''Merryteaser Reindeer''. Standard and miniature reindeer shaped chocolate-covered honeycomb, available in the run up to Christmas.
- Maltesers Reindeer – Mint flavour
- Maltesers Malty Hot Chocolate.
- "Maltesers Buttons", button-shaped Maltesers which features the signature Mars chocolate with tiny malt balls within. Launched in 2018.
- "Maltesers Truffles". Launched in 2018.
- "Honeycomb Maltesers"
- "Raspberry Maltesers"
- Maltesers Popcorn – Popcorn flavour

== See also ==
- Whoppers
