= Milky Way (chocolate bar) =

Brand of chocolate confectionery

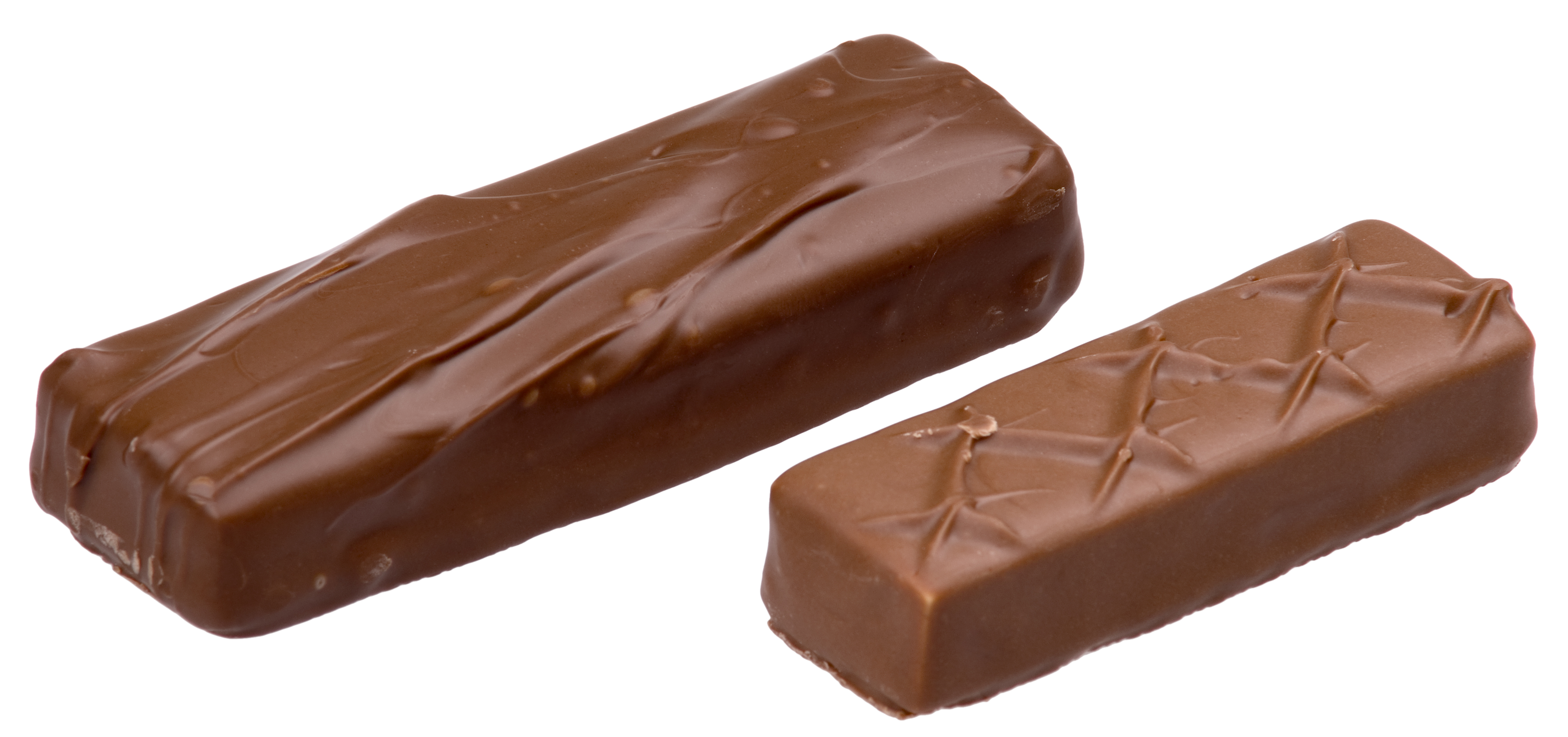
- A U.S. Milky Way bar (left) and a global Milky Way bar (right)
- Product type: Confectionery
- Current owner: Mars Inc.
- Country: United States
- Introduced: 1923; 103 years ago
- Website: milkywaybar.com

Matching regional names of Mars Inc. bars
Bar type	Brand name		
Bar type	United States	Canada	Rest of the world
Chocolate and nougat	3 Musketeers		Milky Way
Chocolate, nougat and caramel	Milky Way	Mars	
Chocolate, nougat, caramel and almonds	Snickers Almond (Mars before 2003)	—N/a	Mars Almond
Chocolate, nougat, caramel and peanuts	Snickers		Snickers (Marathon before 1990^{*})
Chocolate and caramel (discontinued)	Marathon	—N/a	3 Musketeers ^{†}
Legend: ^{*} In Britain and Ireland only ^{†} 3 Musketiers in German; 3 Mousquetairs in French

Milky Way is an American brand of malt-flavored milk chocolate-covered confectionery snacks manufactured and marketed by Mars Inc. since 1923. Created by Frank Mars, it was his first chocolate bar product. There are two varieties of Milky Way: the original American bar made of nougat and caramel, which has been marketed as the Mars bar outside the United States; and the global Milky Way bar which has no caramel, and is marketed as 3 Musketeers in the U.S. and Canada.

== U.S. version ==
The Milky Way bar is made of nougat, topped with caramel and covered with milk chocolate. It was created in 1923 by Frank C. Mars and originally manufactured in Minneapolis, Minnesota. The name and taste derived from a then-popular malted milk drink (milkshake) of the day, not after the astronomical galaxy.

On March 10, 1925, the Milky Way trademark was registered in the U.S., claiming a first-use date of 1922. In 1924, the Milky Way bar was introduced nationally, with sales totalling $800,000 that year. The chocolate for the chocolate coating was supplied by Hershey's.

=== Ingredients ===
The American Milky Way bar has 240 calories in each 52.2 gram bar; the Milky Way Midnight has 220 calories in each 50 gram bar; and the Milky Way Simply Caramel bar has 250 calories in each 54 gram bar.

=== Variations ===
By 1926, two variants were available: chocolate nougat with milk chocolate coating, and vanilla nougat with a dark chocolate coating, each selling for 5¢. In June 1932, the bar was marketed as a two-piece bar, and four years later, in 1936, the chocolate and vanilla were separated. The vanilla version with a dark chocolate coating was called "Forever Yours" and was marketed under this name until 1979, then Milky Way Dark was reintroduced in 1989. Later "Milky Way Dark" was renamed "Milky Way Midnight".

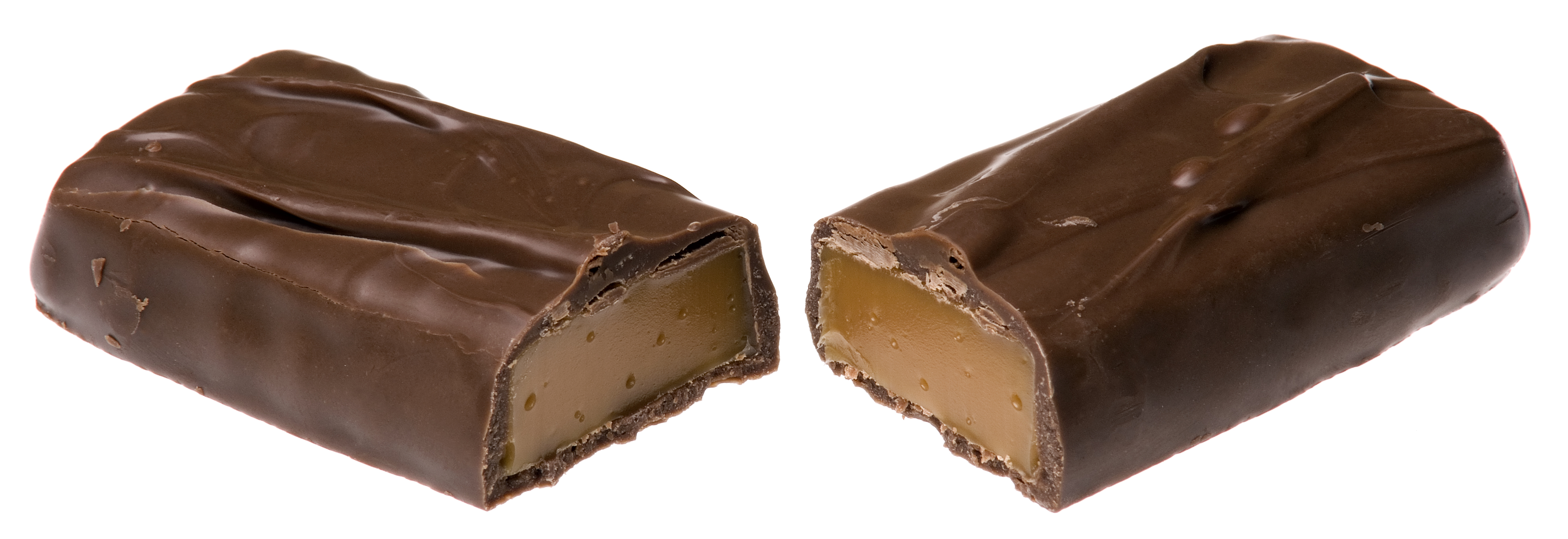
Milky Way Simply Caramel bar

In 2010, the Milky Way Simply Caramel bar went on sale, a version with caramel covered in milk chocolate and without nougat. In 2011, Mars introduced a small size (marketed as fun size) Simply Caramel bar. A salted caramel version has since been introduced. Milky Way Simply Caramel was discontinued in the summer of 2023.

In 2012, Milky Way Caramel Apple Minis went on sale as a limited offer for the Halloween season.

In late summer of 2018, Milky Way Fudge, which substitutes chocolate fudge nougat for malt nougat, was introduced nationwide.

In 2024, Mars and Jel Sert collaborated to market Milky Way-flavored pudding and pie mix.

=== Marketing ===
In 1935, Mars used the marketing slogan "The sweet you can eat between meals," later using "At work, rest and play, you get three great tastes in a Milky Way." By 2006, Mars used the slogan "Comfort in every bar" in the U.S. and most recently "Life's better the Milky Way."

In November 2012, a new print and digital advertising campaign was launched in the U.S. called "Sorry, I was eating a Milky Way". The campaign portrayed the comical aftermath of what happens after someone (off camera) is distracted due to eating a Milky Way bar. This campaign originated from the suggestion that eating a Milky Way bar may be a slow, involved process.

== Global version ==
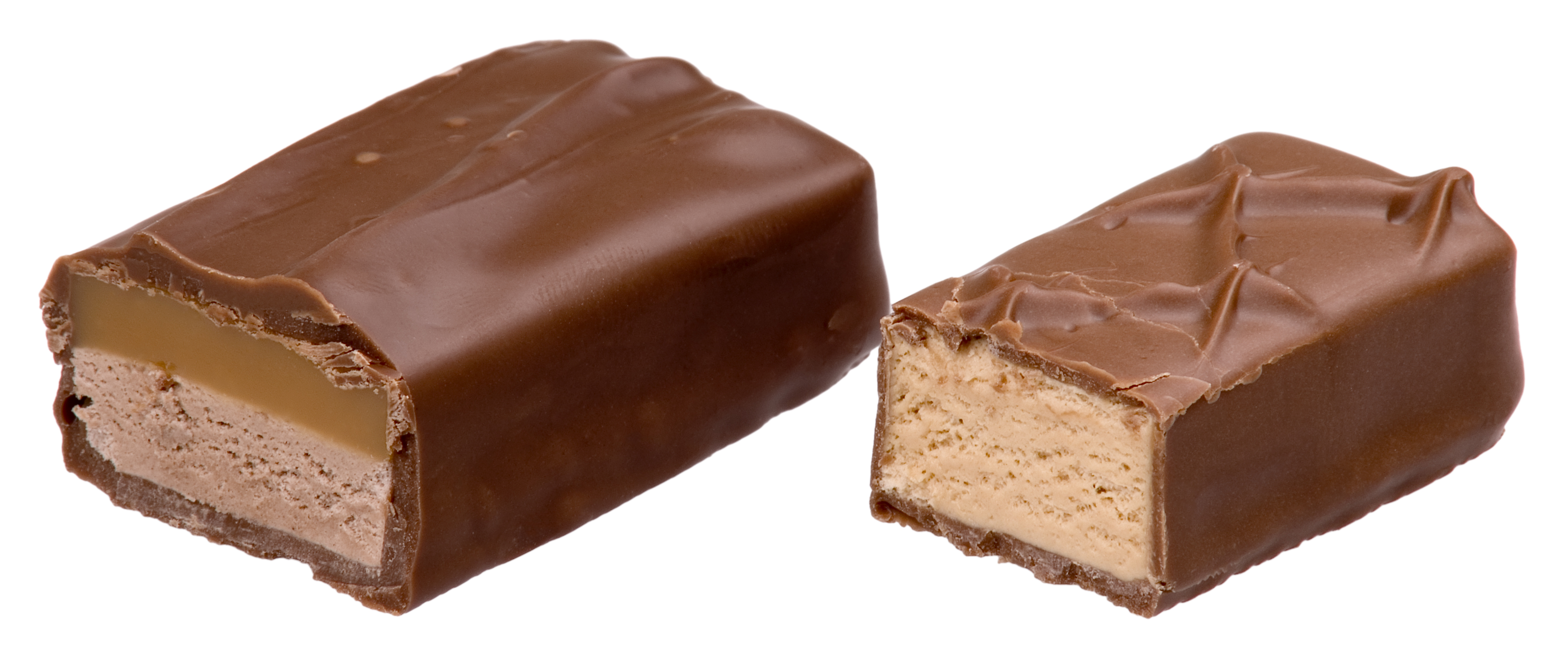
The U.S. (left) and global (right) bars each feature different types of filling.

The version of the Milky Way bar sold outside the United States has no caramel topping. It is the equivalent of the American/Canadian 3 Musketeers bar with minor differences. The global Milky Way consists of a nougat centre that is considerably less dense than that of the American Milky Way bar and the global Mars bar. Because of this low density (0.88 g/cm^{3}), it floats in milk, an attribute highlighted in an advertising campaign in several European countries.

This Milky Way was introduced in 1935 by Forrest Mars Sr.'s company in England.

=== Variations ===
In Australia, a flavored milk drink called Milky Way Shake was sold from 1991 to 1993. A "Milky Way Lucky Dip" was also later sold described as a "Kinder Surprise clone".

Also available in Europe are Milky Way Crispy Rolls, chocolate-covered wafer rolls with milk-cream fillings, first launched in Germany in 1994. Milky Way cakes have also been marketed.

A variant of the Milky Way bar branded 'Milky Way Magic Stars', created by Barnaby Edwards, is marketed by Mars in Britain, first launched in 1995. It consists of small aerated chocolate star shapes with each star engraved with a different smiley face, representing one of the "magic star" characters portrayed on the packaging and referenced in the advertising: Pop Star, Jess Star, Bright Star, Super Star, Twinkle Star, Falling Star, Happy Star, Sport Star, Clever Star and Baby Star.

Similar to Nutella (sans the signature hazelnuts), a Milky Way spread exists, although its availability is very limited. It was sold for several years in Australia, starting circa 1997, packaged in a jar with the spread itself layered in brown-and-white stripes. It is also available for import from Germany, although this version has the colours in two separate partitions.

Mars also formerly sold the Flyte bar, which was identical to the old-style chocolate flavored Milky Way, marketed in twin packs and discontinued in 2015.

=== Marketing ===
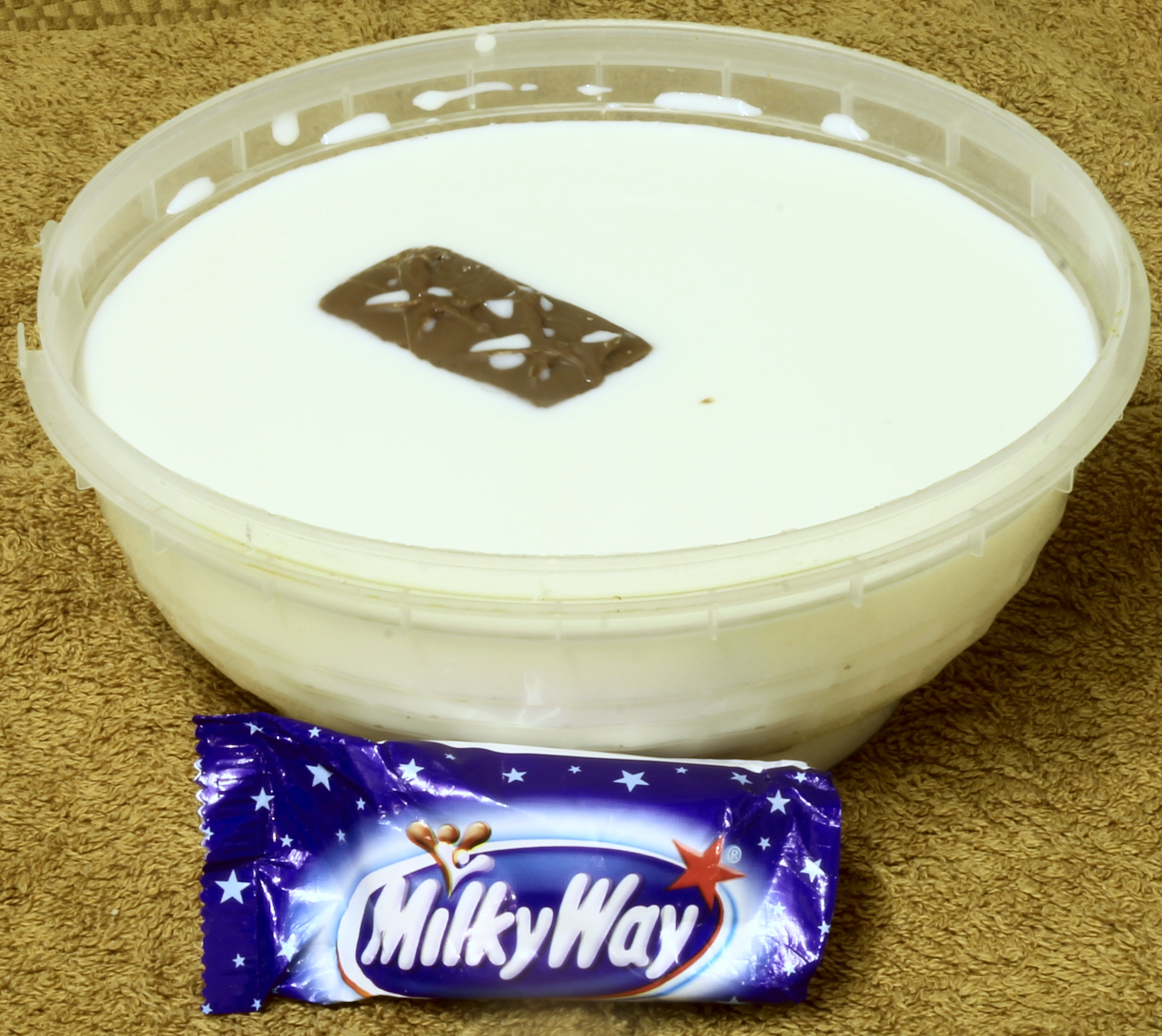
The fact that the chocolate bar floats in milk was highlighted by advertising campaigns in several European countries.

A long-running advertising slogan for the product in the United Kingdom and Australia was, "The sweet you can eat between meals without ruining your appetite". In 1991, the British Health Education Authority and anti-sugar lobbyists both complained, without success, to the Independent Television Commission that such advertising encouraged children to eat sweets between meals. The ITC agreed with Mars that its advertisements in fact encouraged restrained eating.

Once marketed as a snack food that would not intrude on regular meals, modern marketing portrays the Milky Way as a snack reducing mealtime hunger and curbing the appetite between meals.

A widely known jingle advertisement was debuted in 1989, featuring a red 1951 Buick Roadmaster and a vehicle that resembles a blue 1959 Cadillac Series 62 (lacking its dual headlights) racing, with the former eating everything in sight and the latter eating a Milky Way. The advertisement ends with the bridge to Dinnertown being out and the now fat red car being too heavy to jump the gap while the blue car makes the jump. The advertisement returned albeit edited in 2009, removing the claim that the Milky Way is not an appetite spoiler.

== See also ==
- List of chocolate bar brands
