= 3 Musketeers (chocolate bar) =

North American candy bar by Mars, Inc.

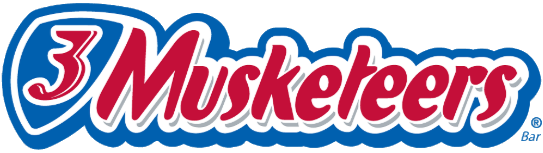

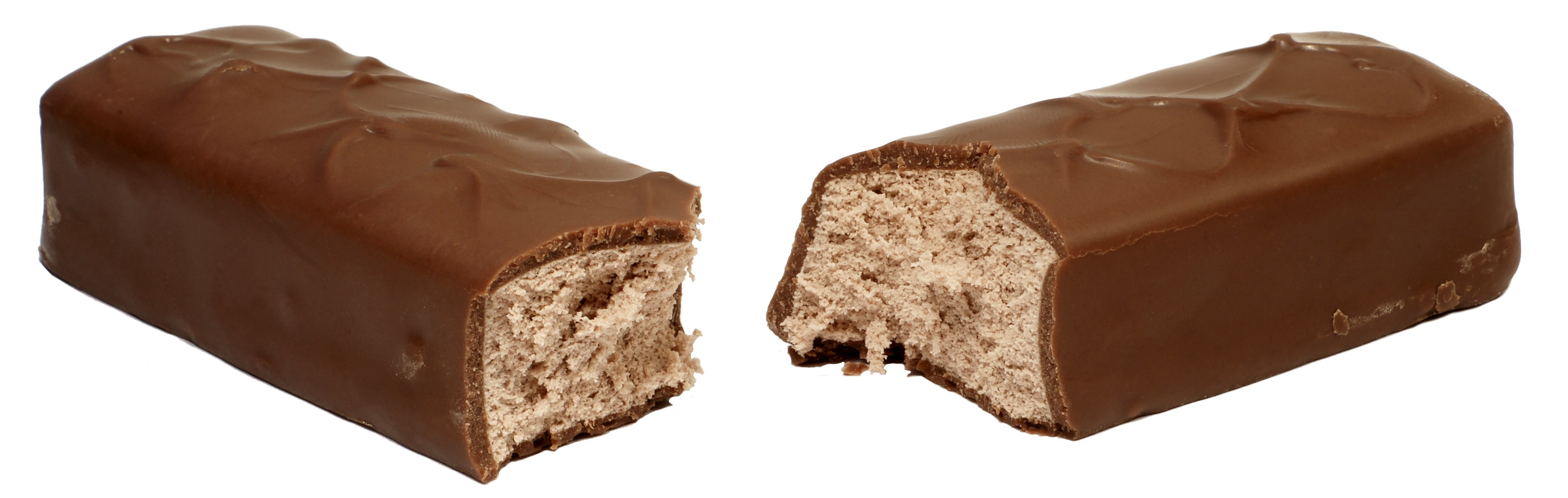
- Product type: Confectionery
- Current owner: Mars, Incorporated
- Country: United States
- Introduced: 1932; 94 years ago
- Related brands: Milky Way
- Website: 3musketeers.com

3 Musketeers is a candy bar made in the United States and Canada by Mars, Incorporated. It is a candy bar consisting of chocolate-covered, fluffy, whipped nougat. It is similar to the global Milky Way bar as well as the American version of the Milky Way bar (only without the latter's caramel topping).

== History ==
Introduced in 1932, 3 Musketeers was the third brand produced and manufactured by Mars. Each 3 Musketeers package contained three flavors, chocolate, strawberry and vanilla, hence the name, which was derived from the 1844 novel The Three Musketeers by Alexandre Dumas. Due to rising costs and wartime restrictions on sugar, the vanilla and strawberry pieces were phased out leaving only the popular chocolate piece. The bars cost five cents when they were introduced, and they were marketed as one of the largest chocolate bars available.

To mark the 75th anniversary of the introduction of the candy bar, Mars introduced 3 Musketeers Mint, the first brand extension, in August 2007. Also in 2007, Mars produced a limited-edition "Autumn Minis Mix" 3 Musketeers. It featured French Vanilla, Mocha Cappuccino and Strawberry. This was followed by Cherry 3 Musketeers for 2008, and Raspberry 3 Musketeers and Orange 3 Musketeers for Easter 2008. Orange was coated in milk chocolate, while the cherry and raspberry were coated with dark chocolate. In 2019, Mars released their latest flavor, the 3 Musketeers Birthday Cake.

== Manufacturing ==
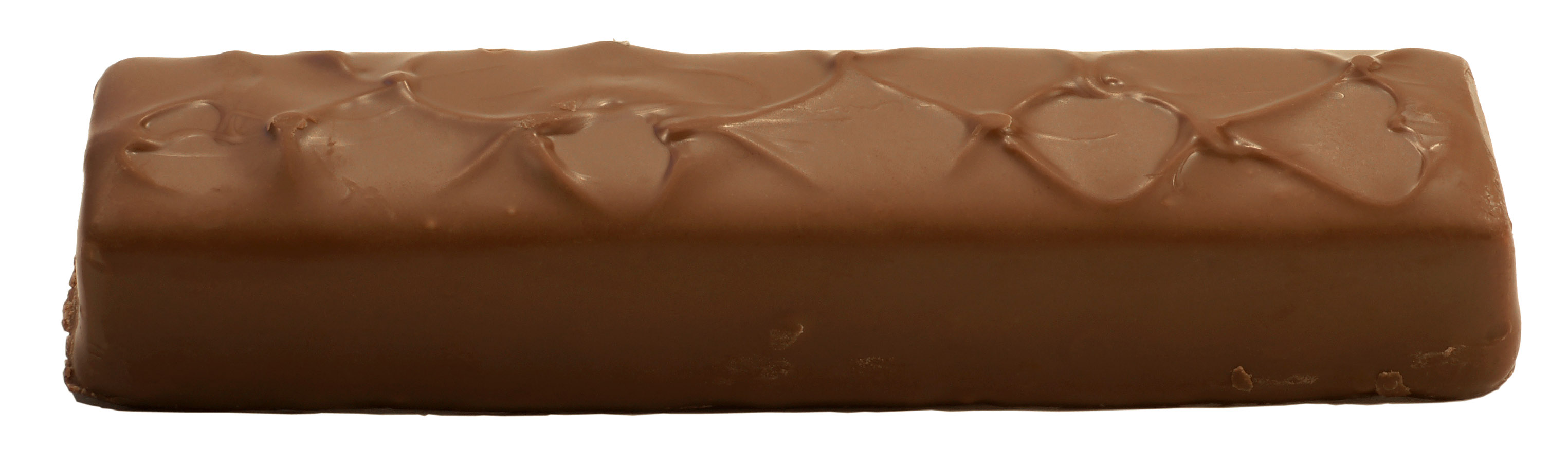
3 Musketeers out of the wrapper

The candy is made of a whipped nougat mousse formed into large slabs, which are cut to size and enrobed in milk chocolate. The nougat chocolate center is made by whipping egg whites until they are light and frothy. Sugar syrup is then added, stabilizing the foam and creating mousse. Other flavoring ingredients are then added to the mousse to create specific flavors.

The candy is made in Chicago, Illinois; Elizabethtown, Pennsylvania; and Newmarket, Ontario.

== Marketing ==
3 Musketeers was advertised on television on the 1950s-era Howdy Doody show, along with a song that Buffalo Bob Smith encouraged children to sing.

In 1998, the bar's advertisements featured three men dressed as the legendary Three Musketeers to market the "45% less fat" campaign. The advertising campaign was developed by Will Vinton Studios, whose previous works include the M&M's characters, The Noid and The California Raisins. The product's original slogan of "Big on Chocolate!" was expanded in these advertisements to "Big on Chocolate, Not on Fat!"

In 2015, Mars, Incorporated debuted a marketing campaign in the form of a YouTube channel. The campaign was developed and directed by the advertising agency Tribal Worldwide, who explained the project as an effort to establish relevancy and recognition among Generation Z. The campaign has encountered mixed reception. Many marketing insiders have described the campaign as an example of influencer marketing, whereby personalities or "influencers" are able to more effectively advertise to an audience that trusts them than an expensive corporate advertising campaign.

A common misconception regarding the Three Musketeers bar and Milky Way bar is that on release the two candies had their respective labels swapped in manufacturing. The explanation given is that the Milky Way bar's three ingredients in the US (chocolate, nougat, and caramel) were originally meant to represent the three musketeers. However the Milky Way bar was released in the US in 1924, and the 3 Musketeers bar was released in the US in 1932, disproving this urban myth.

== Nutritional information ==
A standard-size 3 Musketeers bar (60 g) has 257 kilocalories (1,080 kilojoules) of food energy, 7 grams of total fat, and 40 grams of sugar, while the mini-size bar (serving size 41 g) has 179 kilocalories (750 kilojoules), 5 grams of total fat, and 27 grams of sugar.

== Flavor list ==
- Original 3 bar-Chocolate (chocolate, vanilla, strawberry), 1932–1945
- Chocolate with filling, 1945–present
- Mint, 2007
- "Autumn Minis" – Cappuccino, French Vanilla and Strawberry, 2007
- Cherry, 2008
- Raspberry, 2008
- Orange, 2008
- Chocolate Strawberry Brownie, 2008
- Chocolate Brownie Bar (Generation Max series)
- S'Mores Brownie Bar (Generation Max series)
- Truffle Crisp
- Marshmallow, limited edition Minis, Easter 2011 and 2012
- Coconut, 2011
- Hot Chocolate with marshmallow, Christmas 2012
- Birthday Cake, 2019

== See also ==
- Milky Way (chocolate bar), the European equivalent
- List of chocolate bar brands
