= Gianduja =

Gianduja may refer to:

- Gianduja (commedia dell'arte), a mask which represents Turin and Piedmont in general
- Gianduja (chocolate), a preparation of chocolate with hazelnut paste

== See also ==
- Gianduiotto, a Piedmontese chocolate whose shape resembles an upturned boat
