= Cremino =

Italian layered chocolate

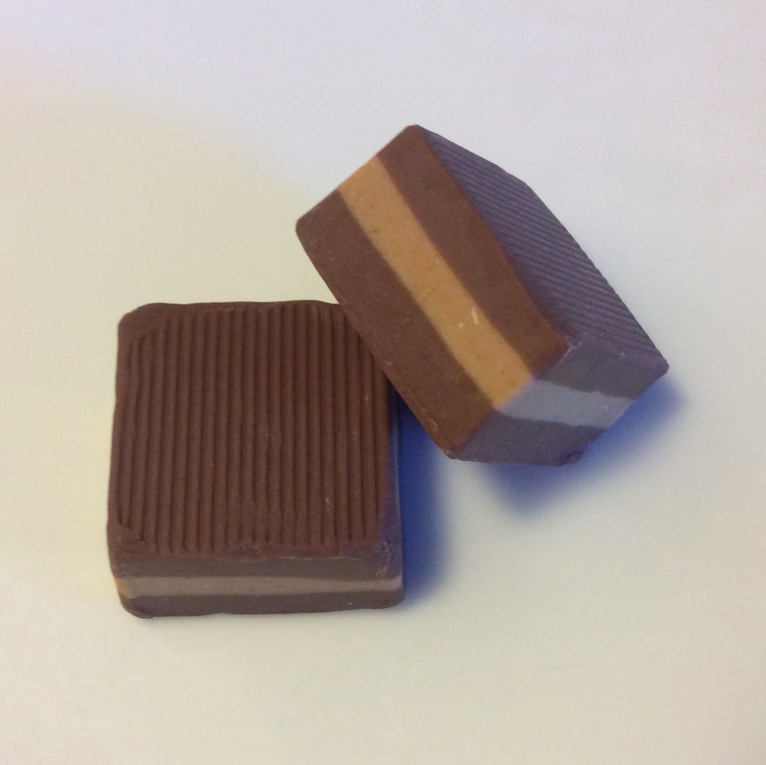
- Cremino with hazelnut filling (Feletti)
- Type: Chocolate
- Place of origin: Italy
- Region or state: Piedmont
- Created by: Ferdinando Baratti
- Main ingredients: Gianduja with hazelnut or almond filling

The cremino is a chocolate originating in the Piedmont region of Italy. It is composed of three layers; the outer layers are made with gianduja chocolate, and the inner one can be made with either coffee, lemon or hazelnut paste. It is typically cubical and is sold wrapped in aluminum and a paper band which indicates the flavour.

== History ==
This chocolate was created in the first half of the 19th century by Ferdinando Baratti who, with his associate Edoardo Milano in a laboratory in Turin (the future caffe Baratti & Milano), produced liquors and sweets. However, the first documentation about cremino are from 1934.

Nowadays, Italian producers of cremino include Caffarel, Feletti, Majani, Venchi, San Carlo, and Pernigotti.

== Fiat ==
In 1911, the Italian car manufacturer Fiat launched a contest for Italian chocolate makers to create a new chocolate for publicising their Tipo 4. The contest was won by Majani, the first Italian chocolate producer established in 1796 in Bologna, who created a new cremino with four layers instead of three; two layers were made with gianduja, and the other two with almond paste.

== See also ==
- List of Italian desserts and pastries
- Marroc
