= Pernigotti =

Italian confectionery company

- Type: Private
- Industry: Food
- Founded: 1868; 158 years ago
- Founder: Stefano Giuseppe Pernigotti, Francesco Pernigotti
- Headquarters: Novi Ligure, Piedmont, Italy
- Key people: Paolo Pernigotti, Stefano Pernigotti
- Products: Chocolates, gianduiotto, nougats, easter eggs, ice creams
- Parent: JP Morgan Asset Management; Invitalia (25%)
- Website: Pernigotti Spa

Pernigotti is an Italian manufacturer of chocolate (its speciality is the production of high quality Gianduiotto, a chocolate-hazelnut based confectionery), nougats, Easter eggs and ice creams. It is one of the oldest and most traditional manufacturers of chocolate and nougat candy in Italy. Originally founded in 1860 in the town of Novi Ligure, Piedmont, it was sold in 2013 to the Toksöz company of Istanbul. Since 2022, it has been acquired by JP Morgan Asset Management. While in July 2023, Invitalia will also enter the share capital with 25%.
It has been said that for Italians, "Pernigotti is to chocolate as Ferrari is to cars."

== History ==
Founded in 1860 as a grocery shop, the company was owned by the Pernigotti family for five generations, until 1995. By 1882, its quality was sufficiently well known that King Umberto I granted the company the privilege of using the royal coat of arms on the factory insignia on 25 April 1882.

In 1914 with the First World War at the gates, the Italian government forbids the use of sugar for the preparation of confectionery products, including nougat: what could represent an obstacle to production, is transformed, because of the intuition by Francesco Pernigotti, in an innovation that enriches the quality of the company. The absence of sugar, in fact, is filled by a greater concentration of honey, giving life to a new nougat with a unique consistency.

In 1919, Paolo Pernigotti replaced his father Francesco at the helm of the company.

At the end of World War II, its main production plant was destroyed when it moved its headquarters to the current factory in central Novi Ligure.

Pernigotti's most famous brands include Gianduiotto, the production of which began in 1927, and Cremino, Pepitas and Nocciolato.

In 1980 comes a period of crisis that will lead to the sale of Sperlari in 1981 to the Americans of the H.J. Heinz Company.

In 1995 Stefano Pernigotti, left without heirs after the death of his two very young children, Paolo, 17 age, and Lorenzo, 13 age, in a road accident in Uruguay on 10 July 1980, decides to sell Pernigotti to the Averna family, known for the successes linked to the alcoholic beverages sector. In 2000 he also left Streglio to a niece.

On 11 July 2013 the company was sold by the Averna family to the Turkish group belonging to the Toksöz family, active in the confectionery, pharmaceutical and energy sectors.

On 1 October 2019, Pernigotti announced they had sold their "Ice & Pastry" branch to Optima Group. As part of the transaction Optima acquired the "Pernigotti Maestri Gelatieri Italiani" brand.

On 11 August 2020, Stefano Pernigotti dies at the age of 98.

In 2022 the Toksoz group sells the entire shareholding of Pernigotti to JP Morgan Asset Management. In July 2023, Invitalia entered the share capital of Pernigotti as a minority shareholder with a 25% stake.

== Production ==
The enterprise also produces other chocolate products, nougats, easter eggs and "semilavorati" of ice cream (basic cream to make ice cream).

On 7 November 2018, Toksöz announced that Pernigotti would close its main production facility at Novi Ligure with the loss of 200 jobs. At the time, it was reported that Pernigotti had accumulated losses of €13 million over the previous five years. In the same period, turnover had dropped from €75 million to €50 million. Conflicting reports at the time suggested that Toksöz was planning to move production to Turkey, while others reported that Pernigotti planned to outsource production only within Italy. The closure has been cited as another example of the impact of Italy's approach to restructuring fundamentally viable companies who are in difficulty.

Since the acquisition of JP Morgan Asset Management, the production resumes at the historic Novi Ligure plant in 2022.
