= Marroc =

Confection

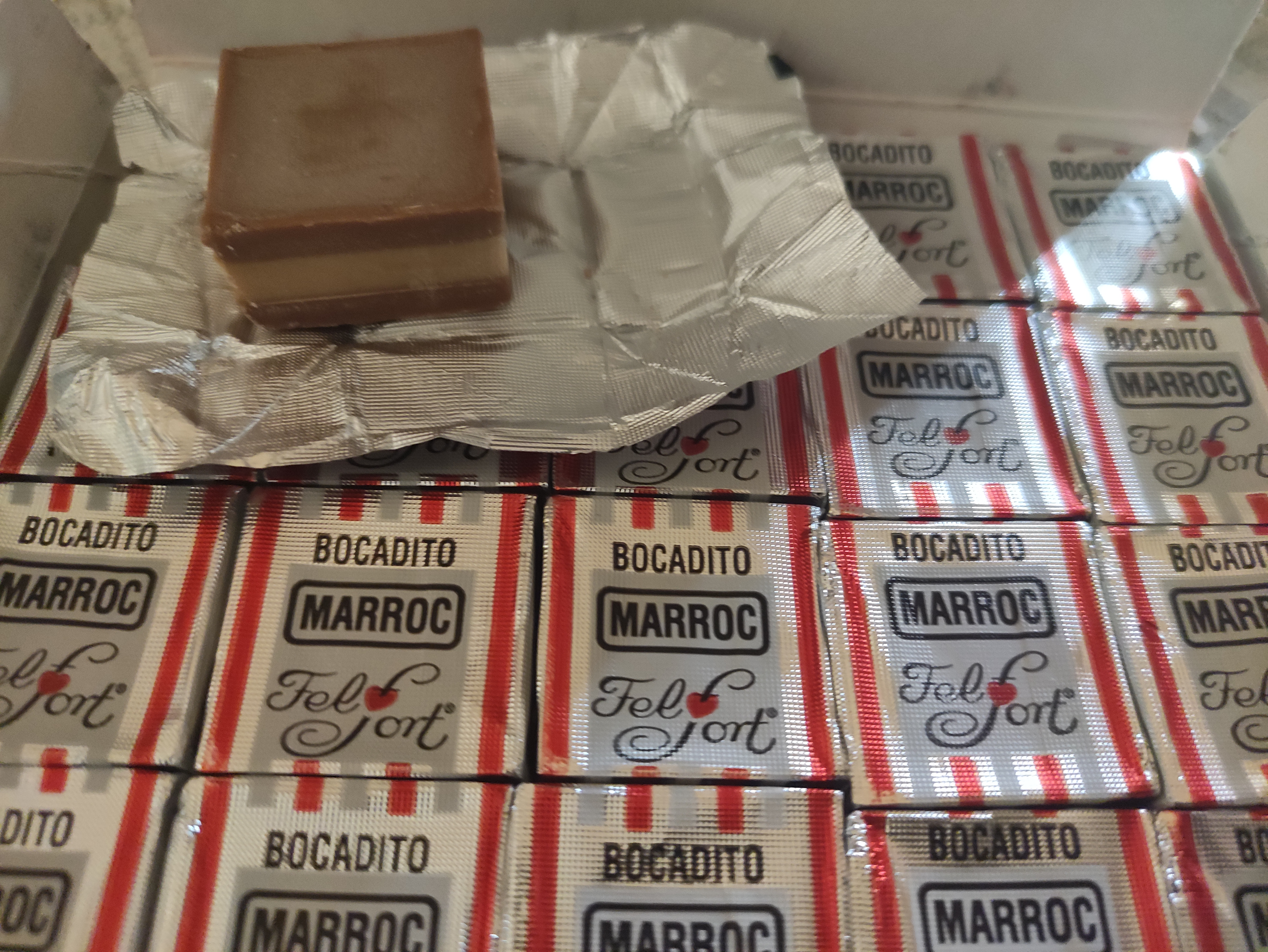
- Box of Marroc
- Type: Confectionery
- Place of origin: Argentina
- Main ingredients: Chocolate, peanut butter

Marroc is a confection mainly manufactured by the Argentine company Felfort.

== History ==
Its history dates back to 1927 when Moroccan immigrants, Hossam Maissar and his wife Malika, embarked to Argentina with the ingredients. Felipe Fort, who was already working on chocolate at that time, obtained the recipe from them and produced the layered praline confection, characterized by its combination of chocolate and peanut butter, and it became a classic of Argentine confectionery.

However, its manufacture is not exclusive to the Felfort company.

== See also ==
- Cremino
- Mantecol
- Nucrem
