= AMBAO =

Belgian certification mark for chocolate

AMBAO is a certification mark for chocolate created by the Belgian Ministry of Economic Affairs.

The mark certifies that the product has been made without any other vegetable fats other than cocoa fats, or any artificial additives. The AMBAO scheme was designed to resist the effects of the European Cocoa and Chocolate Directive, which allowed the use of up to 5% non-cocoa vegetable fats in chocolate.
