= Gianduja (chocolate) =

Confection made of chocolate and hazelnut

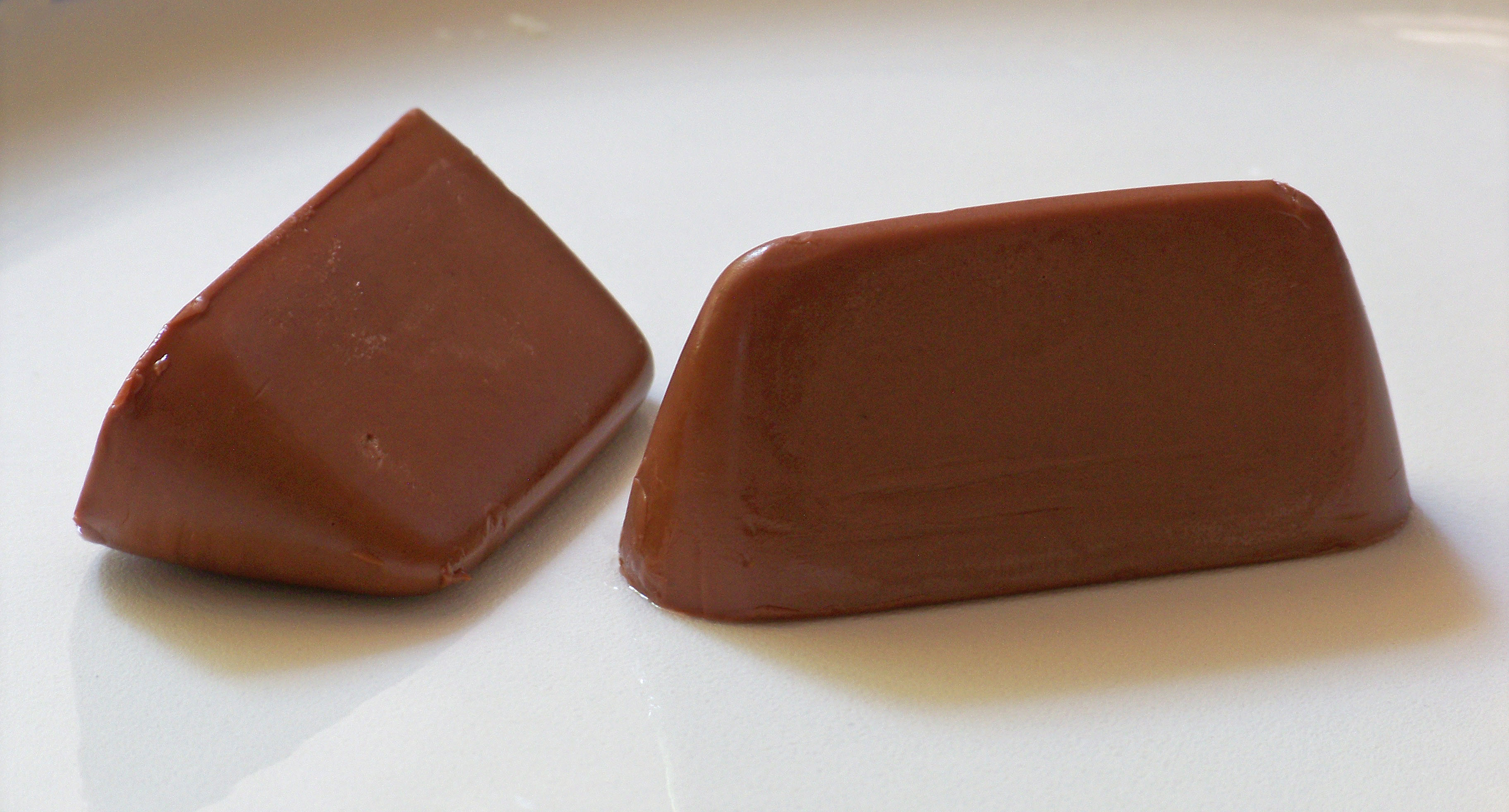
- Gianduja chocolates
- Alternative names: Gianduia
- Type: Chocolate
- Place of origin: Italy
- Region or state: Turin, Piedmont
- Main ingredients: Chocolate paste, hazelnut paste

Gianduja (Note: Pronounced /dʒænˈduːjə/ jan-DOO-yə, UK also /dʒænˈduːdʒə/ jan-DOO-jə, US also /dʒɑːnˈduːjə/ jahn-DOO-yə; Italian: [dʒanˈduːja]; Piedmontese: giandoja [dʒaŋˈdʊja].) or gianduia is a homogeneous blend of chocolate with 30% hazelnut paste, invented in Turin during Napoleon's regency (1796–1814). It can be consumed in the form of bars or as a filling for chocolates, but it is most notably sold in the form of gianduiotti.

Gianduja may be described as chocolate stretched with hazelnut butter. Similarly to standard chocolate, it is made in both plain and milk versions. It may also contain other nuts, such as almond. As a bar, gianduja resembles normal chocolate, except for the fact that it is softer due to the presence of hazelnut oil, which is liquid at room temperature unlike cocoa butter. However, like conventional chocolate, gianduja is usually tempered.

== History ==
The Continental System, imposed by Napoleon in 1806, prevented British goods from entering European ports under French control, putting a strain on cocoa supplies. It is unclear when gianduja bars were made for the first time. However, Kohler is generally credited for the addition of (whole) hazelnuts to chocolate bars in 1830. It is also known that, in 1852, Turin-based chocolate manufacturer Caffarel invented gianduiotto, which is a small ingot-shaped gianduja.

It takes its name from Gianduja, a Carnival and marionette character who represents the archetypal Piedmontese, natives of the Italian region where hazelnut confectionery is common. A textbook by Le Cordon Bleu writes this naming was an attempt to appeal to children.

The Italian jury reports of the 1878 Paris Universal Exhibition praised gianduiotti as among the finest chocolates produced in Italy, at a time when the country’s chocolate industry still lagged behind those of other European nations in terms of production. Manufacturers (all in Turin) included Caffarel, Talmone, Gay-Revel, and Moriondo. Gianduja also became popular outside Italy by the end of the 19th century, likely first in Switzerland and then throughout the rest of Europe.

== Production ==
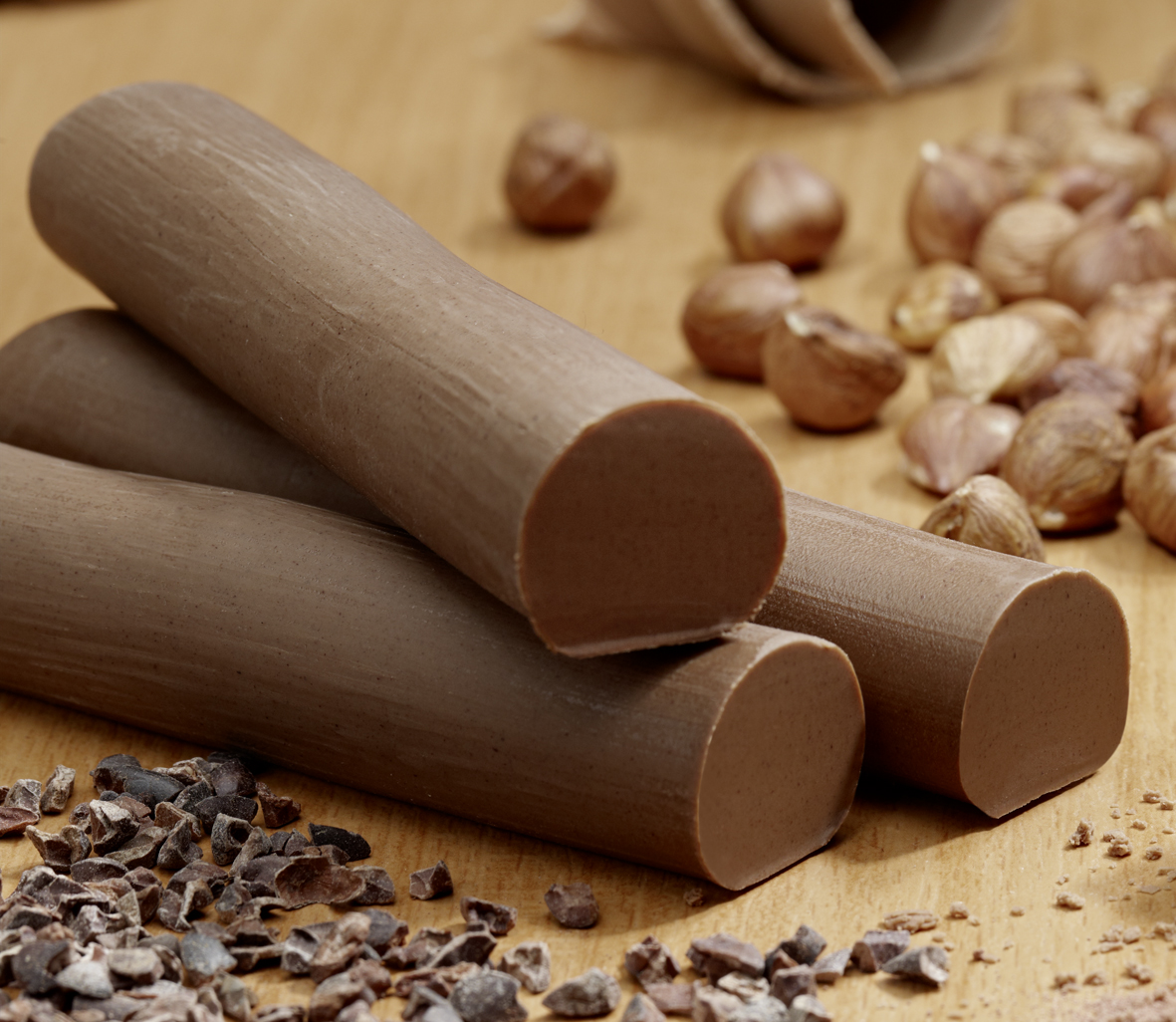
Gianduja bars

Gianduja is a simple blend of chocolate, powdered sugar, and finely ground nuts, generally hazelnuts. In gianduja made on an industrial scale, these nuts are almost always almonds and hazelnuts.

To begin, nuts are toasted to develop flavor and reduce moisture, as water can impact viscosity. In nuts intended for white chocolate gianduja, toasting is brief. While still hot, the nuts are then refined in a melanger or food processor until pieces are around the size of cocoa, leaving some small pieces to prevent the final gianduja being too soft. A food processor creates a less smooth product, but in domestic and some artisan production it is the most accessible option. During refining, oil is released from the nut's cells; the addition of some powdered sugar and the nuts residual heat increases the output.

This nut paste is then added to the melted chocolate with the rest of the powdered sugar. All chocolates—milk, white, and dark—are used to make gianduja. The ratio of chocolate to nuts determines the firmness of gianduja; using more chocolate creates a softer gianduja. In gianduja intended as a confection filling, the ratio of chocolate, sugar and nuts are around 1:1:1. Depending on the chocolate used, other ingredients may include lecithin, milk fats and vegetable fats. It can be made in about 30 minutes.

== Legal standards ==
International and national regulations govern what can be marketed as gianduja. International standards are laid out in the Codex Alimentarius. The standards require gianduja to be made from a chocolate that contains at least 32% dry cocoa solids, of which at least 8% is not cocoa butter, and "finely ground" hazelnut. This hazelnut must make up between 20–40% of the gianduja. The Codex also allows other ingredients to be added: up to 5% milk solids, and any nuts—whole or in pieces—so long as they make up less than 60% of the total weight.

A separate identity for gianduja milk chocolate is also defined, modifying the basic gianduja to require the chocolate contain more than 10% milk solids, and the "finely ground" hazelnut make up between 15–40%. Regulators adopting the Codex also have the authority to establish a minimum for cocoa butter and milk fat content. Given the Codex requirements, participating countries can choose to accept them in full or in a modified form. Participating countries include all members of the World Trade Organization, which, upon joining, are obliged to base their domestic standards on international agreements such as the Codex. In the European Union, gianduja's composition is regulated by the European Cocoa and Chocolate Directive, which passed in 2000; the standards are the same as those of the Codex.

== Related foods ==
Gianduja is similar to chocolate praline, with the distinction that in chocolate praline, nuts are roasted further and sugar is caramelized. Also close to gianduja is the eggless German nougat.

Chocolate hazelnut spreads are also inspired from gianduja. They tend to use cocoa powder and vegetable oils rather than cocoa butter-based chocolate. Nutella was originally called "Pasta Gianduja" ('Gianduja Paste').

== See also ==
Media related to Gianduia at Wikimedia Commons

- List of Italian desserts and pastries
- Cremino – a gianduja specialty
