= Caffarel =

Italian chocolate company

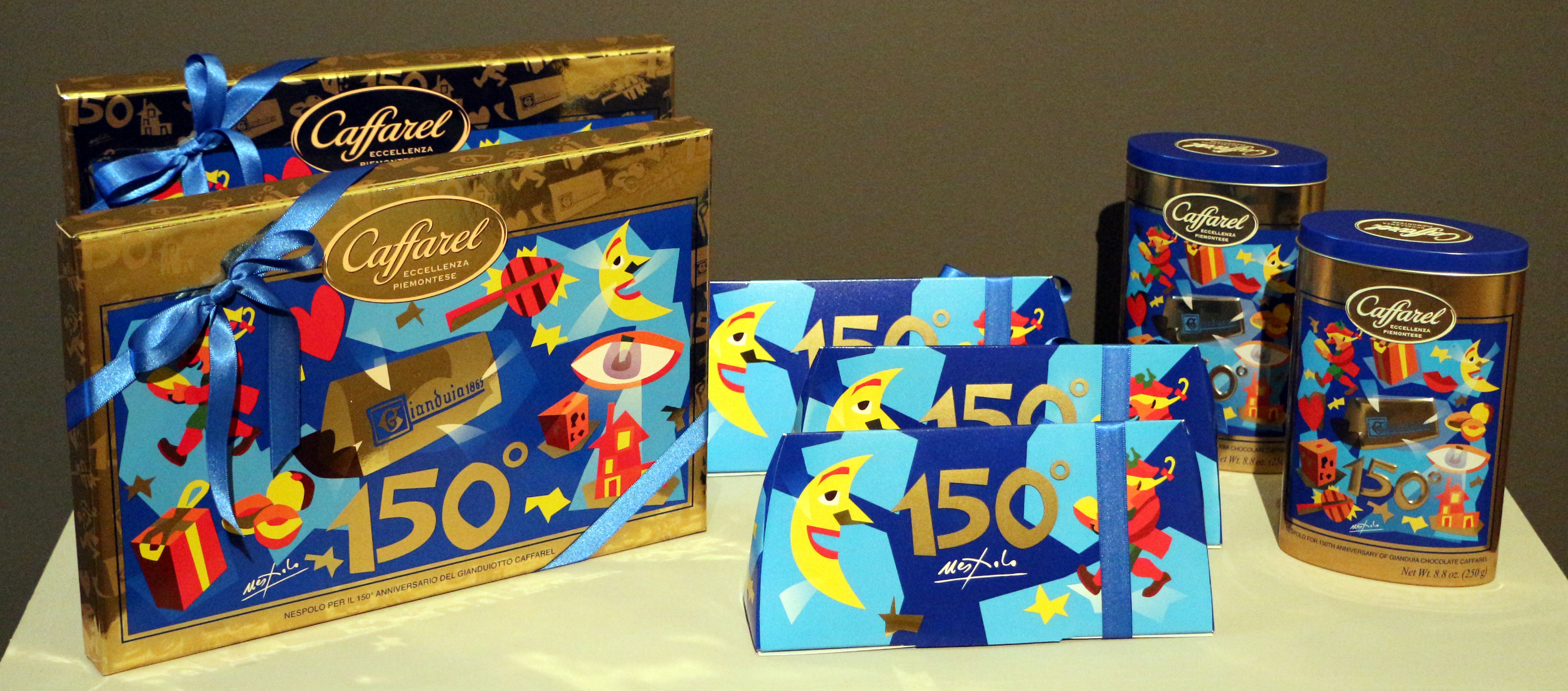
Chocolate boxes by Caffarel

Caffarel is a chocolate-manufacturing company based in Luserna San Giovanni, Italy, which is a subsidiary of Lindt & Sprüngli. The company was founded in Turin during the 19th century. According to the company, it was founded in 1826 when Pierre Paul Caffarel (1801–1871) converted an ex-tannery into a chocolate factory and invented Gianduiotto in 1852.

In 1826 Caffarel purchased a revolutionary industrial machine, invented by Bozelli of Genoa, which was able to produce more than 300 kilos a day (a record then). Thanks to this machine, he established the first company to sell large quantities of solid chocolate. The second commercial success was Gianduja. In 1852 Caffarel introduced a new type of chocolate made by mixing cocoa, sugar and Tonda Gentile delle Langhe hazelnuts (renowned for their taste). In 1865 he began producing this unique specialty.

An alternative account is that chocolate production on the site was started by Giovanni Martino Bianchini, a chocolatier from Ticino, who had invented a water-powered machine for the production of chocolate, and the factory was purchased by Paul Caffarel on May 1, 1832. Caffarel was the only producer of chocolate using mechanisation in Turin until 1851, and later became Caffarel Prochet & Co. when Michele Prochet joined the company. However it is unlikely that Prochet invented gianduia paste in 1852, as is often stated, since he would have been 13 years old in that year. The company's ties with the Caffarel family ended by 1897, and Prochet died in 1904. The company changed hands more than once in the early 20th century, in one case following its bankruptcy. There were multiple claims as to the originator of gianduia, and insufficient evidence to confirm any of them conclusively, nor the date of the invention.
