= European Cocoa and Chocolate Directive =

European Union food law

The European Parliament and Council Directive 2000/36/EC is an EU Directive relating to cocoa and chocolate products. Most notably, this directive allows chocolate to contain up to 5% non-cocoa vegetable fats.

The Belgian Ministry of Economic Affairs has attempted to resist the effects of this directive by introducing the AMBAO certification scheme, which certifies that chocolate carrying the AMBAO mark is produced without vegetable fat substitution.
