= Gianduiotto =

Northern Italian chocolate confectionary

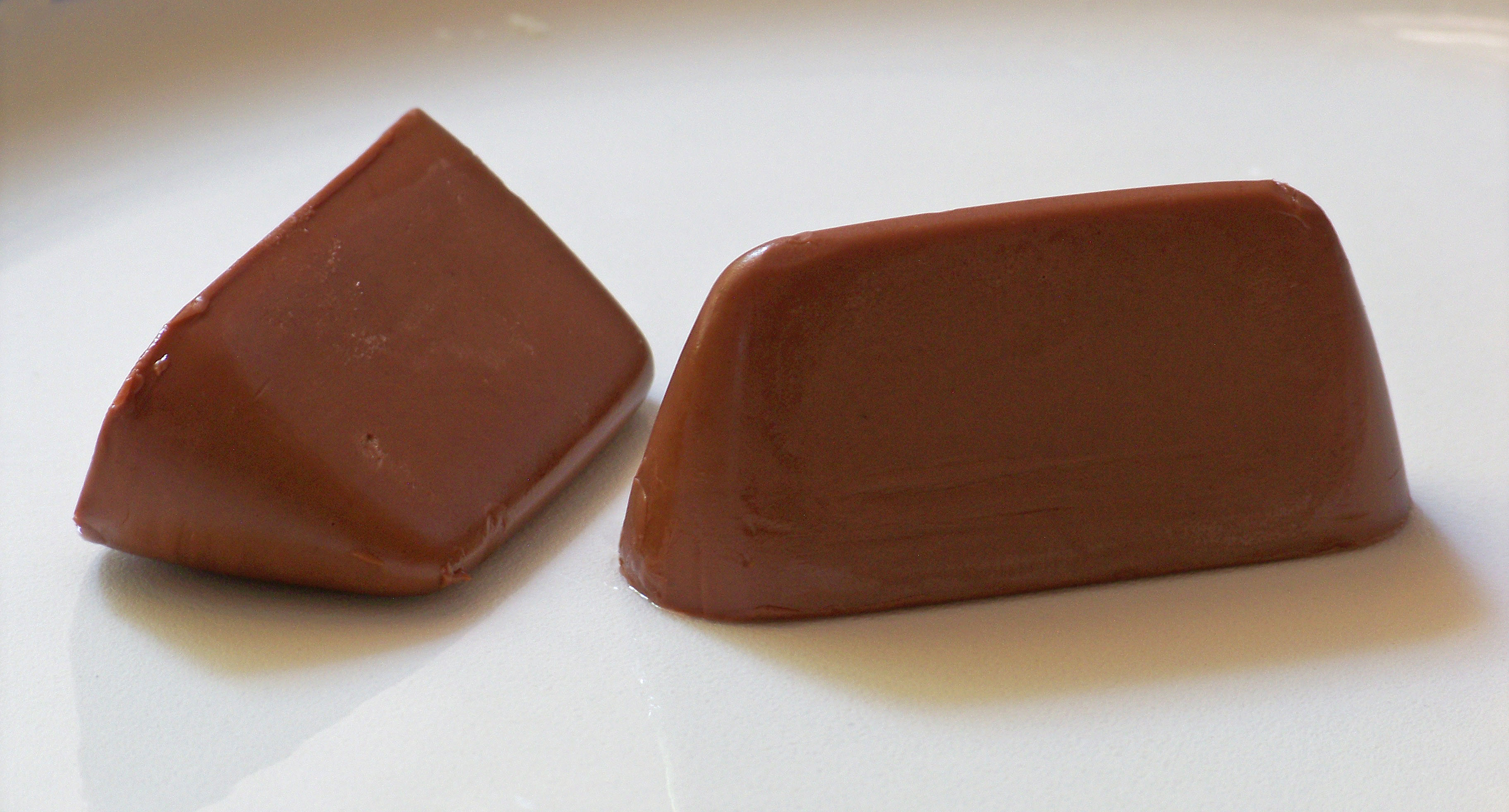
- Two gianduiotti
- Type: Chocolate
- Place of origin: Italy
- Region or state: Turin and Novi Ligure, Piedmont
- Main ingredients: Gianduja (sugar, chocolate, hazelnuts)

Gianduiotto (Italian: [dʒanduˈjɔtto]; Piedmontese: giandojòt [dʒaŋdʊˈjɔt]) is a chocolate originating in the Piedmont region of Italy. Gianduiotti are shaped like ingots and individually wrapped in a (usually) gold- or silver-colored foil cover. They are a specialty of Turin, and take their name from gianduja, the blend of chocolate and hazelnut used for gianduiotti and other sweets, including Nutella. This blend itself is named after Gianduja, a mask in commedia dell'arte, a type of Italian theater, that represents the Piemonte. Gianduja's tricorner hat inspired the shape of the gianduiotto.

Gianduiotti are produced from a paste of sugar, cocoa and hazelnut Tonda Gentile delle Langhe. The official "birth" of gianduiotti was in 1852 in Turin, by Pierre Paul Caffarel and Michele Prochet, the first to grind hazelnuts into a paste before adding them to the cocoa and sugar mix.

Mixing hazelnut into "standard" chocolates began at an industrial scale in response to Britain's blockade of Napoleonic France and its allies in the early 19th century, which greatly limited Italian access to South American cocoa. With the high prices of raw cocoa, Turin's chocolate makers started incorporating bits of roasted hazelnuts, which were locally grown and readily available in Piedmont, to make the final product more affordable.

== See also ==
Media related to Gianduiotto at Wikimedia Commons

- List of Italian desserts and pastries
- Gianduja
- Gianduja
