= Gianduja (commedia dell'arte) =

Character in Italian puppet theatre

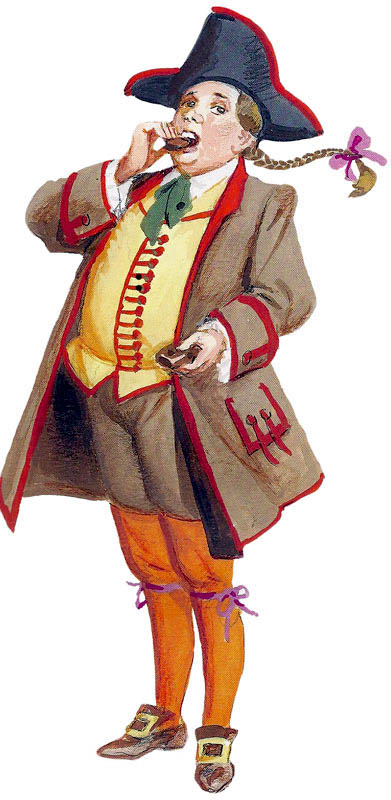
Gianduja, as depicted in a 19th-century print

Gianduja (Italian: [dʒanˈduːja]; Piedmontese: Giandoja [dʒaŋˈdʊja]) is one of the masks of the Italian commedia dell'arte, typically representing a kind, honest and jovial man from the Piedmontese countryside (and specifically, Turin).

== Origins ==
His name is said to derive from "Gioan d'la douja" or "John of the jug" in Piedmontese language, referring to his love of wine. Alternative explanations suggest that it is derived from the French "Jean Andouille" (John Sausage).

His wife is named Giacometta and their children are referred to as Giandujotti. Originally conceived as a simple farmer, over time Gianduja has evolved into a gentleman with a taste for good wine and gastronomy.

Gianduja was created as a glove puppet in Caglianetto d'Asti, Piedmont, in 1808. The character then appeared as a marionette in Turin in 1843.

== Depiction ==
The costume for Gianduja is a heavy brown jacket with red trim, a yellow waistcoat, and green breeches. He has a tricorne (three-cornered hat) on his wig or hair, typically wearing a ponytail.

== Cultural influence ==
Gianduja also became the namesake for a Piedmontese chocolate preparation.

== See also ==
- Gianduja
- Gianduiotto
