= Chocolate =

Food produced from cacao seeds

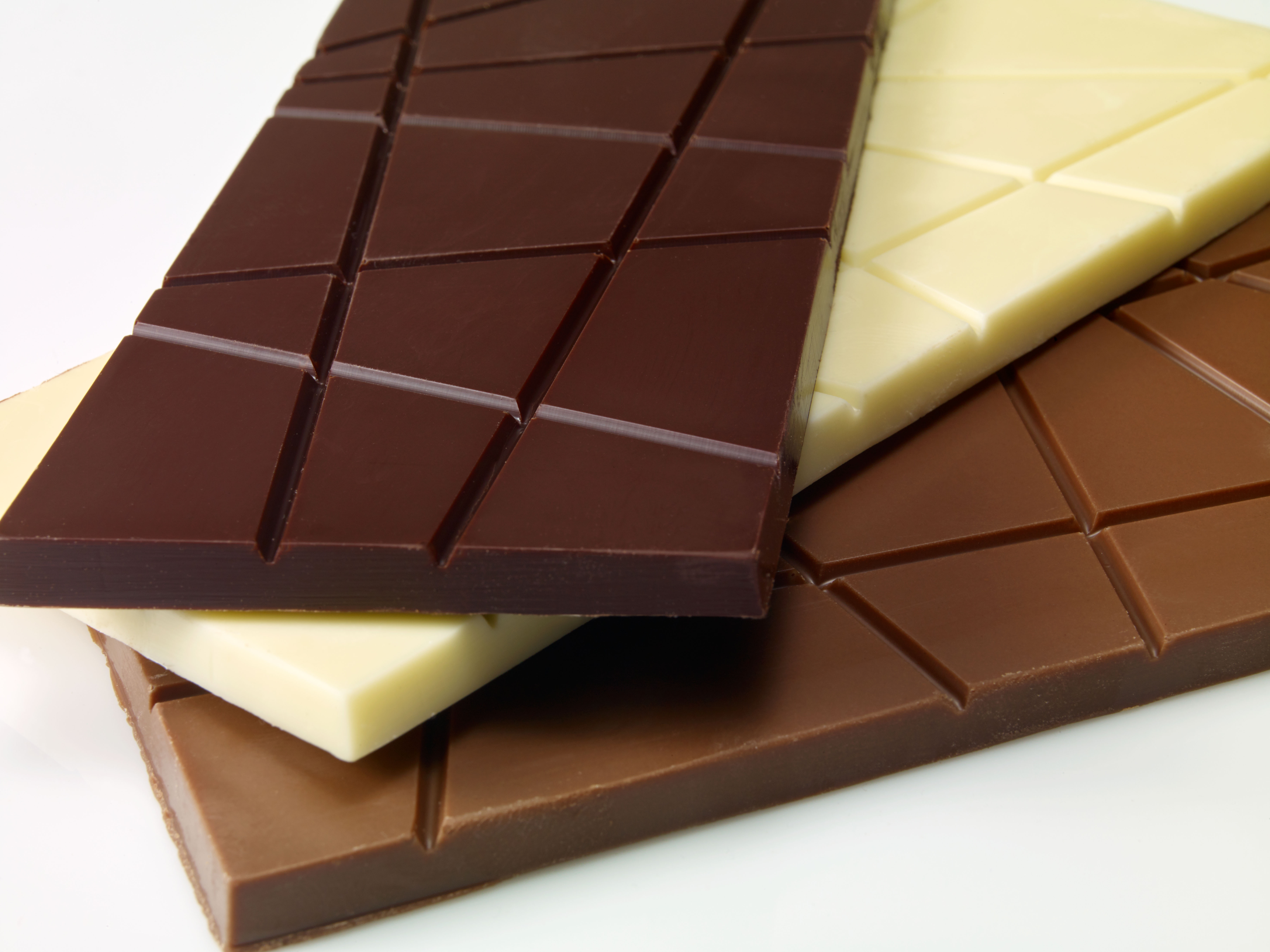
Chocolate bars in dark, white, and milk variants (top to bottom).

Chocolate is a food made from roasted and ground cocoa beans. It can be a liquid, solid, or paste. It is eaten on its own and used to flavor other foods.

Cocoa beans are the processed seeds of the cacao tree (Theobroma cacao). They are usually fermented to develop the flavor, then dried, cleaned, and roasted. The shell is removed to reveal nibs, which are ground to chocolate liquor (unadulterated chocolate in rough form.) The liquor can be further processed into cocoa butter and cocoa powder, or shaped and sold as unsweetened baking chocolate. By adding sugar, sweetened chocolates are produced, which can be sold simply as dark chocolate, or, with the addition of milk, can be made into milk chocolate. Making chocolate with only cocoa butter and milk produces white chocolate.

Chocolate is one of the most popular food types and flavors in the world, and many foodstuffs include chocolate, particularly desserts, including ice creams, cakes, mousse, and cookies. Many candies are filled with or coated with sweetened chocolate. Chocolate bars, either made of solid chocolate or other ingredients coated in chocolate, are eaten as snacks. Gifts of chocolate molded into different shapes (such as eggs, hearts, and coins) are traditional on certain holidays, including Christmas, Easter, Valentine's Day, Hanukkah and Eid al-Fitr. Chocolate is also used in cold and hot beverages, such as chocolate milk, hot chocolate and chocolate liqueur.

The cacao tree was first used as a source for food in what is today Ecuador at least 5,300 years ago. Mesoamerican civilizations widely consumed cacao beverages, and in the 16th century, one of these beverages, chocolate, was introduced to Europe. Until the 19th century, chocolate was a drink consumed by societal elite. In the wake of technological advances chocolate became a mass-consumed solid food. Cocoa beans for most chocolate are grown in West African countries, particularly Ivory Coast and Ghana, which contribute about 60% of the world's cocoa supply.

== Etymology ==
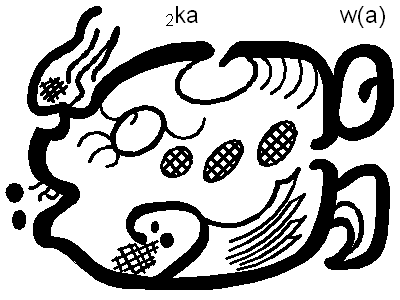
The Maya glyph for cacao

Chocolate is a Spanish loanword, first recorded in English in 1604, (Note: In: José de Acosta (1604). The naturall and morall historie of the East and West Indies. Vol. 1. Translated by Edward Grimeston (1st ed.). Edward Blount and William Aspley. The chiefe vse of this Cacao is in a drinke which they call Chocolate) and in Spanish in 1579. The word's origins beyond this are contentious. Despite a popular belief that chocolate derives from the Nahuatl word chocolatl, early texts documenting the Nahuatl word for chocolate drink use a different term, cacahuatl, meaning "cacao water". Several alternatives have therefore been proposed.

In one, chocolate is derived from the hypothetical Nahuatl word xocoatl, meaning "bitter drink". Scholars Michael and Sophie Coe consider this unlikely, saying that there is no clear reason why the 'sh' sound represented by 'x' would change to 'ch', or why an 'l' would be added. Another theory suggests that chocolate comes from chocolatl, meaning 'hot water' in a Mayan language. However, there is no evidence of the form 'chocol' being used to mean hot.

Despite the uncertainty about its Nahuatl origin, there is some agreement that chocolate likely derives from the Nawat word chikola:tl. Whether chikola:tl means 'cacao-beater', referring to whisking cocoa to create foam, is contested, as the meaning of chico is unknown. According to anthropologist Kathryn Sampeck, chocolate originally referred to one cacao beverage among many, which included annatto and was made in what is today Guatemala; Sampeck suggests that the word became the generic word for cacao beverages c. 1580, when the Izalcos from that area were the most notable producers of cacao.

== History ==
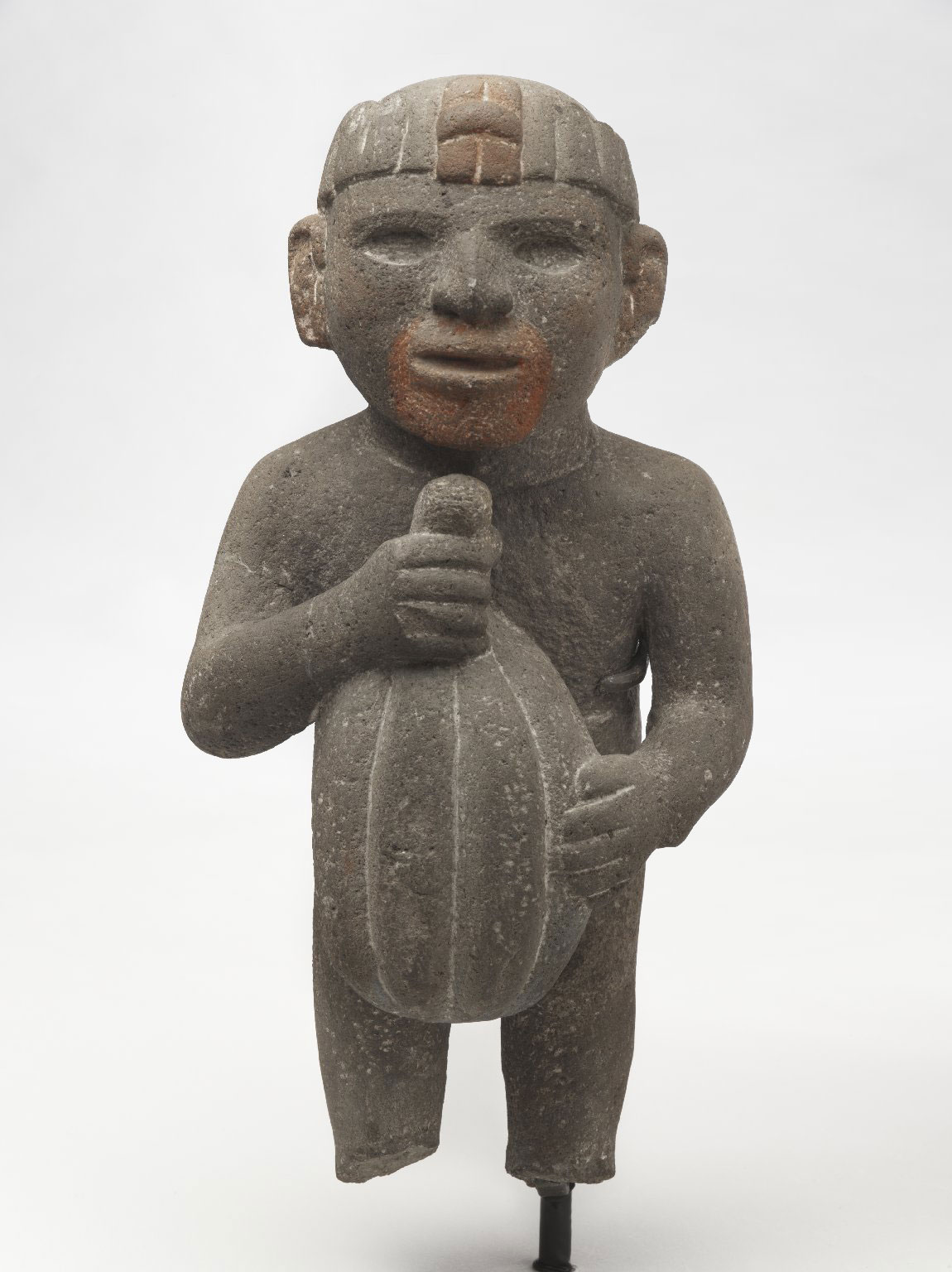
Mexica. Man Carrying a Cacao Pod, 1440–1521

The cacao tree was domesticated as early as 5300 BP in South America, in present-day southeast Ecuador, by the Mayo-Chinchipe culture, before it was introduced to Mesoamerica. It is unknown when chocolate was first consumed as opposed to other cacao-based drinks, and there is evidence the Olmecs, the earliest known major Mesoamerican civilization, fermented the sweet pulp surrounding the cacao beans into an alcoholic beverage.

Chocolate was extremely important to several Mesoamerican societies, and cacao was considered a gift from the gods by the Mayans and the Aztecs. The cocoa bean was used as a currency across civilizations and was used in ceremonies, as a tribute to leaders and gods and as a medicine. Chocolate in Mesoamerica was a bitter drink, flavored with additives such as vanilla, earflower and chili, and was capped with a dark brown foam created by pouring the liquid from a height between containers.

Spanish conquistador Hernán Cortés may have been the first European to encounter chocolate when he observed it in the court of Moctezuma II in 1520. It proved to be an acquired taste, and it took until 1585 for the first official recording of a shipment of cocoa beans to Europe. Chocolate was believed to be an aphrodisiac and medicine, and spread across Europe in the 17th century, sweetened, served warm and flavored with familiar spices. Religious orders played a significant role in its dissemination.

It was initially primarily consumed by the elite, with expensive cocoa supplied by colonial plantations in the Americas. In the 18th century, it was considered southern European, aristocratic and Catholic, and was still produced in a similar way to the way it had been produced by the Aztecs.

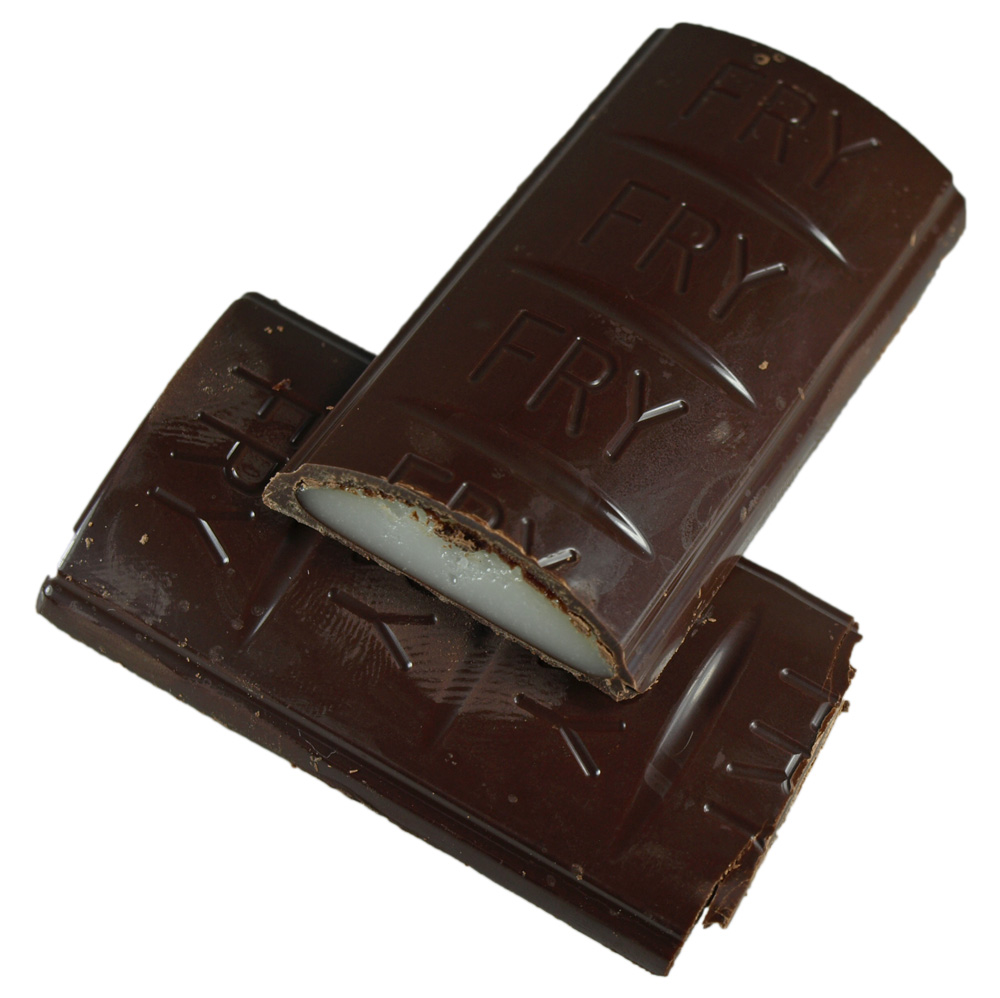
One of the first mass-produced chocolate bars, Fry's Chocolate Cream, was produced by Fry's in 1866.

Starting in the 18th century, chocolate production was improved. In the 19th century, engine-powered milling was developed. In 1828, Coenraad Johannes van Houten patented a hydraulic press that separated cocoa butter from chocolate liquor, enabling the mass production of defatted cocoa powder and creating the foundation for the modern solid chocolate industry. Other developments in the 19th century, including the melanger (a mixing machine), modern milk chocolate, the conching process to make chocolate smoother and change the flavor meant a worker in 1890 could produce fifty times more chocolate with the same labor than they could before the Industrial Revolution, and chocolate became a food to be eaten rather than drunk. As production moved from the Americas to Asia and Africa, mass markets in Western nations for chocolate opened up.

In the early 20th century, British chocolate producers including Cadbury and Fry's faced controversy over the labor conditions in the Portuguese cacao industry in Africa. A 1908 report by a Cadbury agent described conditions as "de facto slavery." While conditions somewhat improved with a boycott by chocolate makers, slave labor among African cacao growers again gained public attention in the early 21st century. In the 20th century, chocolate production further developed, with development of the tempering technique to improve the snap and gloss of chocolate and the addition of lecithin to improve texture and consistency. White and couverture chocolate were developed in the 20th century and the bean-to-bar trade model began.

== Types ==
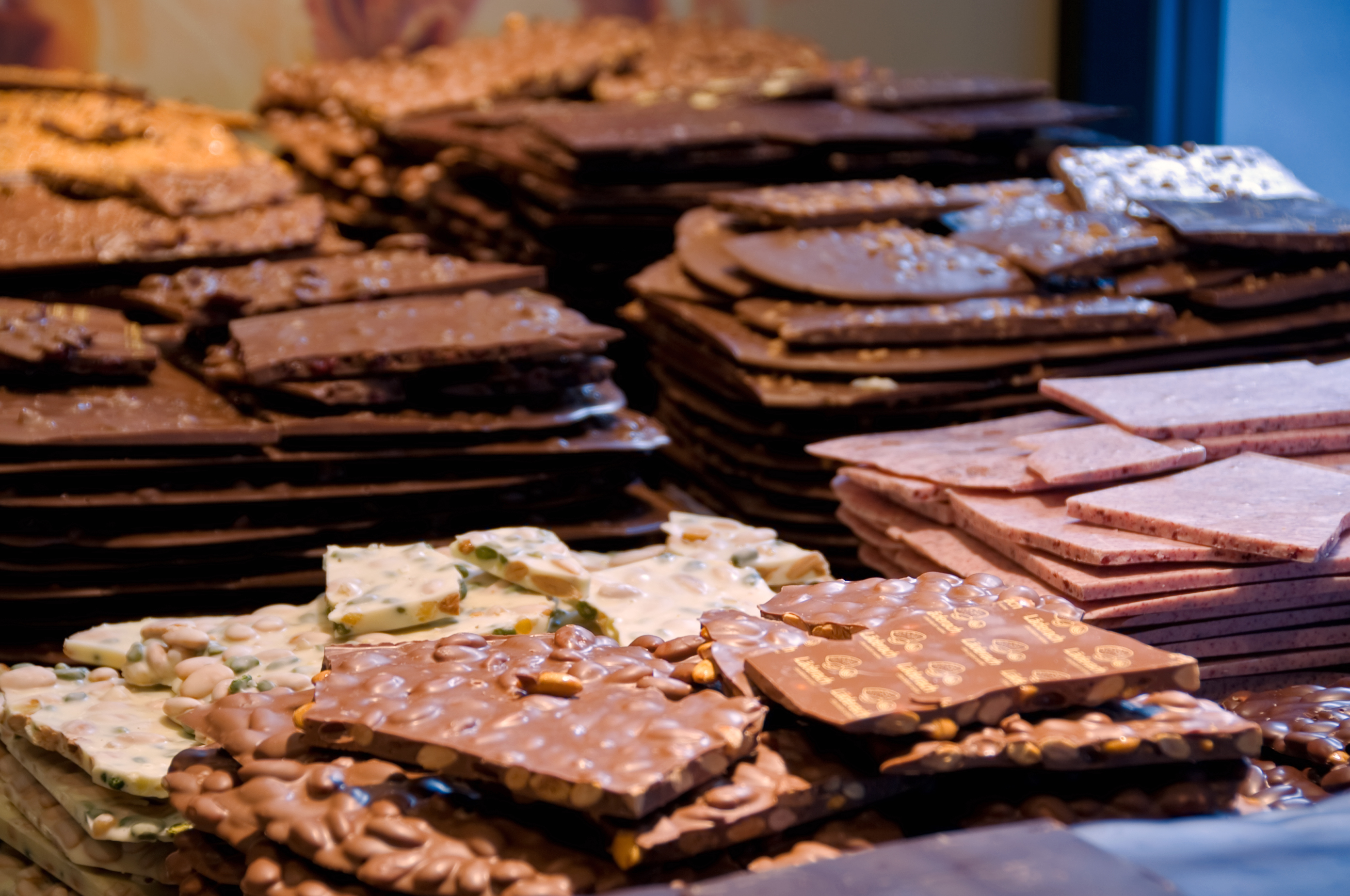
Barks made of different varieties of chocolate

Several types of chocolate can be distinguished. Pure, unsweetened chocolate, often called "baking chocolate", contains primarily non-fat cocoa solids and cocoa butter in varying proportions. Much of the chocolate consumed today is in the form of sweet chocolate, which combines chocolate with sugar.

=== Eating chocolate ===
The traditional types of chocolate are dark, milk and white. All of them contain cocoa butter, which is the ingredient defining the physical properties of chocolate (consistency and melting temperature). Plain (or dark) chocolate, as its name suggests, is a form of chocolate that is similar to pure cocoa liquor, although is usually made with a slightly higher proportion of cocoa butter. It is simply defined by its cocoa percentage. In milk chocolate, the non-fat cocoa solids are partly or mostly replaced by milk solids. In white chocolate, they are all replaced by milk solids, hence its ivory color.

Other forms of eating chocolate exist, these include raw chocolate (made with unroasted beans) and ruby chocolate. An additional popular form of eating chocolate, gianduja, is made by incorporating nut paste (typically hazelnut) to the chocolate paste.

=== Other types ===
Other types of chocolate are used in baking and confectionery. These include baking chocolate (often unsweetened), couverture chocolate (used for coating), compound chocolate (a lower-cost alternative) and modeling chocolate. Modeling chocolate is a chocolate paste made by melting chocolate and combining it with corn syrup, glucose syrup, or golden syrup.

== Cacao ==
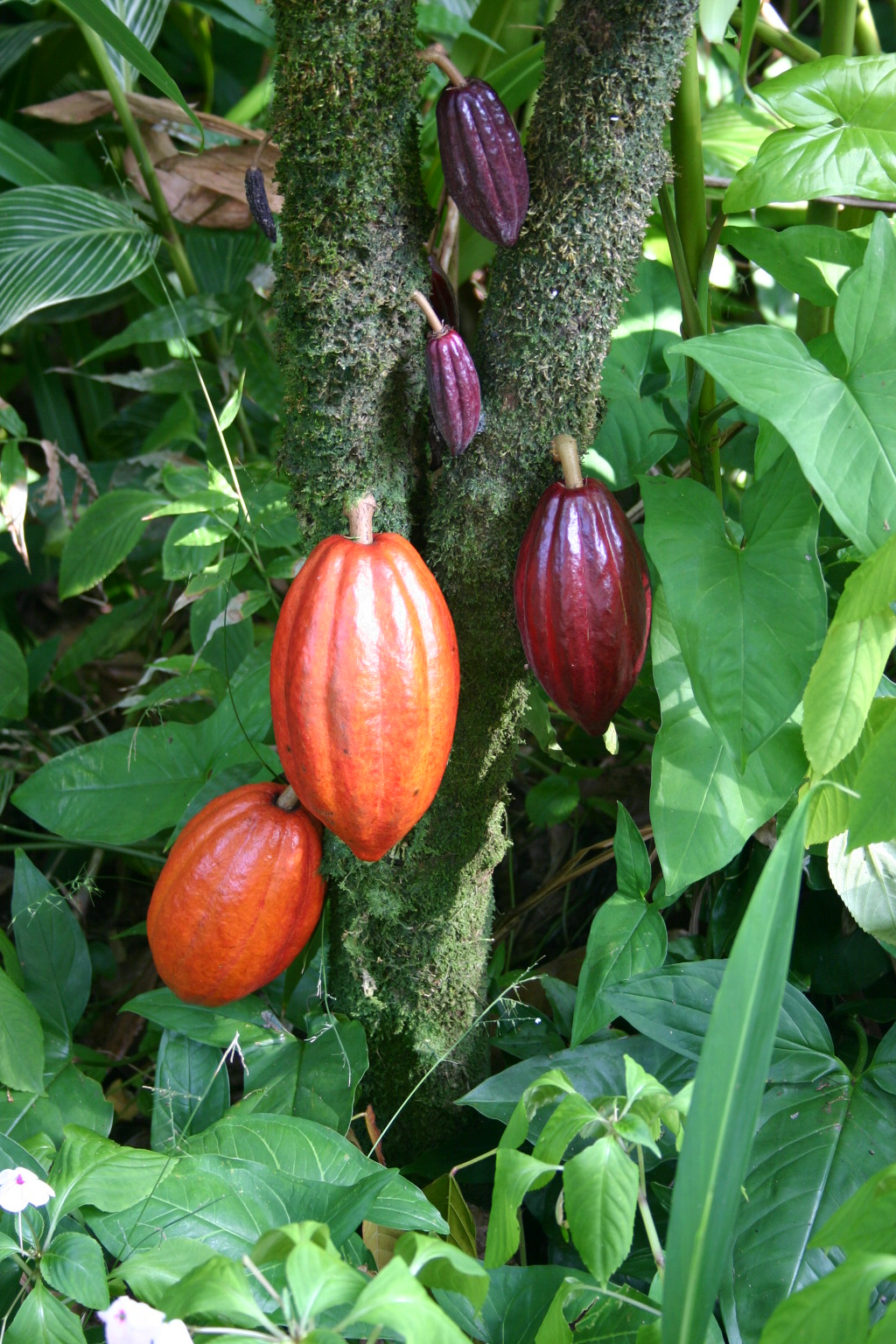
Chocolate is created from the cocoa bean. A cacao tree with fruit pods in various stages of ripening.

Chocolate is made from cocoa beans, the dried and often fermented seeds of the cacao tree (Theobroma cacao), a small, 4–8 m (13–26 ft) tall evergreen tree native to South America. The most common genotype originated in the Amazon basin, and was gradually transported by humans throughout South and Central America. Early forms of another genotype have also been found in what is now Venezuela.

The scientific name, Theobroma, means "food of the gods". The fruit, called a cocoa pod, is ovoid, 15–30 cm (6–12 in) long and 8–10 cm (3–4 in) wide, ripening yellow to orange, and weighing about 500 g (1.1 lb) when ripe.

Cacao trees are small, understory trees that need rich, well-drained soils. They naturally grow within 20° of either side of the equator because they need about 2000 mm of rainfall a year, and temperatures in the range of 21–32 °C (70–90 °F). Cacao trees cannot tolerate a temperature lower than 15 °C (59 °F). The genome of the cacao tree was sequenced in 2010.

Traditionally, cacao was understood to be divided into three varieties: Criollo, Forastero, and Trinitario. New genetic research has not found a genetic backing for this division, and it has identified eleven genetic clusters.

== Processing ==
Cocoa pods are harvested by cutting them from the tree using a machete, or by knocking them off the tree using a stick. Pods are harvested when they are ripe, as beans in unripe pods have a low cocoa butter content, or low sugar content, impacting the ultimate flavor.

=== Cocoa beans ===
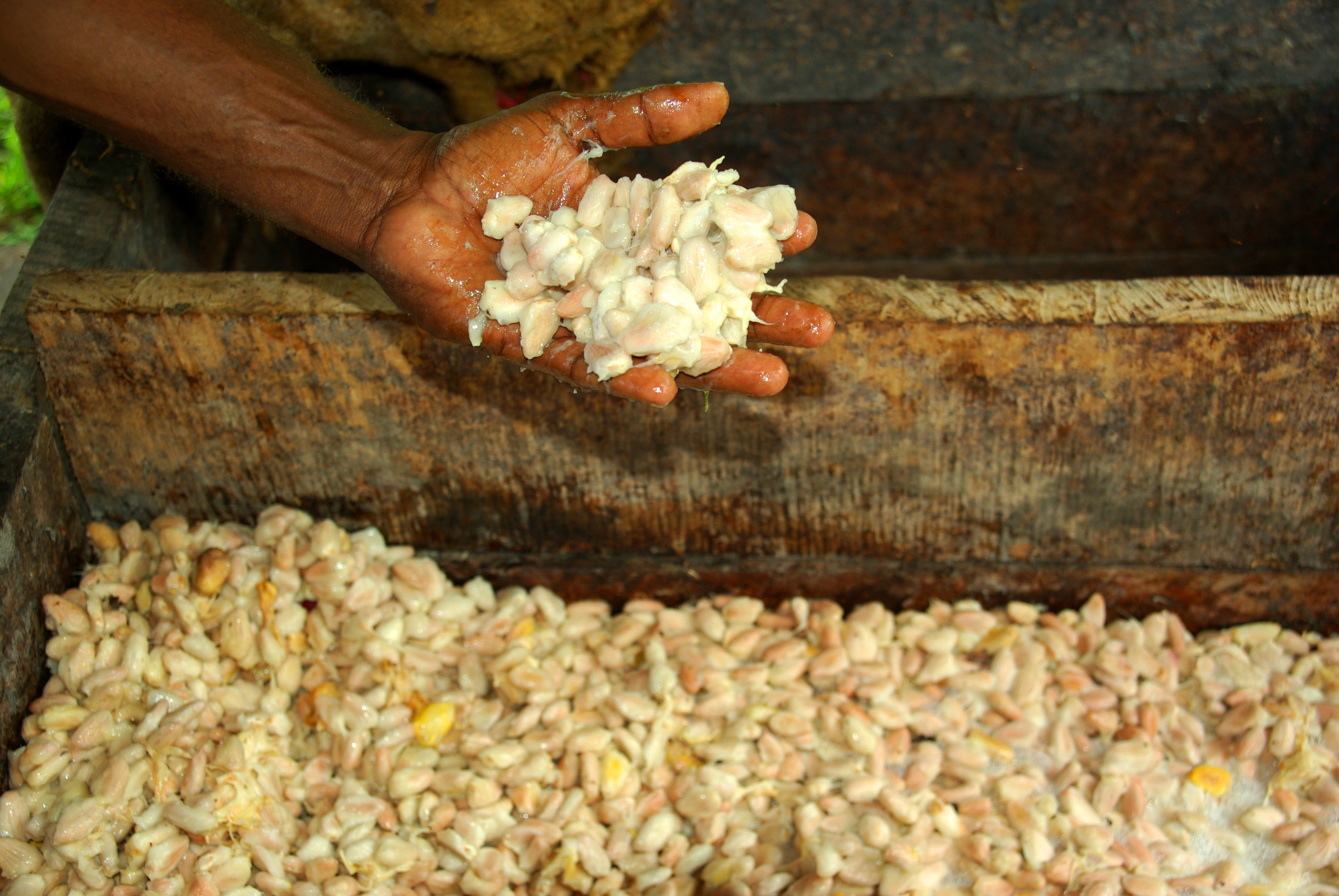
Fermenting cocoa beans

The beans, which are sterile within their pods, and their surrounding pulp are removed from the pods and placed in piles or bins to ferment. Micro-organisms, present naturally in the environment, ferment the seeds. Yeasts produce ethanol, lactic acid bacteria produce lactic acid, and acetic acid bacteria produce acetic acid. The fermentation process, which takes up to seven days, produces several flavor precursors, that eventually provide the chocolate taste.

After fermentation, the beans are dried to prevent mold growth. Where the weather permits it, this is done by spreading the beans out in the sun for five to seven days.

The dried beans are then transported to a chocolate manufacturing facility. The beans are cleaned (removing twigs, stones, and other debris), roasted, and graded. Next, the shell of each bean is removed to extract the nib.

=== From nibs to chocolate ===
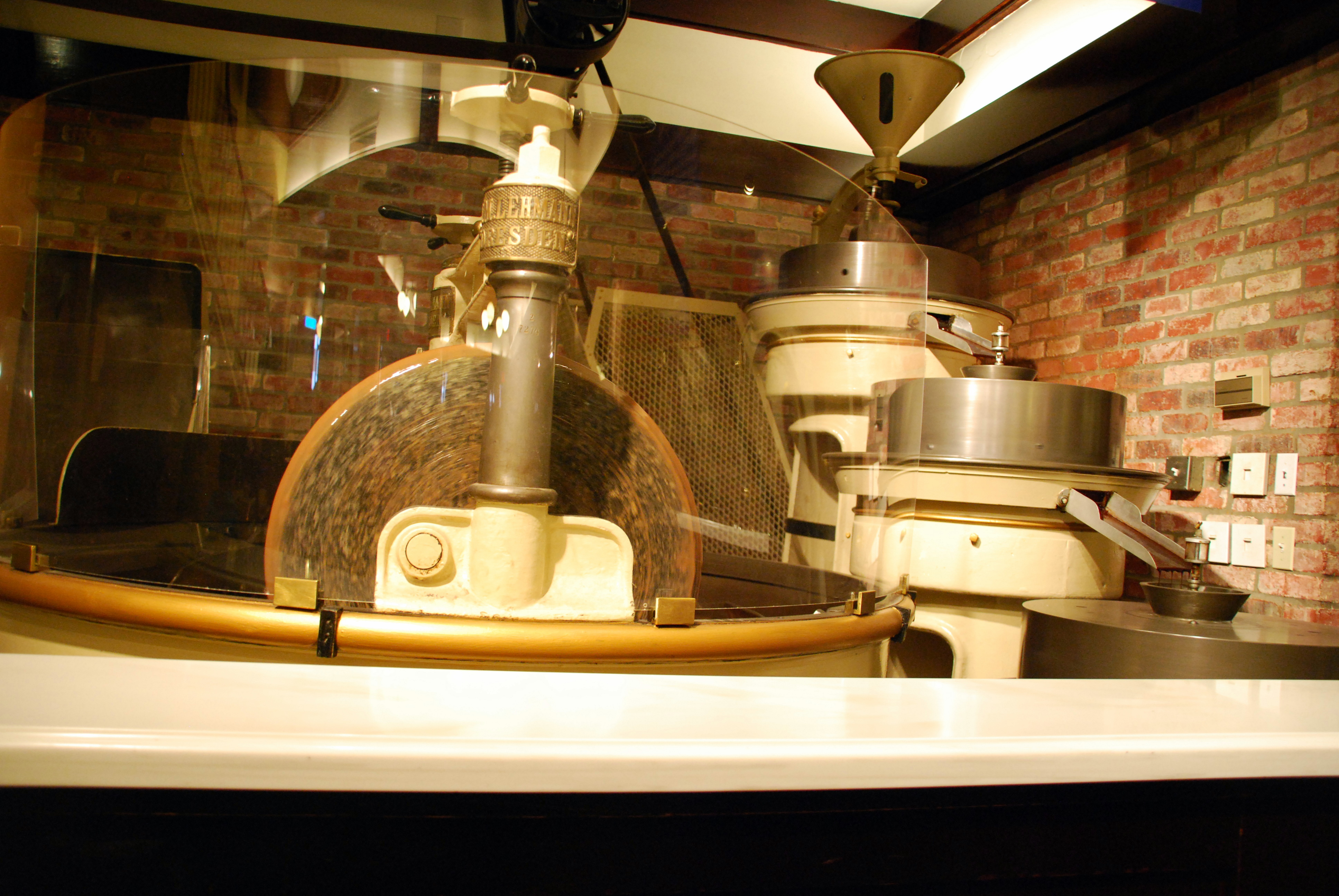
A chocolate mill (right) grinds and heats cocoa kernels into chocolate liquor. A melanger (left) mixes milk, sugar, and other ingredients into the liquor.

Next, the nibs are ground, producing chocolate liquor. The liquor can be further processed into cocoa powder and cocoa butter.

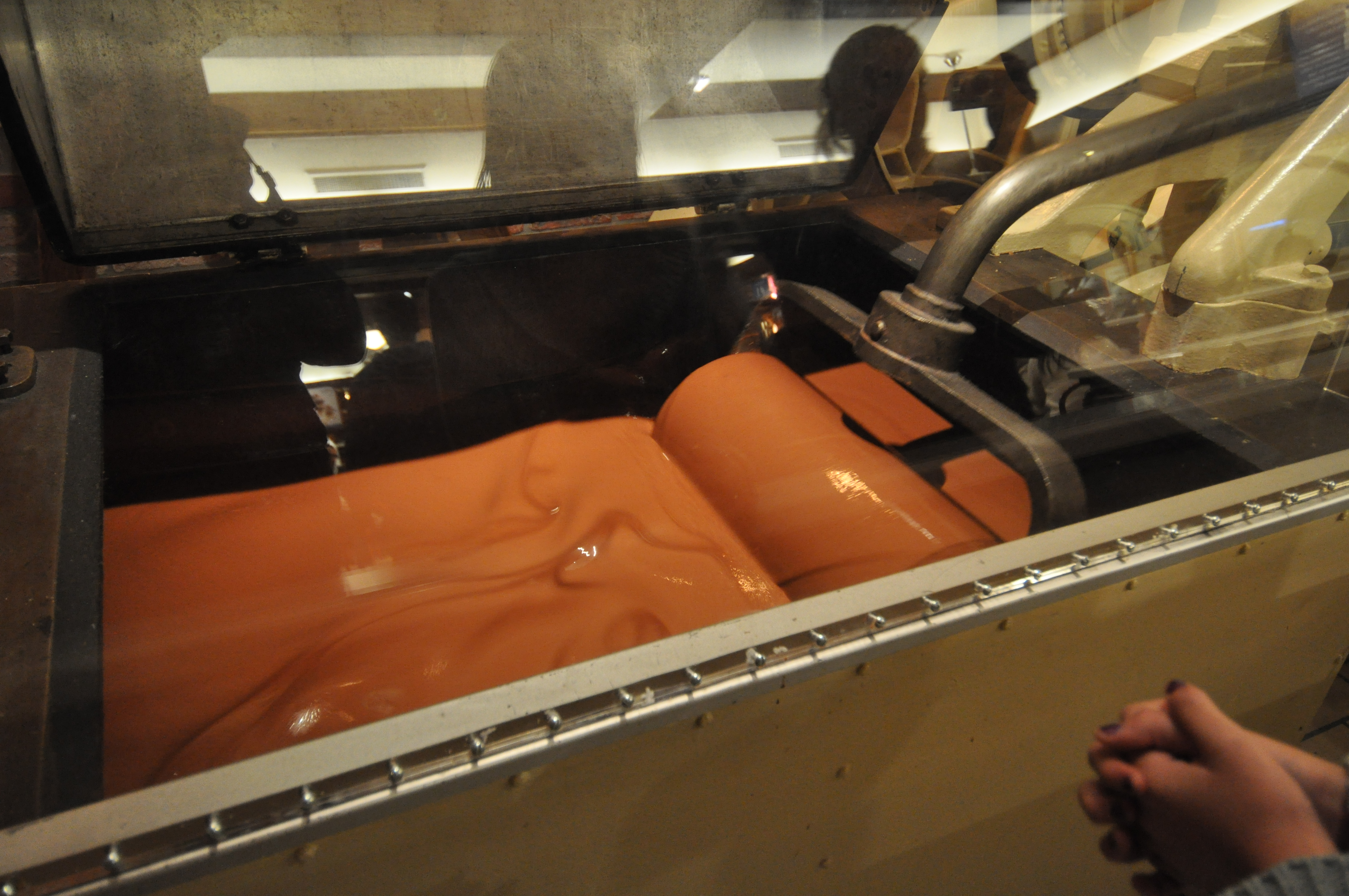
A longitudinal conche

The penultimate process is called conching. A conche is a container filled with metal beads, which act as grinders. The refined and blended chocolate mass is kept in a liquid state by frictional heat. Before conching, chocolate has an uneven and gritty texture. The conching process produces cocoa and sugar particles smaller than the tongue can detect (typically around 20 μm) and reduces rough edges, hence the smooth feel in the mouth. The length of the conching process determines the final smoothness and quality of the chocolate. After the process is complete, the chocolate mass is stored in tanks heated to about 45–50 °C (113–122 °F) until final processing.

After conching, chocolate is tempered to crystallize a small amount of cocoa butter. Cocoa butter is a polymorphic fat with six different crystal forms, but only one of them—Form V—gives chocolate its characteristic snap, gloss, and stable texture. Tempering eliminates the undesirable crystal forms and promotes the formation of Form V.

After chocolate has been tempered, it is molded into different shapes, including chocolate bars and chocolate chips.

=== Storage ===
Chocolate is very sensitive to temperature and humidity. Ideal storage temperatures are between 15 and 17 °C (59 and 63 °F), with a relative humidity of less than 50%. If refrigerated or frozen without containment, chocolate can absorb enough moisture to cause a whitish discoloration, the result of fat or sugar crystals rising to the surface. Various types of "blooming" effects can occur if chocolate is stored or served improperly.

Chocolate bloom is caused by storage temperature fluctuating or exceeding 24 °C (75 °F), while sugar bloom is caused by temperature below 15 °C (59 °F) or excess humidity. A fat bloom can be distinguished by touch; it disappears if the surface of affected chocolate is lightly rubbed. Although visually unappealing, chocolate suffering from bloom is safe for consumption and taste is unaffected. Bloom can be reversed by retempering the chocolate or using it for any use that requires melting the chocolate.

Chocolate is generally stored away from other foods, as it can absorb aromas. To avoid this, chocolate is packed or wrapped, then stored in darkness, in ideal humidity and temperature conditions.

== Health effects ==
Candies, milk chocolate
Nutritional value per 100 g (3.5 oz)
- Energy: 2,240 kJ (540 kcal)
- Carbohydrates: 59.4
- Sugars: 51.5 g
- Dietary fiber: 3.4 g
- Fat: 29.7
- Protein: 7.6 g
Vitamins and minerals
Vitamins	Quantity %DV^{†}
Vitamin A	195 IU
Thiamine (B1)	8% 0.1 mg
Riboflavin (B2)	23% 0.3 mg
Niacin (B3)	3% 0.4 mg
Pantothenic acid (B5)	10% 0.5 mg
Vitamin B6	0% 0.0 mg
Folate (B9)	3% 11 μg
Vitamin B12	29% 0.7 μg
Choline	8% 46.1 mg
Vitamin C	0% 0 mg
Vitamin E	3% 0.5 mg
Vitamin K	5% 5.7 μg
Minerals	Quantity %DV^{†}
Calcium	15% 189 mg
Iron	13% 2.4 mg
Magnesium	15% 63 mg
Manganese	22% 0.5 mg
Phosphorus	17% 208 mg
Potassium	12% 372 mg
Selenium	8% 4.5 μg
Sodium	3% 79 mg
Zinc	21% 2.3 mg
- Other constituents: Quantity
- Water: 1.5 g
- Caffeine: 20 mg
- Cholesterol: 23 mg
- Theobromine: 205 mg
- Link to USDA Database entry
- ^{†}Percentages estimated using US recommendations for adults, except for potassium, which is estimated based on expert recommendation from the National Academies.

=== Nutrition ===
One hundred grams of milk chocolate supplies 540 calories. It is 59% carbohydrates (52% as sugar and 3% as dietary fiber), 30% fat and 8% protein (table). Approximately 65% of the fat in milk chocolate is saturated, mainly palmitic acid and stearic acid, while the predominant unsaturated fat is oleic acid (table).

One hundred grams of milk chocolate is an excellent source (over 19% of the Daily Value, DV) of riboflavin, vitamin B12 and the dietary minerals manganese, phosphorus and zinc. Chocolate is a good source (10–19% DV) of calcium, magnesium and iron.

=== Phytochemicals ===
Chocolate contains polyphenols, especially flavan-3-ols (catechins) and smaller amounts of other flavonoids. It also contains alkaloids, such as theobromine, phenethylamine, and caffeine, which are under study for their potential effects in the body. These compounds are affected by the processing of cocoa, and the content in commercially available chocolate is highly variable.

=== Heavy metals ===
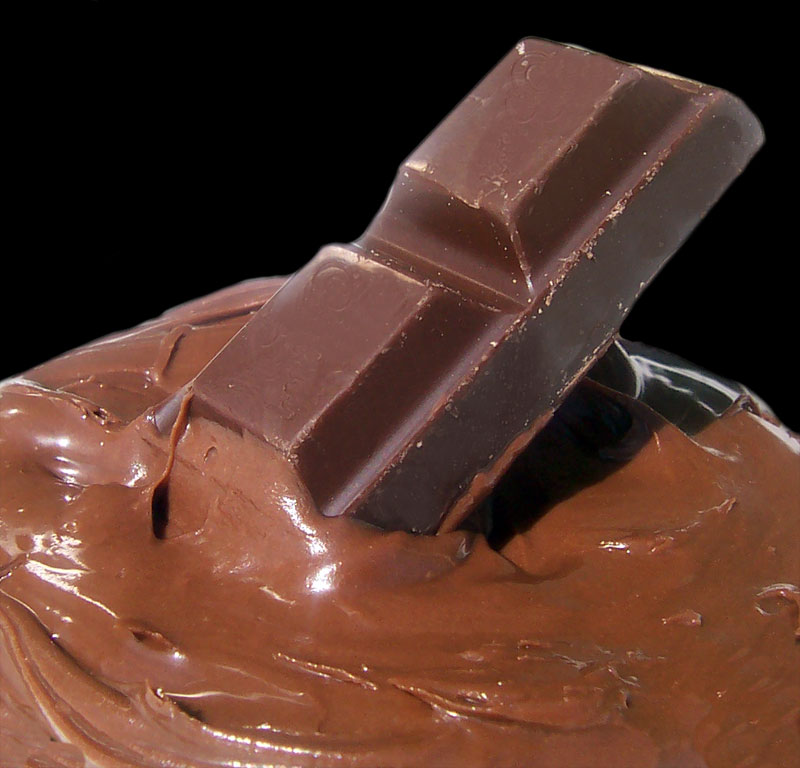
A chocolate bar in a bowl of melted chocolate

It is unlikely that chocolate consumption in small amounts causes lead poisoning. Some studies have shown that lead may bind to cocoa shells, and contamination may occur during the manufacturing process. One study showed the mean lead level in milk chocolate candy bars was 0.027 μg lead per gram of candy. Another study found that some chocolate purchased at U.S. supermarkets contained up to 0.965 μg per gram, close to the international (voluntary) standard limit for lead in cocoa powder or beans, which is 1 μg of lead per gram.

In 2006, the U.S. FDA lowered by one-fifth the amount of lead permissible in candy, but compliance is only voluntary. Studies concluded that "children, who are big consumers of chocolates, may be at risk of exceeding the daily limit of lead, [as] one 10 g cube of dark chocolate may contain as much as 20% of the daily lead oral limit. Moreover chocolate may not be the only source of lead in their nutrition" and "chocolate might be a significant source of cadmium and lead ingestion, particularly for children."

According to a 2005 study, the average lead concentration of cocoa beans is ≤ 0.5 ng/g, which is one of the lowest reported values for a natural food. However, during cultivation and production, chocolate may absorb lead from the environment (such as in atmospheric emissions of now unused leaded gasoline).

The European Food Safety Authority recommended a tolerable weekly intake for cadmium of 2.5 micrograms per kg of body weight for Europeans, indicating that consuming chocolate products caused exposure of about 4% among all foods eaten. Maximum levels for baby foods and chocolate/cocoa products were established under Commission Regulation (EU) No 488/2014. 1986 California Proposition 65 requires a warning label on chocolate products having more than 4.1 mg of cadmium per daily serving of a single product.

=== Caffeine ===
One tablespoonful (5 grams) of dry unsweetened cocoa powder has 12.1 mg of caffeine and a 25-g single serving of dark chocolate has 22.4 mg of caffeine. This is much less than the amount found in coffee, of which a single 7 oz. (200 ml) serving may contain 80–175 mg of caffeine, though studies have shown psychoactive effects in caffeine doses as low as 9 mg, and a dose as low as 12.5 mg was shown to have effects on cognitive performance.

=== Theobromine and oxalate ===
Chocolate may be a factor for heartburn in some people because one of its constituents, theobromine, may affect the esophageal sphincter muscle in a way that permits stomach acids to enter the esophagus. Theobromine poisoning is an overdosage reaction to the bitter alkaloid, which happens more frequently in domestic animals than humans. However, daily intake of 50–100 g cocoa (0.8–1.5 g theobromine) by humans has been associated with sweating, trembling, and severe headache.

Chocolate and cocoa contain moderate to high amounts of oxalate, which may increase the risk of kidney stones.

==== Toxicity to animals ====
In sufficient amounts, the theobromine found in chocolate is toxic to animals such as cats, dogs, horses, parrots, and small rodents because they are unable to metabolize the chemical effectively. If animals are fed chocolate, the theobromine may remain in the circulation for up to 20 hours, possibly causing epileptic seizures, heart attacks, internal bleeding, and eventually death. Medical treatment performed by a veterinarian involves inducing vomiting within two hours of ingestion and administration of benzodiazepines or barbiturates for seizures, antiarrhythmics for heart arrhythmias, and fluid diuresis.

A typical 20-kilogram (44 lb) dog will normally experience great intestinal distress after eating less than 240 grams (8.5 oz) of dark chocolate, but will not necessarily experience bradycardia or tachycardia unless it eats at least a half a kilogram (1.1 lb) of milk chocolate. Dark chocolate has 2 to 5 times more theobromine and thus is more dangerous to dogs. According to the Merck Veterinary Manual, approximately 1.3 grams of baker's chocolate per kilogram of a dog's body weight (0.02 oz/lb) is sufficient to cause symptoms of toxicity. For example, a typical 25-gram (0.88 oz) baker's chocolate bar would be enough to bring about symptoms in a 20-kilogram (44 lb) dog. In the 20th century, there were reports that mulch made from cocoa bean shells is dangerous to dogs and livestock.

=== Research ===
Commonly consumed chocolate is high in fat and sugar, which are associated with an increased risk for obesity when chocolate is consumed in excess.

Overall evidence is insufficient to determine the relationship between chocolate consumption and acne. Various studies point not to chocolate, but to the high glycemic nature of certain foods, like sugar, corn syrup, and other simple carbohydrates, as potential causes of acne, along with other possible dietary factors.

Food, including chocolate, is not typically viewed as addictive. Some people, however, may want or crave chocolate, leading to a self-described term, chocoholic.

By some popular myths, chocolate is considered to be a mood enhancer, such as by increasing sex drive or stimulating cognition, but there is little scientific evidence that such effects are consistent among all chocolate consumers. If mood improvement from eating chocolate occurs, there is not enough research to indicate whether it results from the favorable flavor or from the stimulant effects of its constituents, such as caffeine, theobromine, or their parent molecule, methylxanthine. A 2019 review reported that chocolate consumption does not improve depressive mood.

Reviews support a short-term effect of lowering blood pressure by consuming cocoa products, but there is limited evidence of long-term cardiovascular health benefit. Chocolate and cocoa are under preliminary research to determine if consumption affects the risk of certain cardiovascular diseases. Daily consumption of cocoa flavanols (minimum dose of 200 mg) appears to benefit platelet and vascular function. In 2023, the U.S. Food and Drug Administration (FDA) found that evidence supporting a possible reduction in cardiovascular disease risk from cocoa flavanols in high-flavanol cocoa powder had limited credible research.

== Labeling ==
Some manufacturers provide the percentage of chocolate in a finished chocolate confection as a label quoting percentage of "cocoa" or "cacao". This refers to the combined percentage of both non-fat cocoa solids and cocoa butter in the bar, although their individual proportions are not specified. The Belgian AMBAO certification mark indicates that no non-cocoa vegetable fats have been used in making the chocolate. A long-standing dispute between Britain on the one hand and Belgium and France over British use of vegetable fats in chocolate ended in 2000 with the adoption of new standards which permitted the use of up to five percent vegetable fats in clearly labelled products.

Chocolates that are organic or fair trade certified carry labels accordingly.

=== Legal definitions ===
In the US, the Food and Drug Administration does not allow a product to be referred to as "chocolate" if the product contains any of these ingredients.

In the EU a product can be sold as chocolate if it contains up to 5% vegetable oil, and must be labeled as "family milk chocolate" rather than "milk chocolate" if it contains 20% milk.

According to Canadian Food and Drug Regulations, a "chocolate product" is a food product that is sourced from at least one "cocoa product" and contains at least one of the following: "chocolate, bittersweet chocolate, semi-sweet chocolate, dark chocolate, sweet chocolate, milk chocolate, or white chocolate". A "cocoa product" is defined as a food product that is sourced from cocoa beans and contains "cocoa nibs, cocoa liquor, cocoa mass, unsweetened chocolate, bitter chocolate, chocolate liquor, cocoa, low-fat cocoa, cocoa powder, or low-fat cocoa powder".

== Industry ==
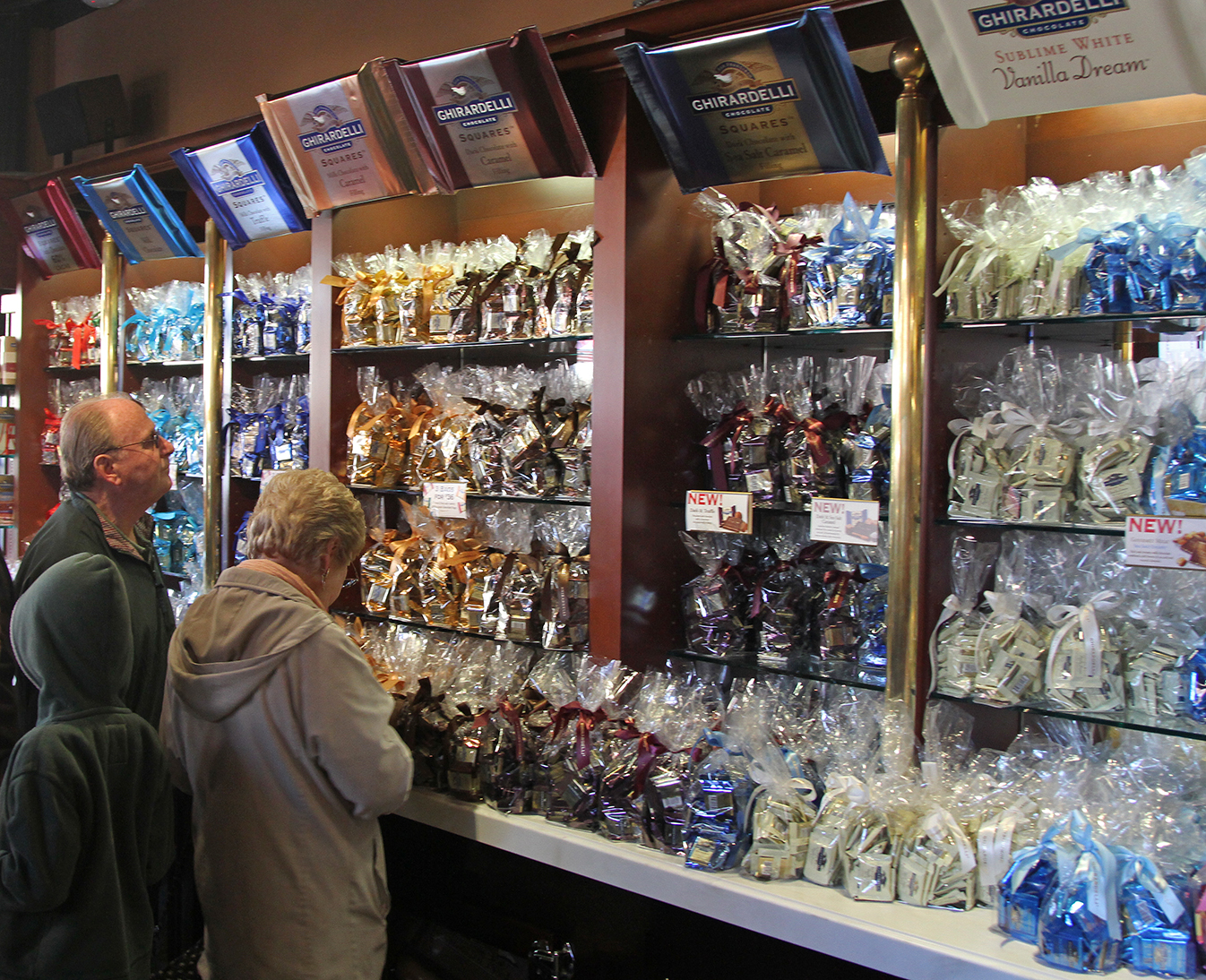
Packaged chocolate in the Ghirardelli Chocolate Company

Chocolate is a steadily growing, US$50 billion-a-year worldwide business as of 2009. As of 2006, Europe accounted for 45% of the world's chocolate revenue, and the US spent $20 billion in 2013. Big Chocolate is a grouping of major international chocolate companies in Europe and the US. In 2004, Mars and Hershey's alone accounted for two-thirds of US production.

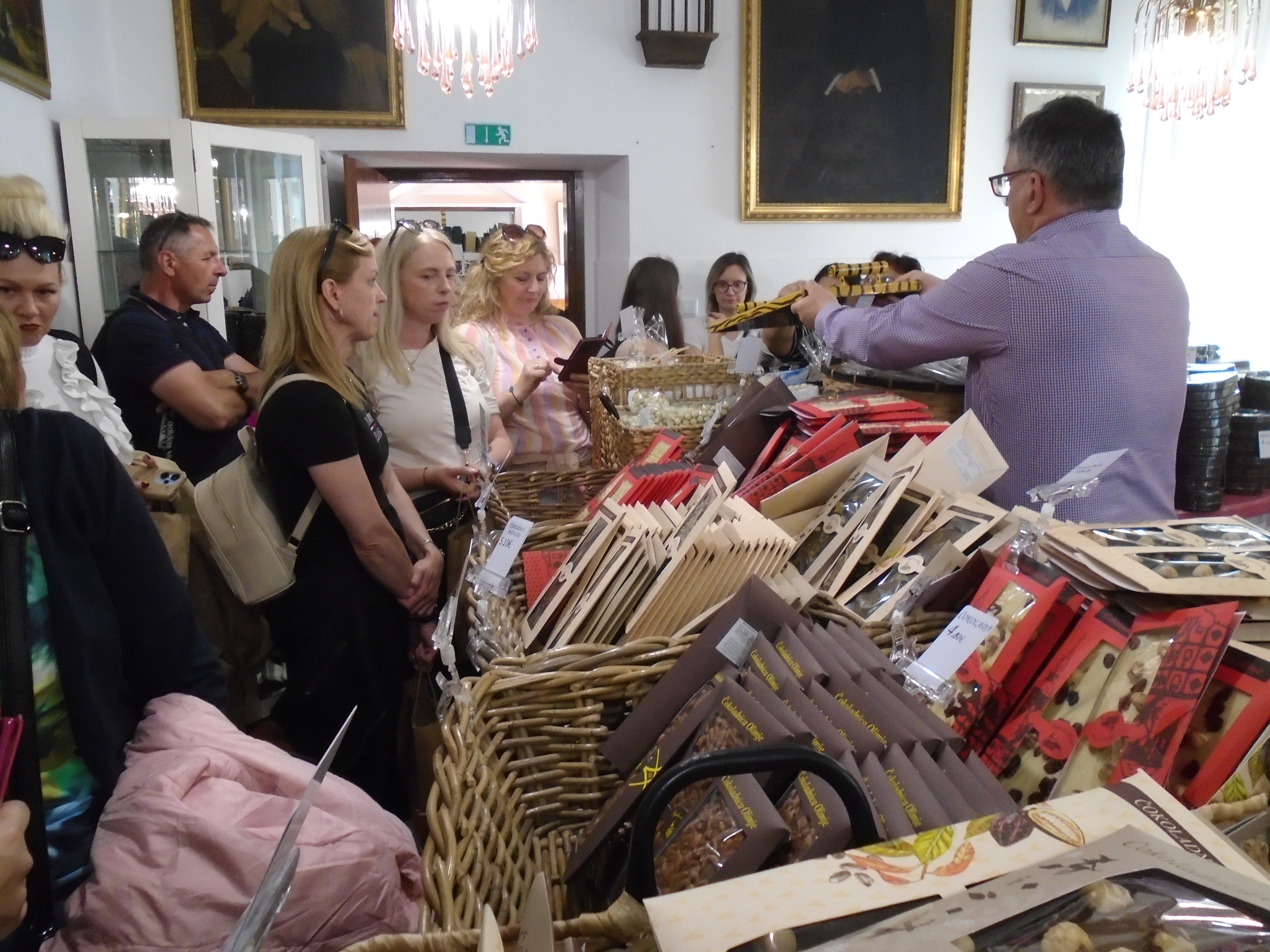
Chocolate shop of a family chocolate factory in Slovenia

Early in the 21st century, roughly two-thirds of the world's cocoa was produced in West Africa, with 43% sourced from Ivory Coast, which commonly used child labor. That year some 50 million people around the world depended on cocoa as a source of livelihood. As of 2007 in the UK, most chocolatiers purchase their chocolate from them, to melt, mold and package to their own design.

The two main jobs associated with creating chocolate candy are chocolate makers and chocolatiers. Chocolate makers use harvested cocoa beans and other ingredients to produce couverture chocolate (covering). Chocolatiers use the finished couverture to make chocolate candies (bars and truffles).

Production costs can be decreased by reducing cocoa content, usually by substituting cocoa butter with another fat. Cocoa growers object to allowing the resulting food to be called "chocolate", due to the risk of lower demand for their crops.

=== Manufacturers ===
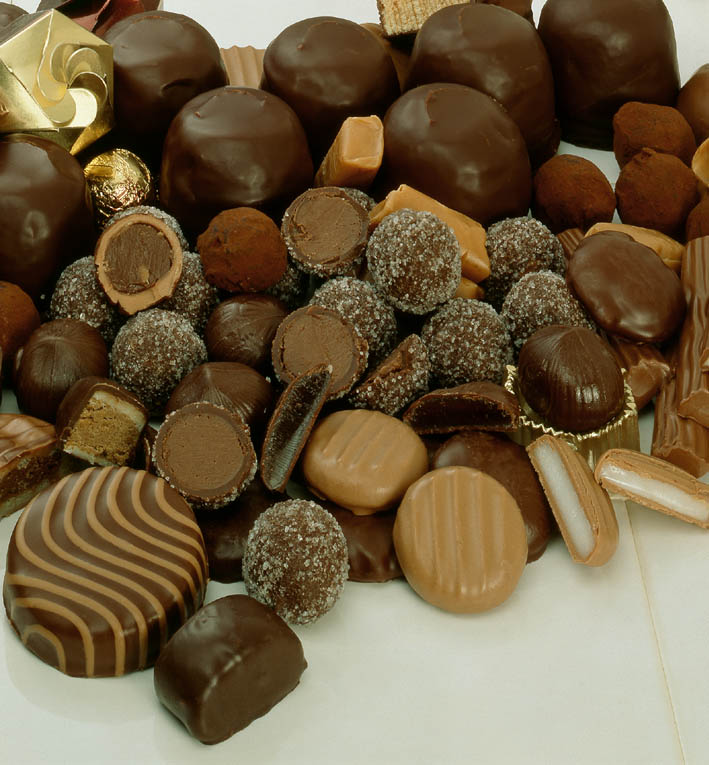
Chocolate with various fillings

Chocolate manufacturers produce a range of products from chocolate bars to fudge. Large manufacturers of chocolate products include Cadbury, Ferrero, Guylian, The Hershey Company, Lindt & Sprüngli, Mars, Incorporated, Milka, Neuhaus and Suchard.

Guylian is best known for its chocolate sea shells; Cadbury for its Dairy Milk and Creme Egg. The Hershey Company, the largest chocolate manufacturer in North America, produces the Hershey Bar and Hershey's Kisses. Mars Incorporated, a large privately owned U.S. corporation, produces Mars Bar, Milky Way, M&M's, Twix, and Snickers. Lindt is known for its truffle balls and gold foil-wrapped Easter bunnies.

Food conglomerates Nestlé SA and Mondelēz both have chocolate brands. Nestlé acquired Rowntree's in 1988 and now markets chocolates under their brand, including Rolo and Smarties (chocolate candies) and Kit Kat and Aero (chocolate bars); Kraft Foods through its 1990 acquisition of Jacobs Suchard, now owns Milka and Suchard. Fry's, Trebor Basset and the fair trade brand Green & Black's also belongs to the group.

=== Child labor in cocoa harvesting ===
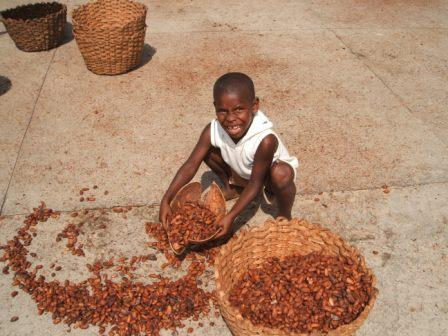
Child drying cacao in Chuao, Venezuela

The widespread use of children in cocoa production is controversial, not only for the concerns about child labor and exploitation, but also because according to a 2002 estimate, up to 12,000 of the 200,000 children then working in the Ivory Coast cocoa industry may have been victims of trafficking or slavery. Most attention on this subject has focused on West Africa, which collectively supplies 69 percent of the world's cocoa, and the Ivory Coast in particular, which supplies 35 percent of the world's cocoa. Thirty percent of children under age 15 in sub-Saharan Africa are child laborers, mostly in agricultural activities including cocoa farming. Major chocolate producers, such as Nestlé, buy cocoa at commodities exchanges where Ivorian cocoa is mixed with other cocoa.

As of 2017, approximately 2.1 million children in Ghana and Ivory Coast were involved in farming cocoa, carrying heavy loads, clearing forests, and being exposed to pesticides. As of 2018, a 3-year pilot program – conducted by Nestlé with 26,000 farmers mostly located in Ivory Coast – observed a 51% decrease in the number of children doing hazardous jobs in cocoa farming.

The US Department of Labor formed the Child Labor Cocoa Coordinating Group as a public-private partnership with the governments of Ghana and Ivory Coast to address child labor practices in the cocoa industry. The International Cocoa Initiative involving major cocoa manufacturers established the Child Labor Monitoring and Remediation System to monitor thousands of farms in Ghana and Ivory Coast for child labor conditions, but the program reached less than 20% of the child laborers.

In April 2018, the Cocoa Barometer report stated: "Not a single company or government is anywhere near reaching the sector-wide objective of the elimination of child labor, and not even near their commitments of a 70% reduction of child labor by 2020". They cited persistent poverty, the absence of schools, increasing world cocoa demand, more intensive farming of cocoa, and continued exploitation of child labor.

=== Fair trade ===
In the 2000s, some chocolate producers began to engage in fair trade initiatives, to address concerns about the low pay of cocoa laborers in developing countries. Traditionally, Africa and other developing countries received low prices for their exported commodities such as cocoa, which caused poverty. Fairtrade seeks to establish a system of direct trade from developing countries to counteract this system. One solution for fair labor practices is for farmers to become part of an agricultural cooperative. Cooperatives pay farmers a fair price for their cocoa so farmers have enough money for food, clothes, and school fees.

One of the main tenets of fair trade is that farmers receive a fair price, but this does not mean that the larger amount of money paid for fair trade cocoa goes directly to the farmers. The effectiveness of fair trade has been questioned. In a 2014 article, The Economist stated that workers on fair trade farms have a lower standard of living than on similar farms outside the fair trade system based on a study of tea and coffee farmers in Uganda and Ethiopia.

== Usage and consumption ==
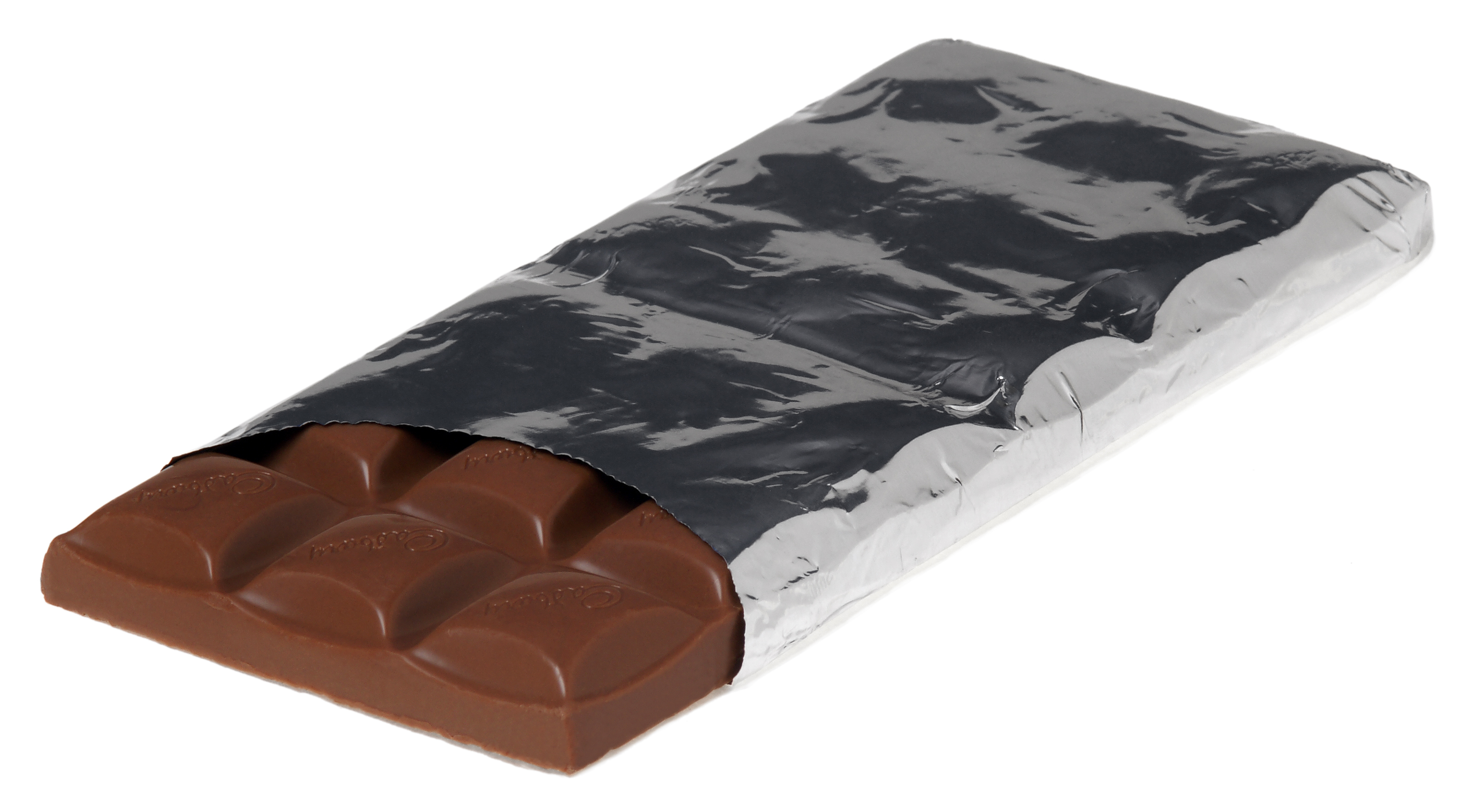
A Cadbury chocolate bar

Chocolate is sold in chocolate bars, which come in dark chocolate, milk chocolate and white chocolate varieties. Some bars that are mostly chocolate have other ingredients blended into the chocolate, such as nuts, raisins, or crisped rice. Chocolate is used as an ingredient in a huge variety of bars, which typically contain various confectionary ingredients (e.g., nougat, wafers, caramel, nuts) which are coated in chocolate.

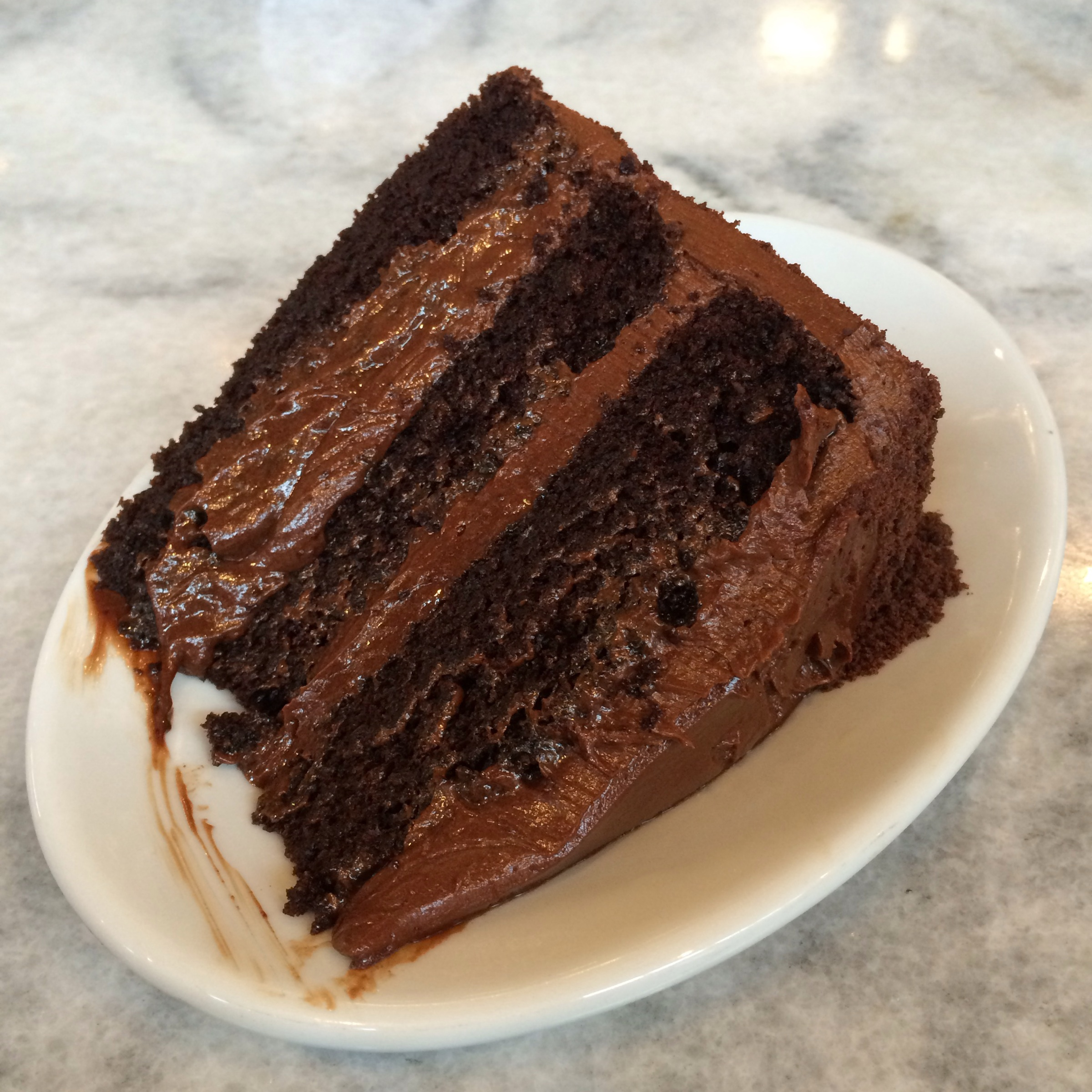
Chocolate cake with chocolate frosting

Chocolate is used as a flavoring product in many desserts, such as chocolate cakes, chocolate brownies, chocolate mousse and chocolate chip cookies. Numerous types of candy and snacks contain chocolate, either as a filling (e.g., M&M's) or as a coating (e.g., chocolate-coated raisins or chocolate-coated peanuts).

Some non-alcoholic beverages contain chocolate, such as chocolate milk, hot chocolate, chocolate milkshakes and tejate. Some alcoholic liqueurs are flavored with chocolate, such as chocolate liqueur and crème de cacao. Chocolate is a popular flavor of ice cream and pudding, and chocolate sauce is a commonly added as a topping on ice cream sundaes. The caffè mocha is an espresso beverage containing chocolate.

=== Eating experience ===
The experience of eating chocolate varies with the ingredients used. More sugary chocolates have a flavor that is more immediately apparent, while chocolates with higher cocoa percentages have flavors that take longer to be perceived but stay on the palate for longer. These chocolates with more cocoa are increasingly bitter.

== Society and culture ==
Chocolate is perceived to be different things at different times, including a sweet treat, a luxury product, a consumer good and a mood enhancer, the latter reputation in part driven by marketing. Chocolate is a popular metaphor for the black racial category. It has connotations of transgression and sexuality and is gendered as feminine. In the US there is a cultural practice of women consuming chocolate in secret; alone and with other women. Children use chocolate as a euphemism for feces. Chocolate is popularly understood to have "exotic" origins, Chinese folk medicine considers chocolate to be "heaty", and is to be avoided in hot weather.

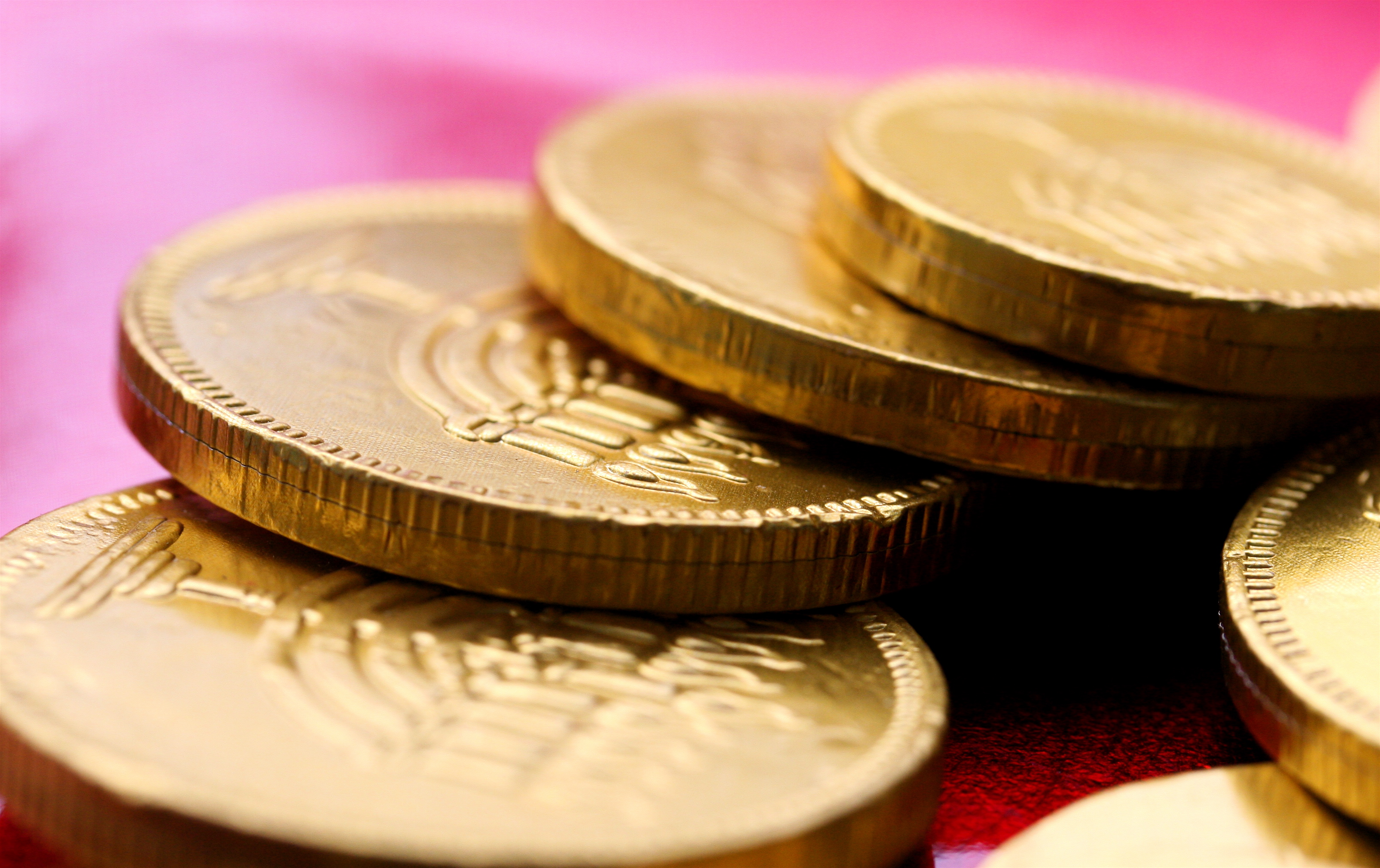
Hanukkah gelt

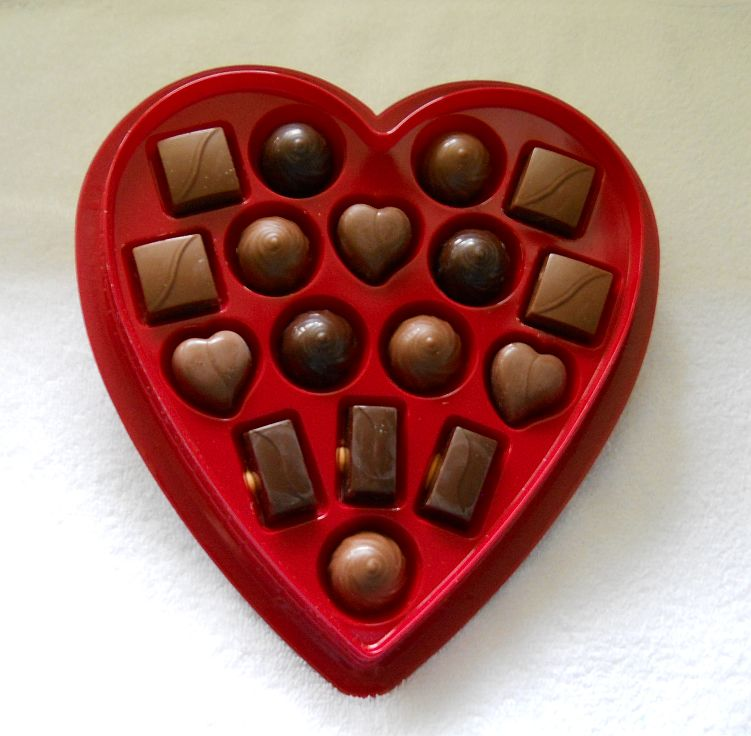
A gift box of chocolates, which is a common gift for Valentine's Day

Chocolate is associated with festivals such as Easter, when molded chocolate rabbits and eggs are traditionally given in Christian communities, and Hanukkah, when chocolate coins are given in Jewish communities. Chocolate hearts and chocolate in heart-shaped boxes are popular on Valentine's Day and are often presented along with flowers and a greeting card. In 1868, Cadbury created a decorated box of chocolates in the shape of a heart for Valentine's Day. Boxes of filled chocolates quickly became associated with the holiday. Chocolate is an acceptable gift on other holidays and on occasions such as birthdays. Many confectioners make holiday-specific chocolate candies. Chocolate Easter eggs or rabbits and Santa Claus figures are two examples. Such confections can be solid, hollow, or filled with sweets or fondant.

In 1964, Roald Dahl published a children's novel titled Charlie and the Chocolate Factory. The novel centers on a poor boy named Charlie Bucket who takes a tour through the greatest chocolate factory in the world, owned by the eccentric Willy Wonka. Two film adaptations of the novel were produced: Willy Wonka & the Chocolate Factory (1971) and Charlie and the Chocolate Factory (2005). A third adaptation, an origin prequel film titled Wonka, was released in 2023. Chocolat, a 1999 novel by Joanne Harris, was adapted for film in Chocolat which was released a year later.

Some artists have utilized chocolate in their art; Dieter Roth was influential in this beginning with his works in the 1960s casting human and animal figures in chocolate, which used the chocolate's inevitable decay to comment on contemporary attitudes towards the permanence of museum displays. Other works have played on the audience's ability to consume displayed chocolate, encouraged in Sonja Alhäuser's Exhibition Basics (2001) and painfully disallowed in Edward Ruscha's Chocolate Room (1970). In the 1980s and 90s, performance artists Karen Finley and Janine Antoni used chocolate's cultural popular associations of excrement and consumption, and desirability respectively to comment on the status of women in society.

== Flavors ==
Mint chocolate (or chocolate mint) is an individual flavor of chocolate, made by adding a mint flavoring, such as peppermint, spearmint, or crème de menthe, to chocolate. Mint chocolate can be found in a wide variety of confectionery items, such as candy, mints, cookies, mint chocolate chip ice cream, hot chocolate, and others. It is also marketed in a non-edible format in cosmetics with a distinctive mint fragrance. The chocolate component can be milk chocolate, regular dark chocolate, or white chocolate; due to this, mint chocolate has no one specific flavour, and so each chocolate-plus-flavor combination can be unique. The U.S. National Confectioners Association lists February 19 as "Chocolate Mint Day".

== See also ==
- Candy making
- Glossary of chocolate terms
- List of chocolate-covered foods
- List of chocolate beverages
- List of chocolate companies

== Sources ==
=== Books ===
- Aguilar-Moreno M (2006). "The Good and Evil of Chocolate in Colonial Mexico". In McNeil CL (ed.). Chocolate in Mesoamerica: A Cultural History of Cacao. Maya studies. Gainesville: University Press of Florida. ISBN 978-0-8130-2953-5. OCLC 940651076.
- Allen LL (2010). Chocolate Fortunes: The Battle for the Hearts, Minds, and Wallets of China's Consumers. Amacom. ISBN 978-0-8144-1432-3.
- Beckett ST (2019). The Science of Chocolate (3rd ed.). Croydon, United Kingdom: Royal Society of Chemistry. ISBN 978-1-78801-235-5.
- Clarence-Smith WG (2000). Cocoa and Chocolate, 1765-1914. New York: Routledge. ISBN 978-1-134-60778-5.
- Collins RF (2022). Chocolate: A Cultural Encyclopedia. Santa Barbara, California: ABC-Clio. ISBN 978-1-4408-7607-3.
- Coe SD, Coe MD (2013). The True History of Chocolate (3rd ed.). London: Thames & Hudson. ISBN 978-0-500-77093-1. OCLC 1085907808.
- Garrone M, Pieters H, Swinnen J (2016). "From Pralines to Multinationals: The Economic History of Belgian Chocolates". In Squicciarini MP, Swinnen J (eds.). The Economics of Chocolate. Oxford University Press. ISBN 978-0-19-872644-9. OCLC 939547061.
- Grivetti LE (2008a). "From Bean to Beverage: Historical Chocolate Recipes". In Grivetti LE, Shapiro HY (eds.). Chocolate: History, Culture, and Heritage. New Jersey: John Wiley & Sons, Inc. ISBN 978-0-470-41131-5.
- Grivetti LE (2008b). "Medicinal Chocolate in New Spain, Western Europe, and North America". In Grivetti LE, Shapiro HY (eds.). Chocolate: History, Culture, and Heritage. New Jersey: John Wiley & Sons, Inc. ISBN 978-0-470-41131-5.
- Leissle K (2018). Cocoa. Polity. ISBN 978-1-5095-1320-8. OCLC 988580966.
- Hackenesch S (2017). Chocolate and Blackness: A Cultural History. University of Chicago Press. ISBN 978-3-593-50776-7.
- MacLeod MJ (2000). "Cacao". In Kiple KF, Coneè Oyurnelas K (eds.). Cambridge World History of Food. Vol. 1. Cambridge University Press. ISBN 978-0-521-40214-9.
- McCabe M, de Waal Malefyt T (2020). "Women and chocolate: identity narratives of sensory and sensual enjoyment". In de Waal Malefyt T, McCabe M (eds.). Women, Consumption and Paradox. Anthropology and Business: Crossing boundaries, innovating praxis. Oxford: Routledge. ISBN 978-0-367-46314-4.
- Moore A (2005). "Kakao and Kaka: Chocolate and the Excretory Imagination of Nineteenth-Century Europe". In Forth CE, Carden-Coyne A (eds.). Cultures of the Abdomen: Diet, Digestion, and Fat in the Modern World. Palgrave Macmillan. doi:10.1057/9781403981387. ISBN 978-1-349-52880-6.
- Moss S, Badenoch A (2009). Chocolate: A Global History. London: Reaktion Books. ISBN 978-1-86189-524-0.
- Presilla ME (2009). The New Taste of Chocolate, Revised: A Cultural and Natural History of Cacao with Recipes. New York: Ten Speed Press. ISBN 978-1-58008-950-0.
- Scarpellini E (2016). Food and Foodways in Italy from 1861 to the Present. Translated by Mazhar NG. Washington, DC: Palgrave Macmillan. ISBN 978-1-349-56098-1.
- Segnit N (2010). The Flavour Thesaurus. London, England: Bloomsbury Publishing. ISBN 978-0-7475-9977-7.
- Snyder, Olsen BF, Brindle LP (2008). "From Stone Metates to Steel Mills: The Evolution of Chocolate Manufacturing". In Grivetti LE, Shapiro HY (eds.). Chocolate: History, Culture, and Heritage. New Jersey: John Wiley & Sons, Inc. ISBN 978-0-470-41131-5.
- Vail G (2008). "Cacao Use in Yucatán Among the Pre-Hispanic Maya". In Grivetti LE, Shapiro HY (eds.). Chocolate: History, Culture, and Heritage. New Jersey: John Wiley & Sons, Inc. ISBN 978-0-470-41131-5.
- Walker T (2008). "Establishing Cacao Plantation Culture in the Atlantic World". In Grivetti LE, Shapiro HY (eds.). Chocolate: History, Culture, and Heritage. New Jersey: John Wiley & Sons, Inc. ISBN 978-0-470-41131-5.

=== Journal articles ===
- Dakin K, Wichmann S (2000). "Cacao and Chocolate: A Uto-Aztecan perspective". Ancient Mesoamerica. 11 (1): 55–75. doi:10.1017/S0956536100111058. ISSN 0956-5361. S2CID 162616811.
- Dillinger TL, Barriga P, Escárcega S, et al. (1 August 2000). "Food of the Gods: Cure for Humanity? A Cultural History of the Medicinal and Ritual Use of Chocolate". The Journal of Nutrition. 130 (8): 2057S–2072S. doi:10.1093/jn/130.8.2057S. ISSN 0022-3166. PMID 10917925.
- Fouet O, Loor Solórzano RG, Rhoné B, et al. (27 October 2022). "Collection of native Theobroma cacao L. accessions from the Ecuadorian Amazon highlights a hotspot of cocoa diversity". Plants, People, Planet. 4 (6): 605–617. Bibcode:2022PlPP....4..605F. doi:10.1002/ppp3.10282.
- Kaufman T, Justeson J (2007). "The history of the word for cacao in Ancient Mesoamerica". Ancient Mesoamerica. 18 (2): 193–237. doi:10.1017/S0956536107000211.
- Lanaud C, Vignes H, Utge J, et al. (7 March 2024). "A revisited history of cacao domestication in pre-Columbian times revealed by archaeogenomic approaches". Scientific Reports. 14 (1): 2972. Bibcode:2024NatSR..14.2972L. doi:10.1038/s41598-024-53010-6. ISSN 2045-2322. PMC 10920634. PMID 38453955.
- Mathias M (1 December 2022). "Chocolate and the French novel: modernity, language, nature". Modern & Contemporary France. 31 (4): 529–544. doi:10.1080/09639489.2022.2134324.
- Norton M (April 2004). "Conquests of Chocolate". OAH Magazine of History. 18 (3): 16. doi:10.1093/maghis/18.3.14. JSTOR 25163677.
- Sampeck KE, Thayn J (2017). "Translating Tastes: A Cartography of Chocolate Colonialism". In Schwartzkopf S, Sampeck KE (eds.). Substance and Seduction: Ingested Commodities in Early Modern Mesoamerica. University of Texas Press. doi:10.7560/313862-006. ISBN 978-1-4773-1388-6.
- Swanton M (9 May 2024). "Mesoamerican mantic names as an etymological source of Mixtec vocabulary". Ancient Mesoamerica. 35 (2). Cambridge University Press: 619–644. doi:10.1017/S0956536124000026.
- Swanton M, de Ávila A, van Doesburg B (2010). "Comments on Kaufman and Justeson: "The History of the Word for Cacao in Ancient Mesoamerica"". Ancient Mesoamerica. 21 (2): 415–441. doi:10.1017/S0956536111000186.

=== Webpages ===
- Martin CD, Sampeck K (8 January 2021). "From Cocoa Farms to Candy Chutes". Anthropology News. Archived from the original on 16 April 2026.
