= Delbourgo =

Delbourgo is a surname. Notable people with the surname include:

- James Delbourgo (born 1972), British historian of science
- Robert Delbourgo (born 1940), Australian physicist
