= Milk chocolate =

Solid chocolate containing added milk

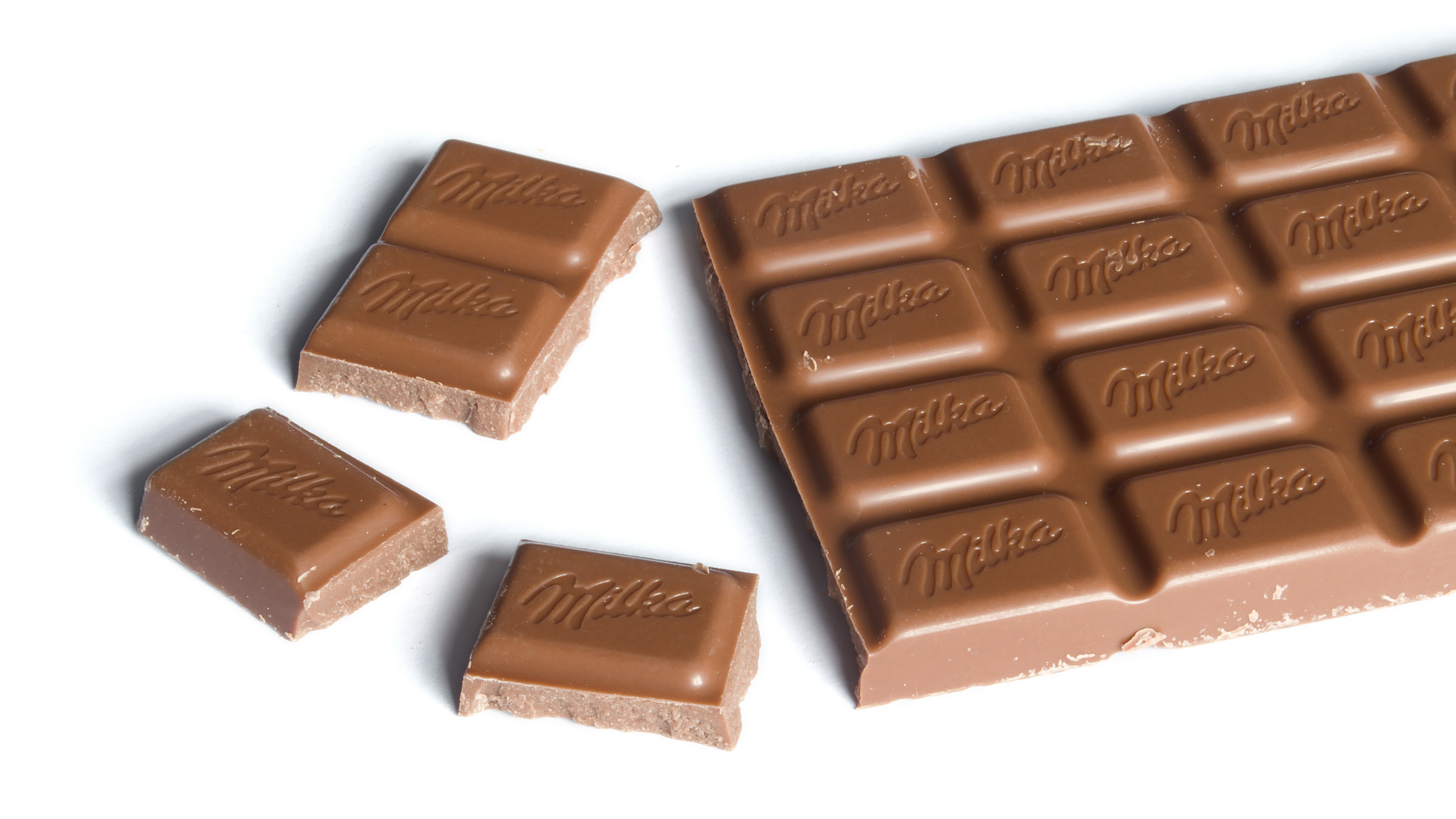
- A Milka chocolate bar, 30% cocoa
- Type: Confectionery
- Place of origin: Switzerland
- Created by: Daniel Peter
- Invented: 1875; 151 years ago
- Main ingredients: Cocoa butter; Cocoa mass; Milk; Sugar

Milk chocolate is a form of solid chocolate containing cocoa, sugar and milk. It is the most consumed type of chocolate, and is used in a wide diversity of bars and other confectionery products. Although rich in cocoa butter, milk chocolate contains a smaller amount of cocoa mass than dark chocolate does, and (as with white chocolate) contains milk solids. While its taste has been key to its popularity, milk chocolate was historically promoted as a healthy food, particularly for children.

Major milk chocolate producers include Ferrero, Hershey, Mondelez, Mars and Nestlé; collectively these supply over half of the world's chocolate. Four-fifths of all milk chocolate is sold in the United States and Europe, and increasing amounts are consumed in both China and Latin America.

Chocolate was originally sold and consumed as a beverage in pre-Columbian times, and upon its introduction to Western Europe. The word chocolate arrived in the English language about 1600, but initially described dark chocolate. The first use of the term "milk chocolate" was for a beverage brought to London from Jamaica in 1687, but it was not until the Swiss inventor Daniel Peter successfully combined cocoa and condensed milk in 1875 that the milk chocolate bar was invented. Switzerland developed as the centre of milk chocolate production, particularly after the development of the conche by Rodolphe Lindt, and was increasingly exporting to an international market. Milk chocolate became mainstream at the beginning of the twentieth century following the launch of Milka, Cadbury Dairy Milk and the Hershey bar, inducing a dramatic increase in world cocoa consumption.

To provide ethical assurances on cocoa harvesting for consumers, Fair Trade and UTZ Certified chocolate was established in the 21st century.

== History ==
The word "chocolate" was first used in English in 1604. The first instance of "milk chocolate" appeared soon after, referring to a drink of chocolate combined with milk. In 1687, Hans Sloane, an Irish physician and collector, introduced the beverage to London after seeing the people of Jamaica enjoying the drink. The preparation was promoted for its medicinal properties, and was manufactured by Nicholas Sanders and William White, and was joined by other milk chocolates around the city. From there, milk chocolate spread, first to France, where the pharmacist to Louis XVI, Sulpice Debauve, introduced the drink to the Court, and then further afield, reaching as far as the United States by 1834.

Early attempts to make eating milk chocolate were foiled by the substantial water content of milk which did not willingly mix with cocoa butter (a fat); efforts at combining the two produced chocolates that were an "oily and milky mess". In Dresden in the German Confederation, Jordan & Timaeus were developing a mechanism to produce hard chocolate using steam power. On 23 May 1839, they advertised a solid chocolate containing fresh milk, calling it "steam chocolate" (dampfchocolade). However, that version of milk chocolate did not become successful and when major companies like Fry's of Bristol and Lindt of Zürich started producing eating chocolate in the 1840s, they only made dark chocolate.

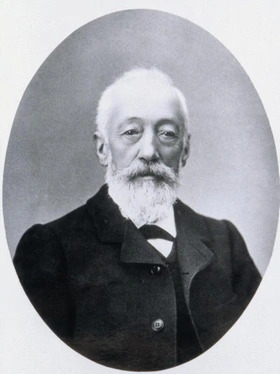
Daniel Peter, Swiss chocolatier who combined chocolate and milk

In 1875, the Swiss entrepreneur and chocolatier Daniel Peter, based in Vevey and related to the Cailler family, first successfully combined cocoa mass, cocoa butter, and sugar with condensed milk (recently created by his neighbour and friend Henri Nestlé) to produce solidified milk chocolate. However, this was not meant to be eaten, but it was meant to be used for chocolate milk drinks; milk chocolate as we know it today was only created a decade later. In 1887, the first eating milk chocolate brand, Gala Peter, was finally launched. Daniel Peter called his product 'Gala' after the Greek word meaning 'milk'. Milk chocolate also benefited from another recent Swiss invention, Rodolphe Lindt's conche, which allowed the creation of a smoother chocolate.

Not only did milk soften the bitterness of chocolate and refined its taste, but it also lowered its production cost due to a lower cocoa content. As a consequence, Peter's recipe leaked to other nearby manufacturers: Cailler and Kohler. In 1898, Cailler opened its new factory at Broc, where milk chocolate began to be produced on a large scale. Peter also opened a larger factory at Orbe in 1901, before merging with Kohler. The same year, Suchard of Neuchâtel launched the Milka brand; Carl Russ-Suchard had previously developed a first milk bar in 1896. The Swiss chocolate industry also expanded in the late nineteenth century with the establishment of new companies, such as Frey and Tobler. From these developments, Switzerland soon dominated the chocolate market. Production increased dramatically, and by 1905, the country was producing 15,000 tonnes (15,000 long tons; 17,000 short tons) of chocolate, a vast proportion of it exported.

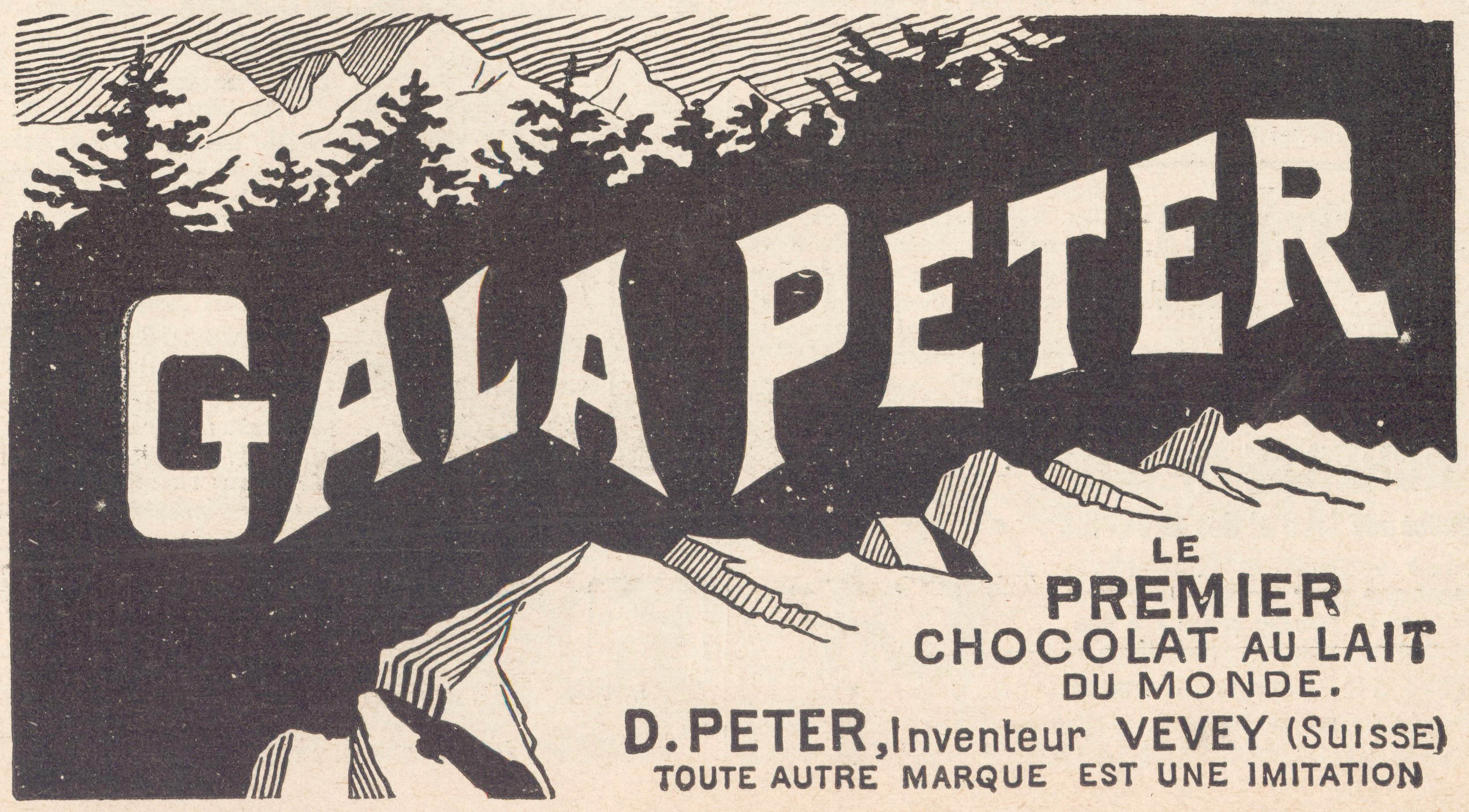
1905 ad for Gala Peter stating "The world's first milk chocolate"

Meanwhile, there were other developments outside Switzerland. Swiss dominance was challenged in 1905 by a product from England, Cadbury Dairy Milk. Although there had been other milk chocolates produced outside Switzerland before – Cadbury themselves had produced one in 1897 – they suffered from low sales. In contrast, Dairy Milk quickly rose in prominence and, by the 1920s, was the bestselling chocolate in the UK. Simultaneously, in 1900, Milton Hershey had introduced the first Hershey bar, which revolutionised the popularity of milk chocolate in the United States. Although initially only available in Pennsylvania, by 1906 it was sold across the country. Popularity blossomed, particularly following World War I, when the United States Army issued chocolate bars to troops, for many their first taste of milk chocolate. By 1911, Peter's milk chocolate recipe represented half of the world's chocolate consumption. Milk chocolate became the standard of what the public thought chocolate should be.

As a result of the increasing popularity of chocolate, especially among the working and middle-class, cocoa consumption began to grow extraordinarily; global demand grew 800 percent between 1880 and 1900. To meet these demands, cocoa production expanded, notably in West Africa, where the Forastero variety began to be mass cultivated in the early twentieth century. Although considered inferior to the Criollo variety, the Forastero type bean is more suited for the manufacture of milk chocolate and is cheaper to produce owing to its higher yields. Countries in West Africa eventually dominated world production of cocoa. Conversely, milk became the critical ingredient. Contrary to cocoa and sugar, milk spoils quickly, therefore it cannot be stored for long periods of time. This favored the implantation of large factories (as well as new populations of workers) in the countryside, where abundant fresh milk supplies are readily available. The Cailler factory of Broc and the Hershey factory of Derry Township are typical examples. The popularity of milk chocolate and the wide availability of milk also favoured the creation in the 1930s of a new variety of chocolate containing even more milk: white chocolate.

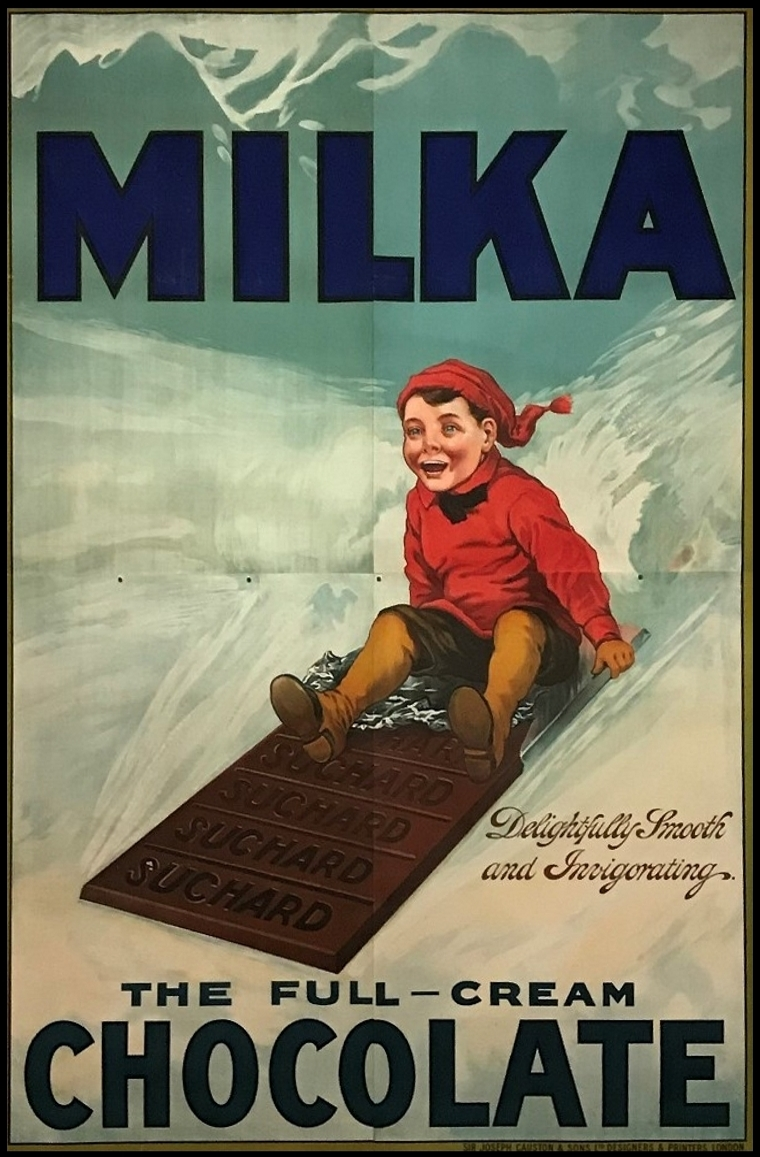
Since its beginning, milk chocolate has been associated with Alpine scenery.

Over the decades, milk chocolate manufacture spread worldwide and new brands appeared. In 1910, Arthur and George Ensor created the first milk chocolate in Canada, using milk from Jersey cows. At the same time, Belgian chocolate production also expanded rapidly. From small beginnings in the 1870s, by the 1920s, there were ninety chocolate manufacturers around Brussels alone. In 1926, Meiji brought out their bar, the first example to be made in Japan. Milk chocolate swiftly dominated chocolate sales in most markets. It even found a place during World War II, when US troops carried D Ration chocolate, nicknamed Logan Bars after Quartermaster Paul Logan, as an emergency supply. At the same time, new ways of presenting chocolate appeared, from different shapes, like Cadbury Buttons, to the profusion of boxed varieties that became a feature of Belgian chocolate.

At the same time, the number of independent manufacturers declined sharply. The first consolidations in the industry were in Switzerland, where the takeover of Lindt by Sprüngli took place in 1899, and Nestlé had already emerged as the largest manufacture in the country by 1929. However, pace quickened in the latter half of the century. During the last three decades of the twentieth century, there were over 200 takeovers in the industry. By 2001, over half the global chocolate market was held by 17 companies. By 2013, the top four manufacturers, Mondelez, Mars, Nestlé and Ferrero, comprised 49 percent of the sales.

In 2018, the global market for milk chocolate was worth $63.2 billion, and is expected to approach $73 billion by 2024. Consumption is dominated by the United States and Europe, which between them consumed over 80 percent of global production. However, the new century saw expansion in different markets. For example, between 2000 and 2013, the areas that saw the highest growth included the Middle East and Africa (where retail value rose 239 percent), Latin America (up 228 percent). Even in China and Japan, which traditionally are places of very low milk consumption, milk chocolate sales increased at the start of the twenty-first century. Between 1999 and 2003, Chinese chocolate imports rose from $17.7 million to $50 million. By 2007, over 38 percent of chocolate sales in China were milk chocolate. By 2018, the value of sales by Japanese chocolatier Meiji was approaching that of the top producers in Europe, and the total sales by the group had surpassed the total for all confectionery sales by Hershey, putting the American company outside a top five ranking.

Although dark chocolate regained some popularity in the late twentieth century, milk chocolate remains the most preferred and consumed type of chocolate. Some chocolate consumers, who perceive it as saccharine and lacking in chocolate flavor, hold it in poor regard; chocolate maker John Scharffenberger for instance characterized the cocoa content as only being "food coloring".

== Nutrition ==
Milk chocolate bar
Nutritional value per 100 g
- Energy: 2,364 kJ (565 kcal)
- Carbohydrates: 50.8 g
- Fat: 37.6 g
- Protein: 7.65 g
Vitamins and minerals
Vitamins	Quantity %DV^{†}
Thiamine (B1)	9% 0.112 mg
Riboflavin (B2)	23% 0.298 mg
Niacin (B3)	2% 0.386 mg
Vitamin B6	28% 0.472 mg
Folate (B9)	3% 12 μg
Vitamin B12	31% 0.75 μg
Vitamin E	3% 0.51 mg
Minerals	Quantity %DV^{†}
Calcium	15% 189 mg
Iron	13% 2.35 mg
Magnesium	15% 63 mg
Manganese	20% 0.47 mg
Phosphorus	17% 208 mg
Potassium	12% 372 mg
Selenium	8% 4.5 μg
Zinc	21% 2.3 mg
- Other constituents: Quantity
- Water: 1.5 g
- Caffeine: 20 mg
- Theobromine: 205 mg
- Link to USDA Database entry
- ^{†}Percentages estimated using US recommendations for adults, except for potassium, which is estimated based on expert recommendation from the National Academies.

Milk chocolate is 51% carbohydrates, 38% fat, 8% protein, and 2% water (table). In a reference amount of 100 grams (3.5 oz), milk chocolate supplies 565 calories of food energy, and is a rich source (20% or more of the Daily Value, DV) of vitamin B12 (31% DV), riboflavin (25% DV), and dietary minerals, such as phosphorus (30% DV) (table). Milk chocolate has moderate content (10–19% DV) of thiamine and several minerals.

== Manufacturing and marketing ==
While all milk chocolate contains cocoa, milk and sugar, the proportion of these ingredients varies between countries and brands, which in turn affects its taste. For example, Belgian chocolate is known for its mild milky flavor, while some Russian brands have a strong cocoa taste. Cost is the main reason for the introduction of cocoa butter replacements like coconut and palm oil. However, there are also regulatory reasons. In 1973, for example, the European Union decreed that chocolate must have a minimum of 35 percent total dry cocoa solids. China has also introduced legislation to require locally produced milk chocolate to contain 25 percent cocoa butter.

Milk chocolate has been presented as a health food since Cadbury first advertised Sloane's Milk Chocolate for its medicinal properties in the nineteenth century. In the 1920s, the Baby Ruth bar was touted as a health food for children by Allan Roy Dafoe. Advertisements pronounced that chocolate bars combined both a source of essential energy and the "perfectly balanced food" of milk.

Cocoa butter was claimed to reduce tooth decay. Chocolate was claimed to produce calming effects, reducing stress, and producing a similar feeling to falling in love.

=== Processing ===
Milk chocolate is manufactured from cocoa, milk and sugar. It is the manufacturing process, rather than the raw ingredients, which is most responsible for each brand's flavor.

The ingredient which defines the product as chocolate, cocoa bean, is mainly grown in Southeast Asia, South America, and West Africa, particularly the Ivory Coast, which supplies 40 percent of the total global cocoa market. Once the cocoa pods are harvested, the seeds, known as "beans", are removed and fermented, then dried. They are then taken to a processing plant where they are cleaned and roasted. The beans are then ground, usually in a two-stage process, first with an impact mill to liquify the cocoa, and then a ball mill. Milk chocolate usually contains a much larger proportion of cocoa butter than the one that is naturally present in cocoa liquor; unlike dark chocolate, a large part of non-fat cocoa solids is going to be replaced by milk solids. Therefore, cocoa butter has to be produced in parallel by separating cocoa liquor into cocoa butter and cocoa powder. Milk chocolate has a minimum cacao content of 10% in the US, and has been produced with as much as 70% cacao.

At this stage, the two other key ingredients come into the process: milk and sugar. Milk ingredients are complex and critical in delivering the properties and taste to milk chocolate. Milk-origin (terroir) and associated farming have become an important marketing topic. Milk substitutes like rice milk are also used to create lactose-free milk-like chocolate. Milk is often added in powdered form, particularly in German, French, and Belgian milk chocolate, as excess water would damage the flowing properties of the liquid chocolate. Spray dried full-fat milk powder is normally used, but alternatives include anhydrous full fat or skimmed milk powders, and the choice affects the overall flavor. Condensed milk is preferred by some manufacturers, particularly where milk production is seasonal. In most of Europe, milk chocolate must contain at least 3.5% milkfat.

Sugar, the last major ingredient, is added at the same time as the milk powder, either in a roll refiner or conche. Sugar is an international commodity, with production of sugar cane led by Brazil, India, Thailand, China and Australia. Sugar beet is also used. Sometimes the milk and sugar are mixed separately before being added to the liquid cocoa mass and cocoa butter. About 45 to 50% of most milk chocolate is sugar, by weight.

The liquid chocolate is then poured into moulds and formed into bars or any other shape.

==== Chocolate crumb ====
This is the original method developed by Daniel Peter to make milk chocolate. It consists of mixing cocoa liquor with sweetened condensed milk and drying it into a hard, dry, brittle powder resembling bread crumbs. The powder is then liquefied again with additional cocoa butter, and the resulting paste undergoes refining and conching.

British milk chocolate derives its characteristic, slightly cooked flavor by using a dehydrated blend of milk, sugar, and cocoa called chocolate crumb. Originally developed because milk production was high during the summer but chocolate demand was highest during the Christmas shopping season, the cocoa and sugar preserve the milk fats better than full-cream milk powder. The process of making chocolate crumb usually produces a Maillard reaction, resulting in a subtle "cooked", caramel flavor.

==== The Hershey process ====
The actual Hershey process is a trade secret, but experts speculate that the milk is partially lipolyzed, producing butyric acid, and then the milk is pasteurized, stabilizing it for use. The resulting milk chocolate has been described by experts as "tangy", "sour", and "acidified".

=== National preferences ===
Milk chocolate developed in different places, using different processes and locally available technology, and the end result is that milk chocolate produced in different countries has different characteristic flavor profiles. For example, British milk chocolate tastes slightly cooked or baked, American milk chocolate tastes more acidic, Swiss milk chocolate has a fresh milk flavor, and Belgian milk chocolate has more cocoa flavor and less milk flavor than the Swiss milk chocolate. This is primarily due to the different approaches to preparing and incorporating milk into the chocolate.

No matter what the flavor is, consumers prefer the style that they are accustomed to and dislike less familiar flavors. Multinational chocolate producers adapt their products to the style preferred locally. When that hasn't been done, the product generally sells poorly. For example, the Hershey process gives that brand's milk chocolate a particular taste, which is common and expected in the US, so some rival manufacturers now add butyric acid to their milk chocolates. Cadbury's attempted to introduce their Cadbury Dairy Milk recipe, using the chocolate crumb process, to the former East Germany, which was accustomed to the flavor profile of milk chocolate made from powdered milk, and to the US, which was accustomed to the flavor profile of milk chocolate made through the Hershey's process, and in both cases the unfamiliar flavor proved less popular than they expected.

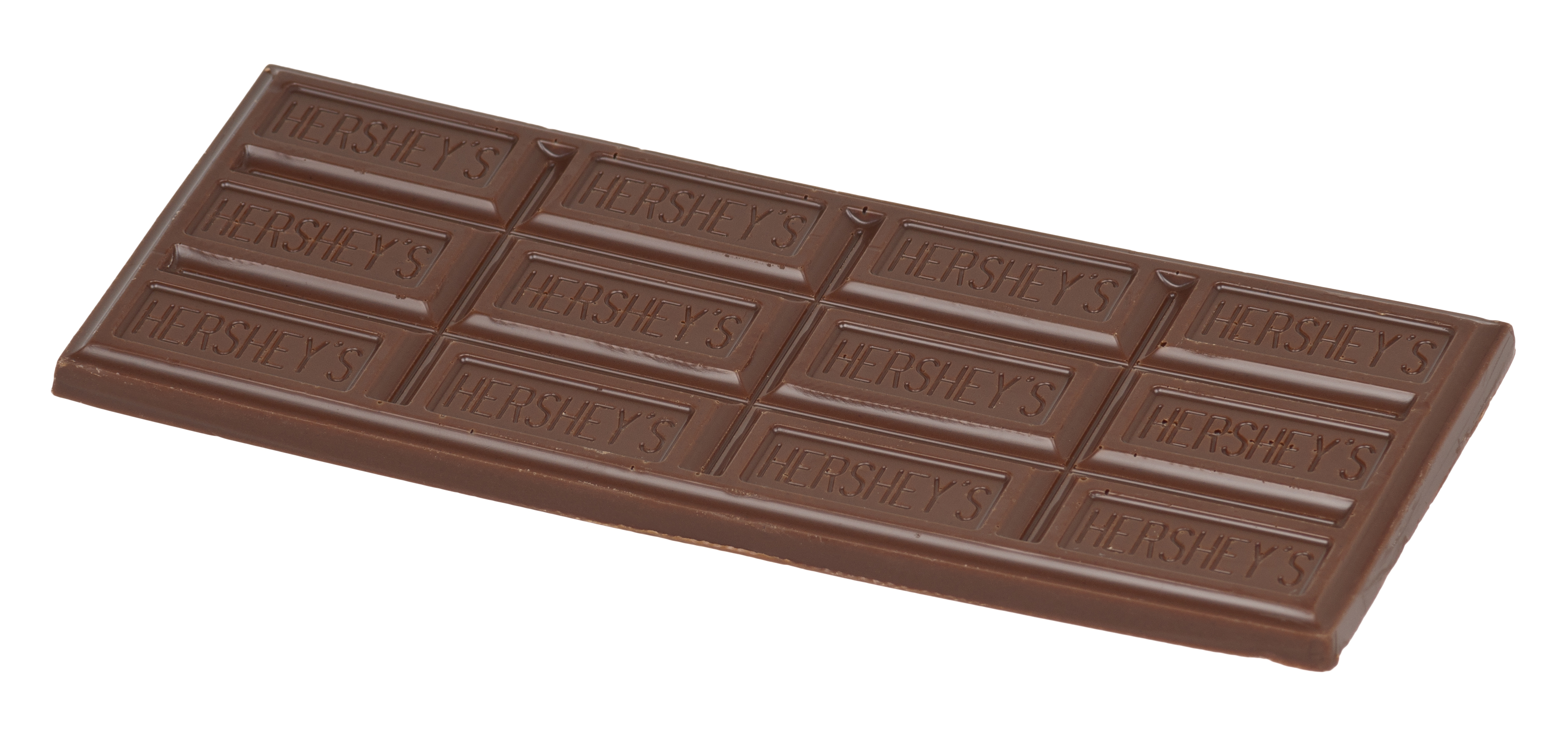
A Hershey bar

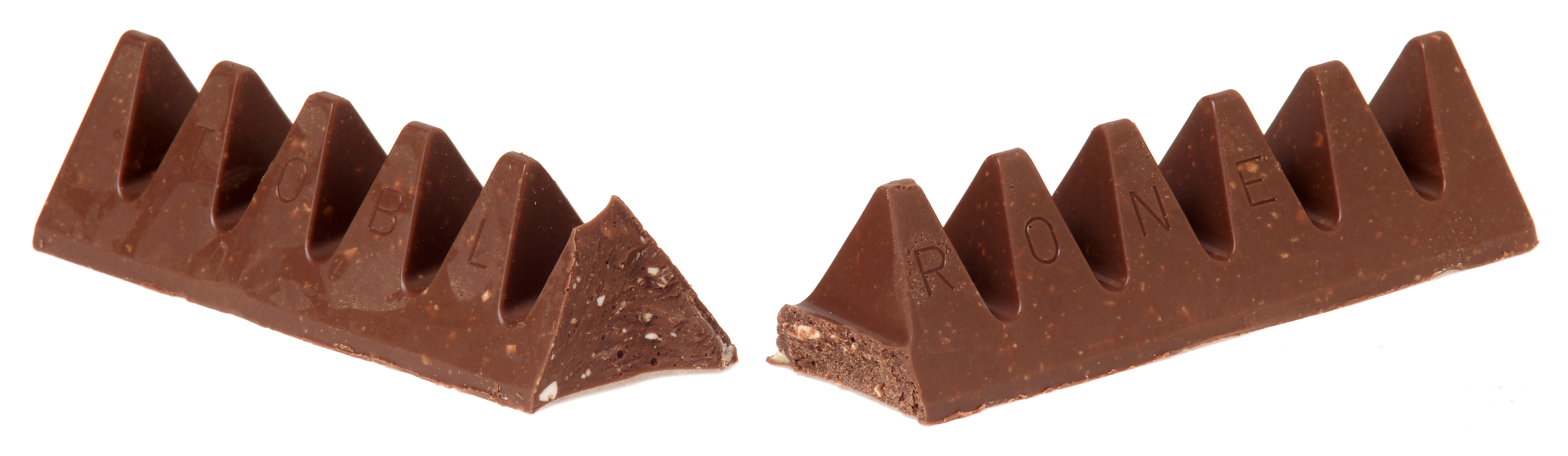
A Toblerone bar

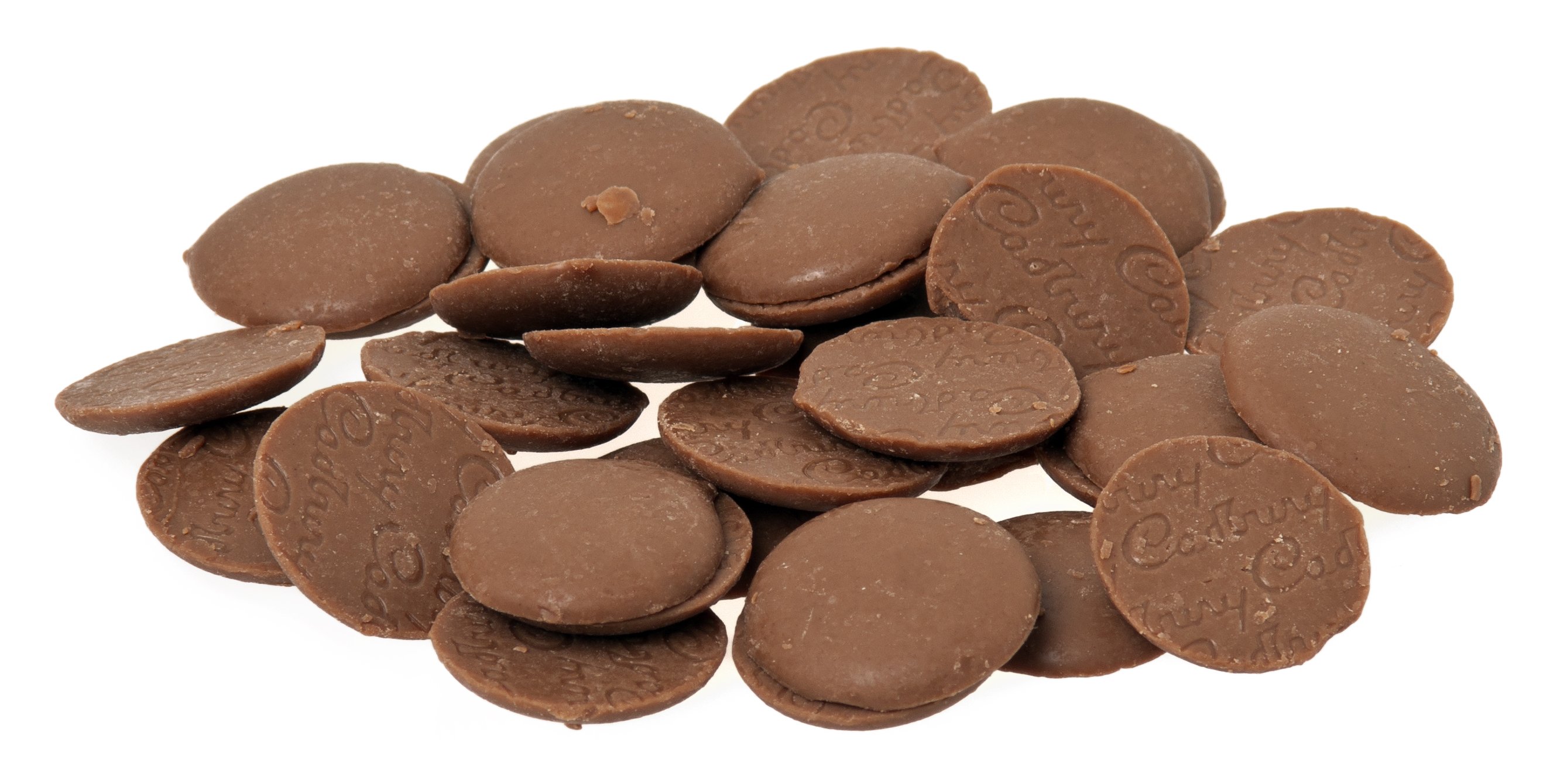
Cadbury Dairy Milk Buttons

== Use ==
Milk chocolate is used in fewer recipes than dark chocolate, as it contributes less cocoa flavor and is harder to work with.

== Milk chocolate combination bars ==
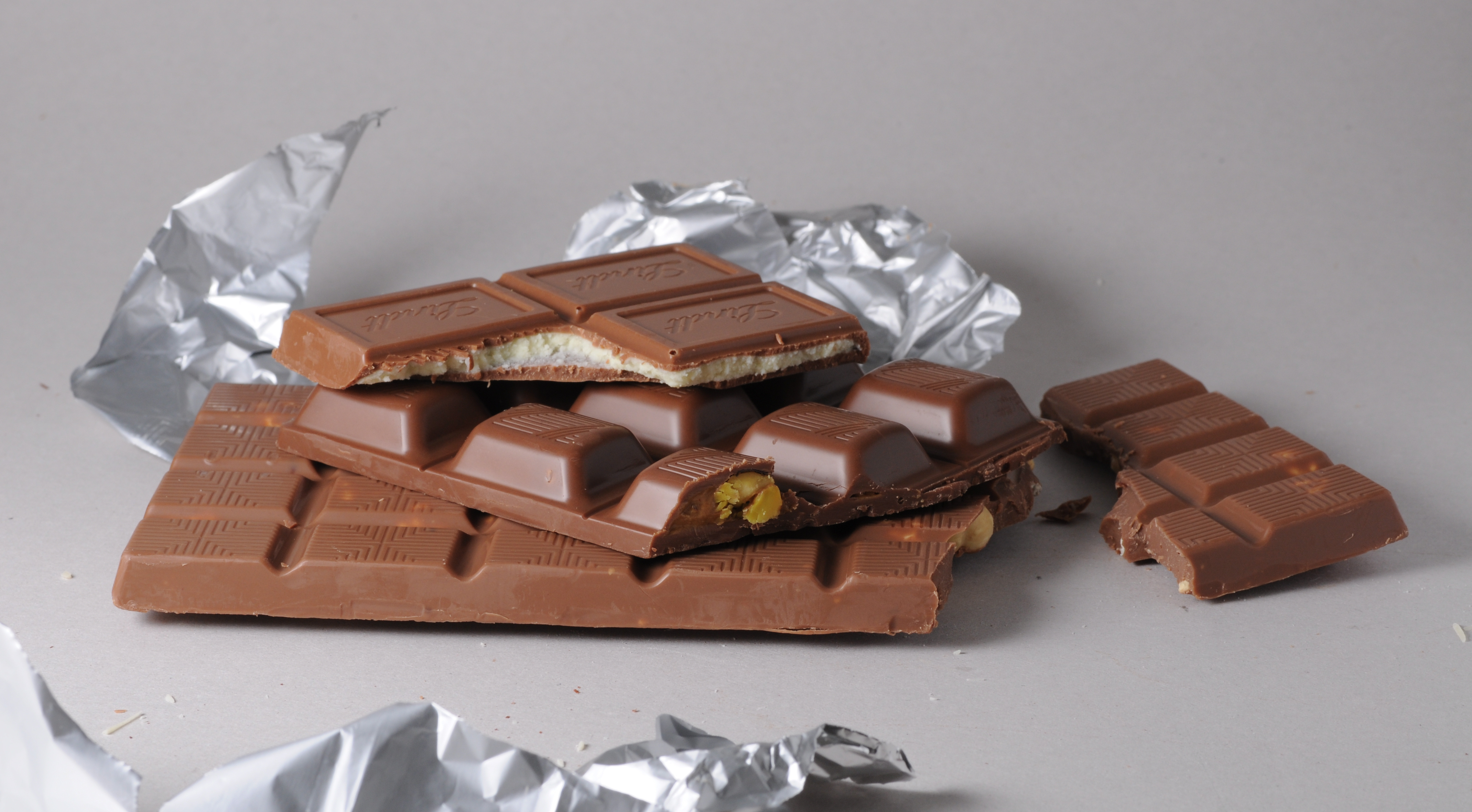
A variety of milk chocolate bars with fillings

At the beginning of the twentieth century, bars which combined milk chocolate with other sweet ingredients appeared on both sides of the Atlantic. In 1904, Cailler launched its Branche, a praline-filled and branch-looking bar. Other Swiss chocolatiers, Theodor Tobler and Emil Baumann, invented Toblerone in 1908 which contained almonds, honey and nougat. In the United States, the Goo Goo Cluster was first introduced in 1912 which added caramel, marshmallow and peanuts to the list of ingredients. These were soon followed, in 1914, by Fry's Turkish Delight in the UK. Shortly afterwards, Clark introduced the Clark Bar, which has been called the first combination bar, in 1917. In 1920, Otto Schnering of the Curtiss Candy Company created the Baby Ruth bar. By 1925, it was the most popular bar in the US. Soon afterwards, two other brands that would become global giants followed, the Mars Bar in 1932 and, three years later, Rowntree's introduced the Kit Kat. By 2014, 650 Kit Kat bars were being consumed each second. Combination bars came to dominate the confectionery market with sales surpassing $140 billion in 2018. As of 2023, milk chocolate was most commonly paired globally with caramel flavours and almonds.

== Ethical issues ==
Ethical issues have been intrinsically linked to chocolate in general since the early days. Many of the early chocolatiers, including Cadbury, Fry's, Rowntree's and Terry's, were founded by Quakers who saw the wellbeing of their workers part of their business ethic. The companies were pioneers in social welfare, providing a safe working environment, high quality housing and other benefits to employees that were ahead of many of the industrial norms. Cadbury, for example, provided paid holidays, insurance and night schools for workers, as well as constructing Bournville in Birmingham, UK. However, the working conditions of many in the wider chocolate supply chain remained poor. Slavery, and later bonded labour, was often employed on the plantations that provided the sugar used to make chocolate. Even after the abolition of slavery, the working conditions in many plantations was still poor, with child labour being frequent and unreported. In 1975, the first in a series of International Cocoa Agreements tried to set what were termed "fair labour conditions" and eliminate child labour.

Rising consumer awareness, as well as greater corporate and employee interest, led to increasing voluntary action to address human rights issues. Fundamental to this has been the rise of Fair Trade and UTZ Certified chocolate. Initially launched by Stichting Max Havelaar in the Netherlands in 1988, the Fair Trade movement expanded into the mainstream in the following decades, with cocoa second to coffee in terms of sales and volume by 2011. Much of this is driven by the use of Fair Trade ingredients by major brands. For example, in Germany, major supermarket Lidl commenced promoting their own brand milk chocolate with their own Fair Trade label in 2006. Similarly, in the UK, two of the best selling milk chocolate bars, Cadburys Dairy Milk and Nestlé's Kit Kat were marketed with a Fair Trade label starting in 2009 and 2010 respectively.
