= Chocolate milk =

Sweetened chocolate-flavoured milk

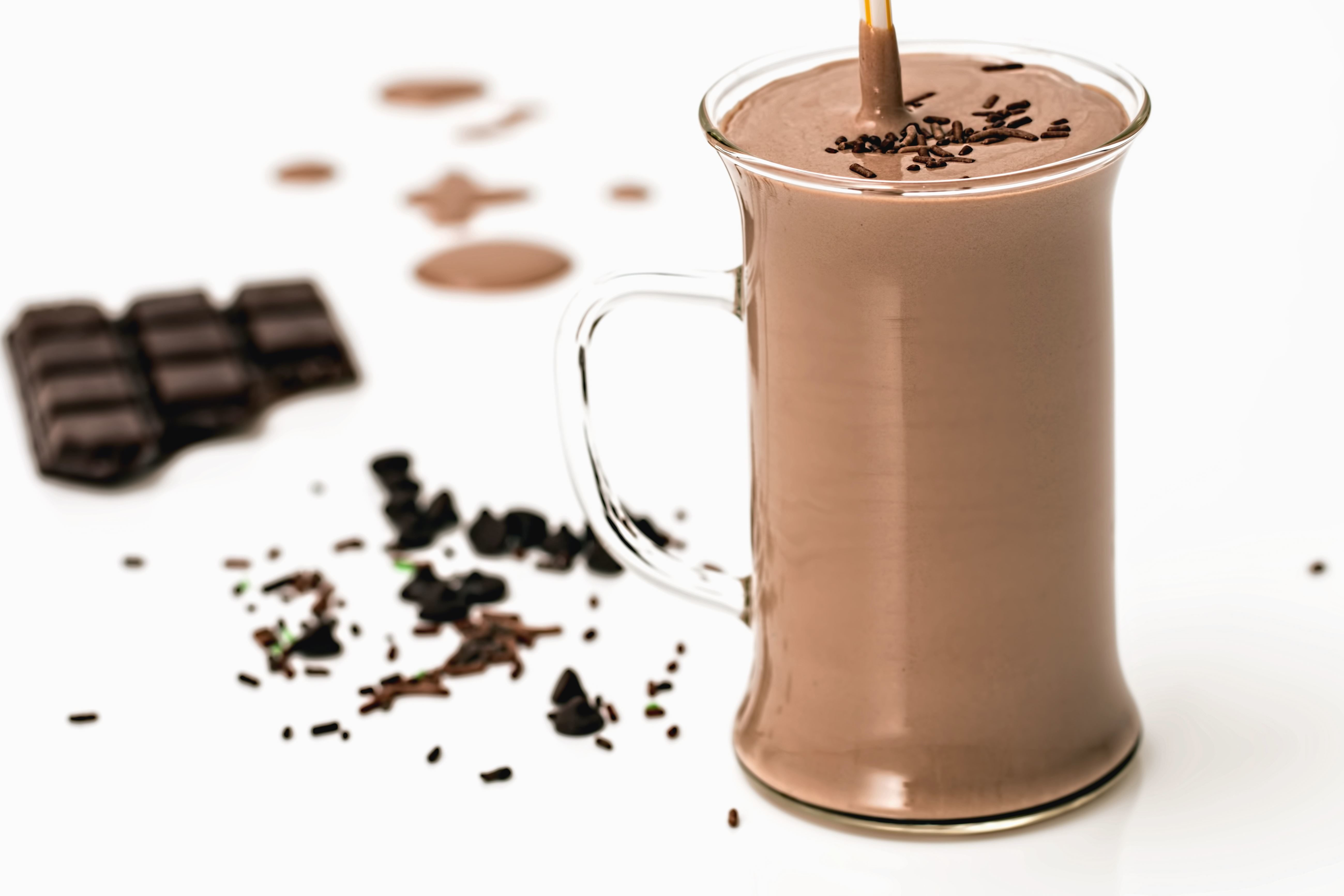
- A mug of chocolate milk next to a chocolate bar
- Type: Flavoured milk
- Origin: Colony of Jamaica (present day Jamaica)
- Introduced: c. 17th century (by Hans Sloane)
- Colour: Brown
- Ingredients: Cocoa or chocolate and milk; optionally sugar or substitute sweeteners and fat
- Related products: Hot chocolate

Chocolate milk is a type of flavoured milk made by mixing cocoa powder with milk (either dairy or plant-based). It is a food pairing in which the milk's mouthfeel masks the dietary fibres of the (non-fat) cocoa solids of cocoa powder.

== Types ==
The liquid carbohydrates in milks like cow milk, or oat milk, may be sufficient on its own to mask the bitterness from the cacao's theobromine. However, most often additional sweeteners are added to make the drink taste sweet.

However, the particles from cocoa solids in homemade chocolate milk will quickly sediment to the bottom. So the solution should be shaken or stirred before consumption to avoid uneven concentration. This is not a problem in some ready to drink chocolate milks.

=== Chocolate milk ===
Beverages, chocolate-flavored drink, whey- and milk-based
Nutritional value per 244 g (one cup)
- Energy: 500 kJ (120 kcal)
- Carbohydrates: 26.1 g
- Sugars: 21.2 g
- Dietary fiber: 1.46 g
- Other constituents: Quantity
- Water: 214 g
- Caffeine: 2.44 mg
- Theobromine: 122 mg
- Link to USDA Database entry
- ^{†}Percentages estimated using US recommendations for adults.

Sugar used in commercial chocolate milk serves as a preservative, and the energy from the sugar also makes it a convenience food. It can also be made at home by blending milk with cocoa powder and a sweetener (such as sugar or a sugar substitute), melted chocolate, chocolate syrup, or a pre-made powdered chocolate milk mix. Other ingredients, such as starch, salt, carrageenan, vanilla, or artificial flavoring are sometimes added. To add nutritional value to the product, sometimes some minerals like zinc oxide or iron are added.

In New York City, school food officials report that nearly 60 percent of the 100 million cartons served each year contain fat-free chocolate milk.

==== Negative health impact ====
Some nutritionists have criticized chocolate milk for its high sugar content and its relationship to childhood obesity. Because chocolate milk can contain twice as much sugar as plain low-fat milk from added sugars, some school districts have stopped serving the product altogether.

=== Dark chocolate milk ===
Dark chocolate milk has more cocoa solids than conventional chocolate milk. However, added sugar can still contribute to health problems.

== Source ==
=== Drink mix ===
Drink mixes of cocoa powder and a sweetener can be either homemade or commercially manufactured.

Chocolate syrup is also frequently used to create chocolate milk.

=== Ready to drink ===
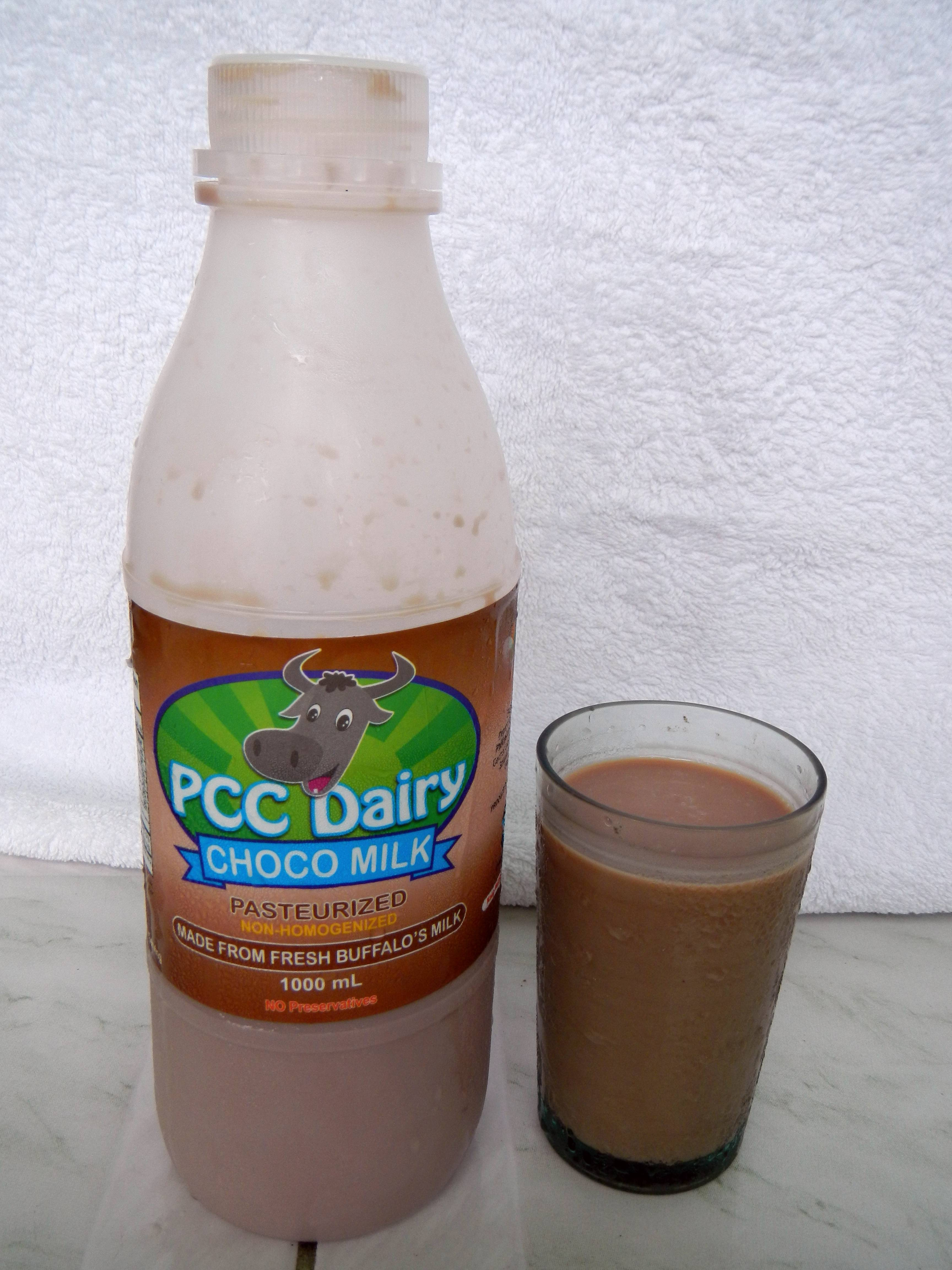
A glass of pasteurized chocolate milk made from water buffalo's milk produced by the Philippine Carabao Center

Ready to drink chocolate milk is produced by homogenization.

At or below room temperature, chocolate is a solid, which does not dissolve, but instead remains a powdered solid suspended in milk. The suspension must be stabilized, otherwise, the powder will settle. Separation can be slowed by any of the following:

- Reduce particle size, for example by tempering chocolate
- Reduce particle density, by incorporating air pockets
- Increase the viscosity of the milk, by adding thickening agents

Carrageenan is used at very low concentrations to form an imperceptible weak gel that prevents the large, dense particles of chocolate from sedimentation.

Ready to drink chocolate milk should be refrigerated like unflavored milk, except some ultra-high temperature (UHT) pasteurized drinks, which can be stored at room temperature. However, it is generally served cold. The nutritional qualities of chocolate milk are the subject of debate: while some studies criticize the high sugar content of chocolate milk, other studies suggest that chocolate milk is nutritionally superior to white.

==== Disadvantage ====
Ready to drink chocolate milk contains fewer antioxidants, caffeine, etc., due to oxidation from the water in the milk.

== Studies and research ==
A number of studies have been issued in regard to chocolate milk nutrition. A 2005 study by the New York City Department of Education found that by removing whole milk and replacing it with low-fat or fat-free chocolate milk, students were served an estimated 5,960 fewer calories and 619 fewer grams of fat per year. However, more recent studies show that fat-free and low-fat milk may actually increase body fat and contribute to obesity. Whole milk may in fact be healthier for obese children than low-fat or non-fat milk.

An April 2007 study from Loughborough University indicated that low-fat milk was an effective rehydration drink.

A November 2009 study conducted by scientists in Barcelona, Spain, suggests that regularly consuming skimmed milk with cocoa rich in flavonoids may reduce inflammation and slow or prevent the development of atherosclerosis. The study notes that its effects are not as pronounced as seen in consumption of red wine. However, in a single serving of cocoa, other researchers found 611 milligrams of gallic acid equivalents (GAE) and 564 milligrams of epicatechin equivalents (ECE), compared with 340 milligrams of GAE and 163 milligrams of ECE in red wine, and 165 milligrams of GAE and 47 milligrams of ECE in green tea.

A study published in 2009 compared chocolate milk to a commercial recovery beverage (matched for carbohydrate and protein content) administered to cyclists after intense workouts. The researchers found no difference in post-workout plasma creatine kinase levels and muscle soreness, nor in cycling time to exhaustion. However, since chocolate milk is usually less expensive than commercial recovery beverages, the researchers concluded that chocolate milk "serves as a more convenient, cheaper ... recovery beverage option for many athletes".

A May 2010 sports nutrition study concluded that "exercise recovery during short-term periods of heavy soccer training appears to be similar when isocaloric CM (Chocolate Milk) and CHO (Carbohydrate) beverages are consumed post-exercise".

Yet another study in 2011 at Kean University in New Jersey concluded similar results in male soccer players, discovering that there was an increase in time to fatigue when chocolate milk was consumed. The Kean University study also viewed chocolate milk's effects on female soccer players undergoing morning and afternoon practices during preseason. They were either given the carbohydrate-electrolyte beverage or chocolate milk between morning and afternoon preseason practices. Following every afternoon practice, each athlete completed a shuttle run to fatigue. The study concluded that chocolate milk is just as beneficial as the carbohydrate-electrolyte beverage in promoting recovery in women.

=== Calcium oxalate production ===
Chocolate has oxalic acid, which reacts with the calcium in the milk producing calcium oxalate, thus preventing the calcium from being absorbed in the intestine. However, it is present in small enough amounts that the effect on calcium absorption is negligible (2–3%). As chocolate contains relatively small amounts of oxalate, it is unclear to what extent chocolate consumption affects healthy people with calcium-rich diets.

In a 2008 study, participants who consumed one or more servings of chocolate on a daily basis had lower bone density and strength than those participants who ate a serving of chocolate six times a week or less. Researchers believe this may be due to oxalate inhibiting calcium absorption – but it could also be due to sugar content in chocolate, which may increase calcium excretion. It is clear, however, that consuming foods high in oxalate – and in turn their effect on calcium absorption – is a more significant concern for people with oxalate kidney stones, which occur when there is too much oxalate in the urine. These people especially should reduce their oxalate intake and increase their calcium intake. However, the high magnesium content in chocolate is likely to reduce the risk of stone formation, because like citrate, magnesium is also an inhibitor of urinary crystal formation.

== History ==
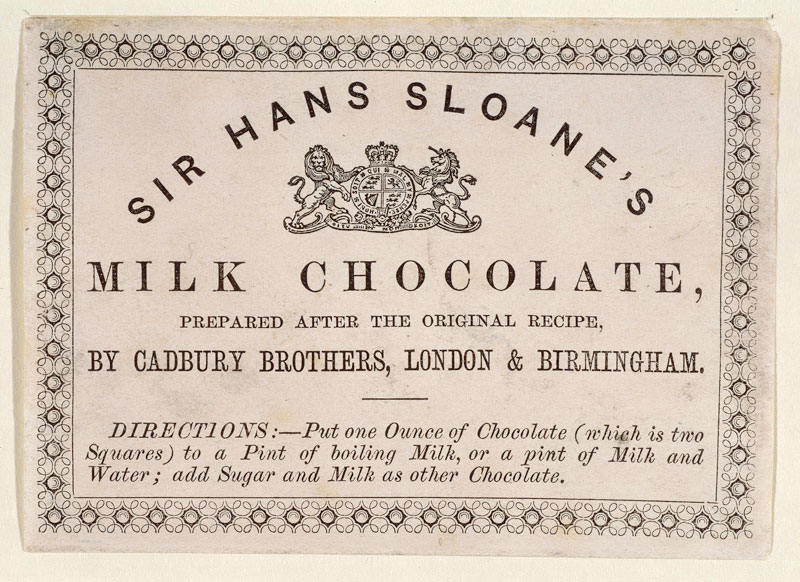
Chocolate milk recipe in the 1850s

Milk has probably been added to chocolate drinks wherever both ingredients were available. The first domesticated cattle were introduced to the Caribbean in 1493 by Christopher Columbus. Reciprocally, cocoa was introduced in Europe in the 1520s. The Natural History Museum of London lists Anglo-Irish botanist Hans Sloane as the inventor of drinking chocolate with milk. Sloane found the local Jamaican beverage consisting of cacao and water served to him in Jamaica unpalatable, but by adding milk to it, found it not as unacceptable as it was. However, according to historian James Delbourgo, the Jamaicans were brewing "a hot beverage brewed from shavings of freshly harvested cacao, boiled with milk and cinnamon" as far back as 1494.

In the late 19th century, Swiss entrepreneur Daniel Peter developed a solid dehydrated version of chocolate milk so that it could be easily portioned, transported and conserved (fresh milk was rare in the cities). He eventually created milk chocolate in 1875.

== See also ==
- Coffee milk
- Flavored milk
- List of chocolate drinks
- Milkshake
- Sipahh
- Chocomel
