= British Library Leyden Medical Dissertations Collection =

Collection of medical dissertations

The British Library Leyden Medical Dissertations Collection is a collection of medical dissertations submitted to Dutch universities at Amsterdam, Utrecht, Harlingen, and Leyden. It includes, in particular, a fine set of Leyden medical dissertations and disputations for the period 1593 to 1746. The collection is in 53 volumes, all bound in white vellum, with 20 to 75 documents in each volume. The collection was formed principally by Hans Sloane.
