= Chocomel =

Dutch brand of chocolate-flavoured milk

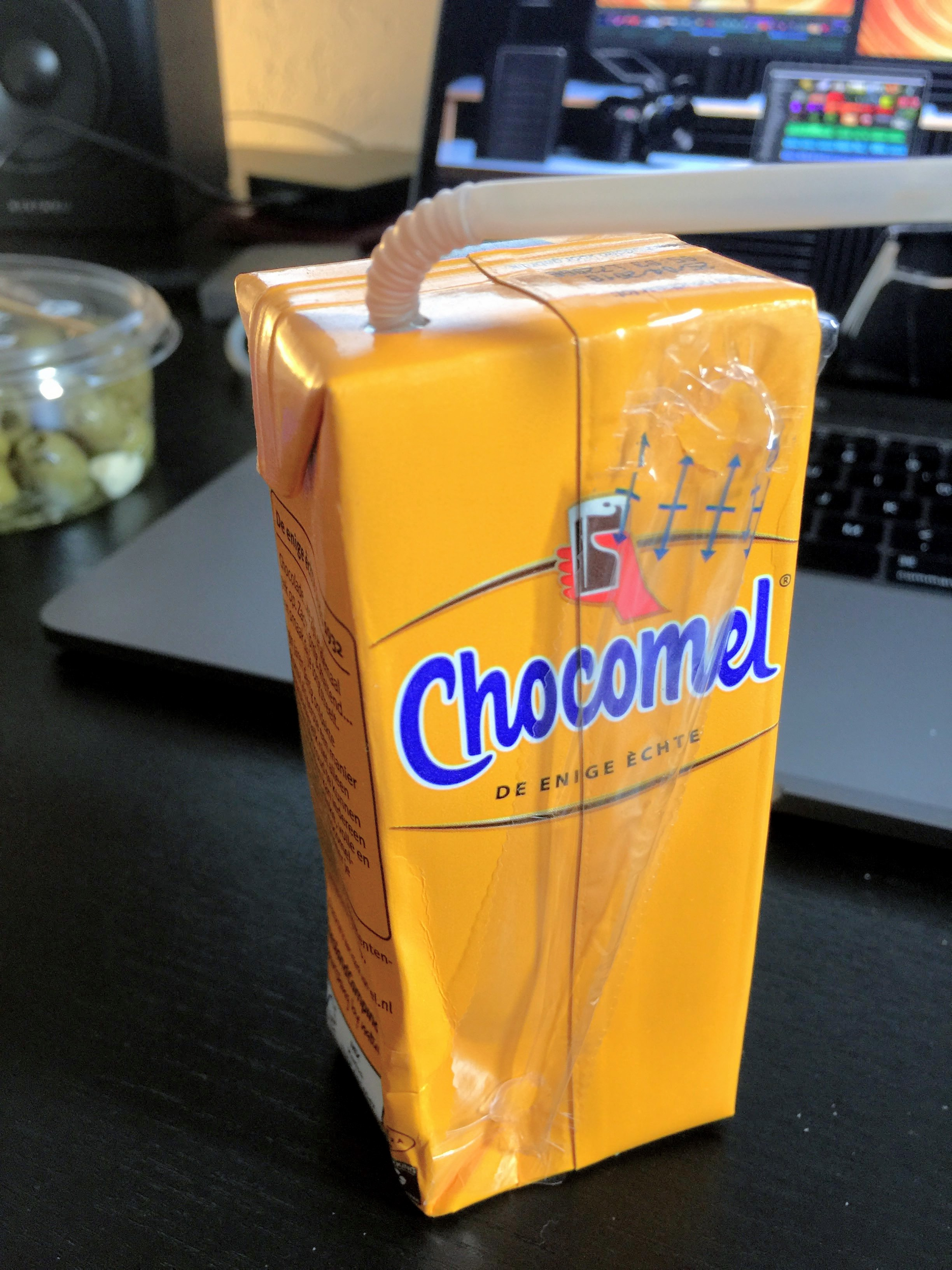
Chocomel in a carton package

Chocomel (until 2026 known as Cécémel in Belgium) is a Dutch brand of chocolate-flavoured milk, produced by FrieslandCampina in Aalter, Belgium. The brand's trademark is owned by FrieslandCampina.

== History ==
It was formerly produced by Nutricia in Zoetermeer and Riedel Drinks. Chocomel is widely available in the Netherlands, Germany, United Kingdom and Belgium (under the name of Cécémel). There are five varieties of Chocomel. Campina stopped producing a Mokka (mocha) flavor in 2011 and introduced the Vers (fresh, refrigerated) varieties in 2015. Chocomel is also available in pod form for the Philips/Douwe Egberts Senseo coffee brewing system. The drink's slogan is "De Enige Echte" (in Dutch), which means "The One And Only".

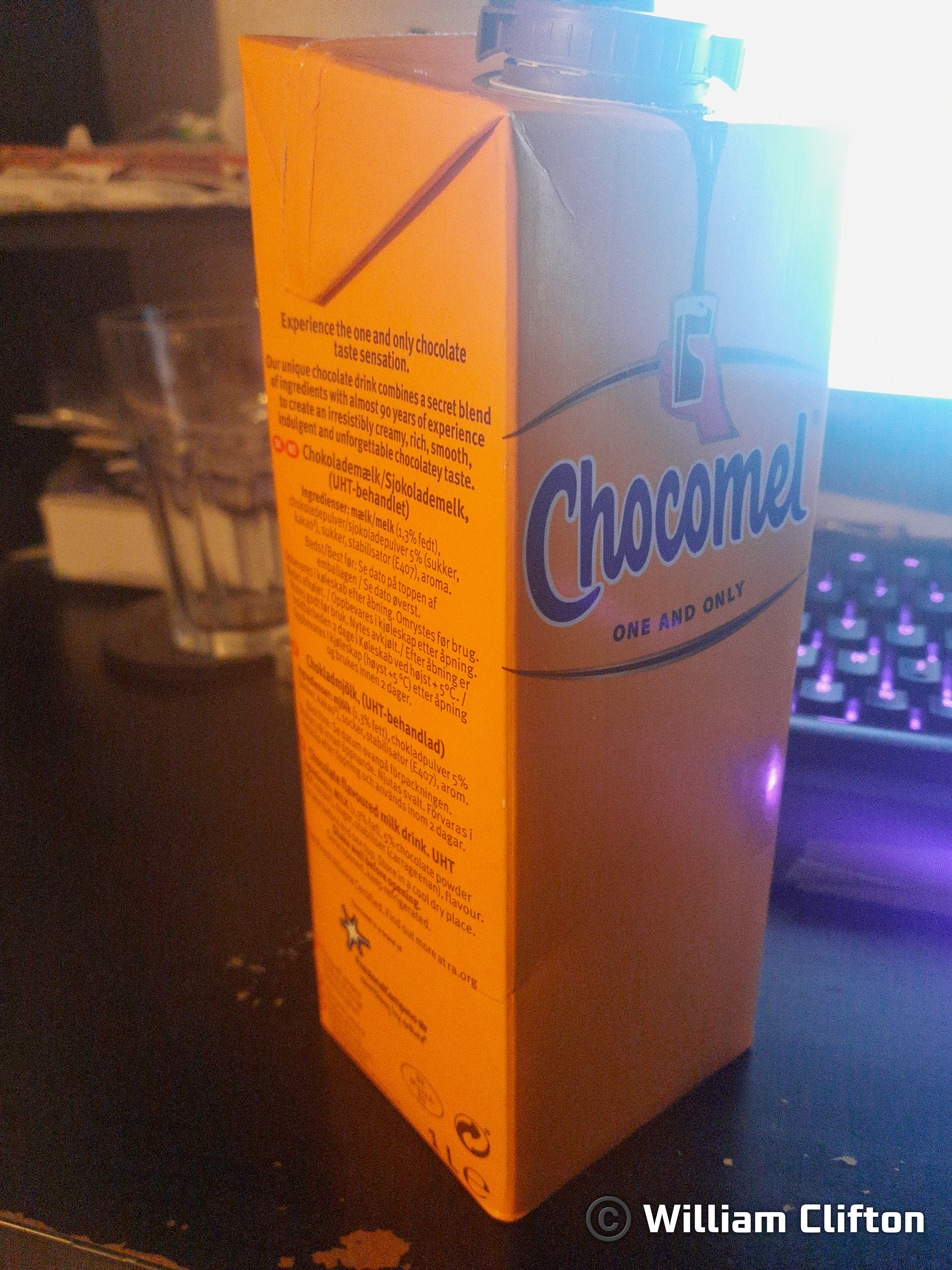
Picture of a 1 L carton of "Chocomel" brand chocolate milk. Ingredients are listed out in Danish/Norwegian, Swedish and English with the manufacturer country code of "BE".

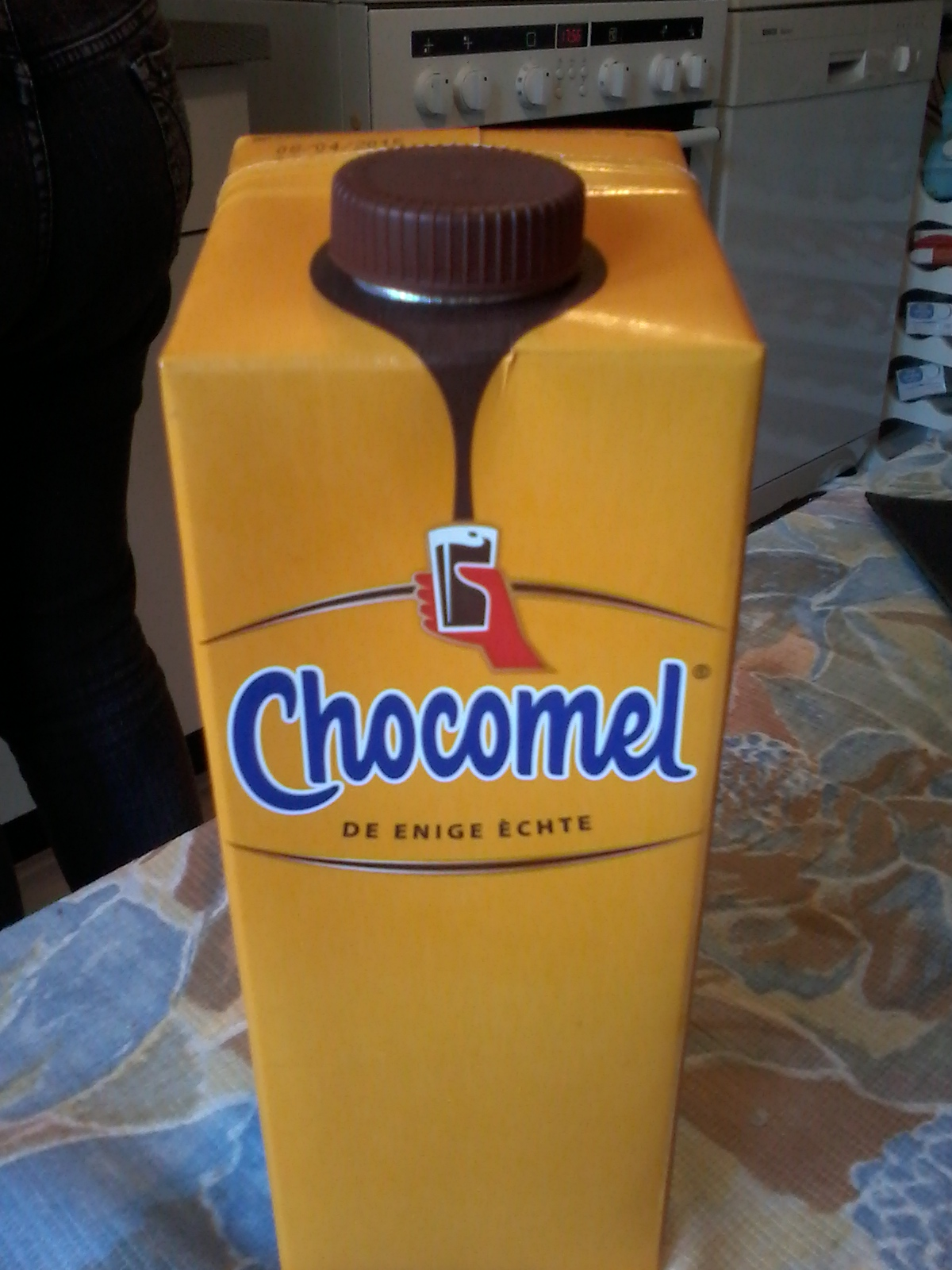
Chocomel packaging in Dutch language

== See also ==
- List of chocolate beverages
