= Jordan & Timaeus =

Former German chocolate company

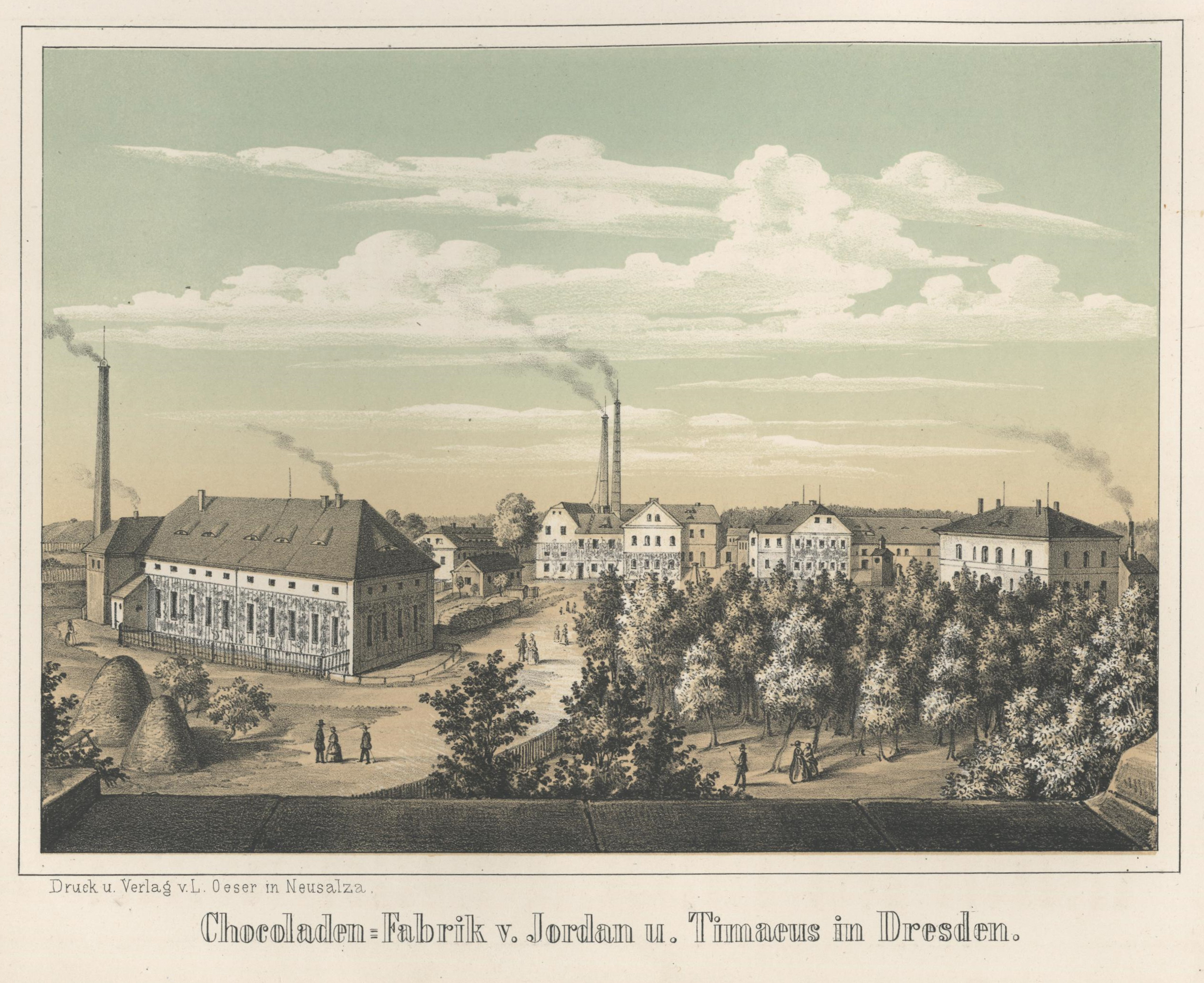
Chocolate Factory of Jordan and Timaeus in Dresden (1856)

Jordan & Timaeus was a Saxon chocolate company established in 1823 by Gottfried Jordan and August Friedrich Timaeus, based in Dresden, Germany.

== History ==
=== Gottfried Jordan ===
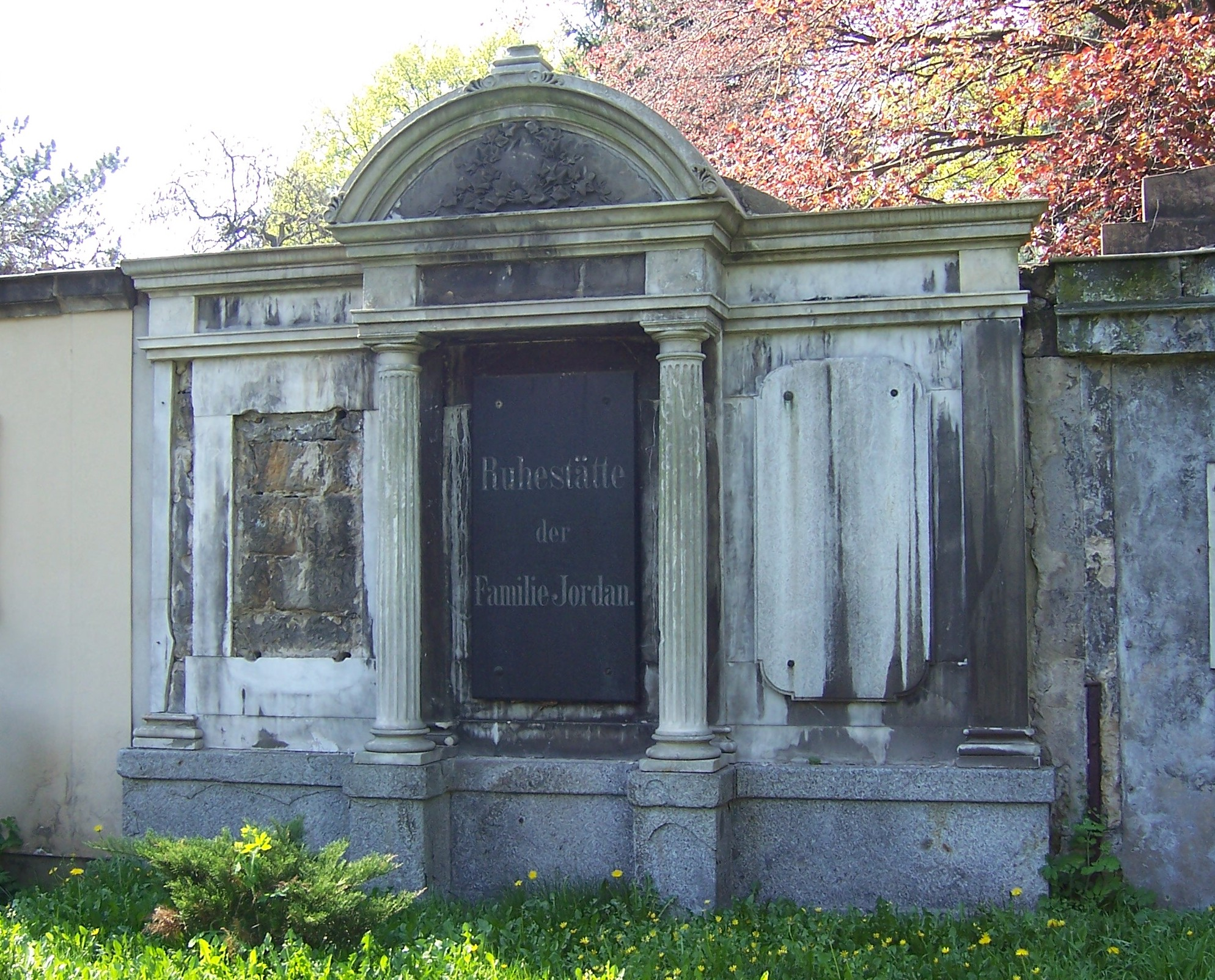
Grave of Jordan in Dresden

Gottfried Heinrich Christoph Jordan (May 9, 1791, in Hasserode – October 2, 1860, in Dresden) was a Saxon businessman.

Jordan initially worked together with August Friedrich Timaeus as a traveling salesman for companies in Braunschweig. In 1823, Jordan and Timaeus founded the chocolate and cichorium factory Jordan & Timaeus between today's Timaeus and Jordan streets east of Königsbrücker Straße in Dresden- Antonstadt. They produced chicory coffee, pasta and chocolate. The company quickly became one of the largest in Dresden.

In 1836, Jordan participated in the founding of the Waldschlösschen Brewery, one of the first joint stock companies in Germany. From 1842 to 1848 he was Deputy Member of the Saxon Landtag.

Jordan was buried in the Inner Neustädter cemetery. In Dresden, the Jordan Road is named after him.

His son Ernst Albert Jordan later took over the company. He was also a member of the Saxon Landtag and became an honorary citizen of the city of Dresden.

=== August Friedrich Timaeus ===
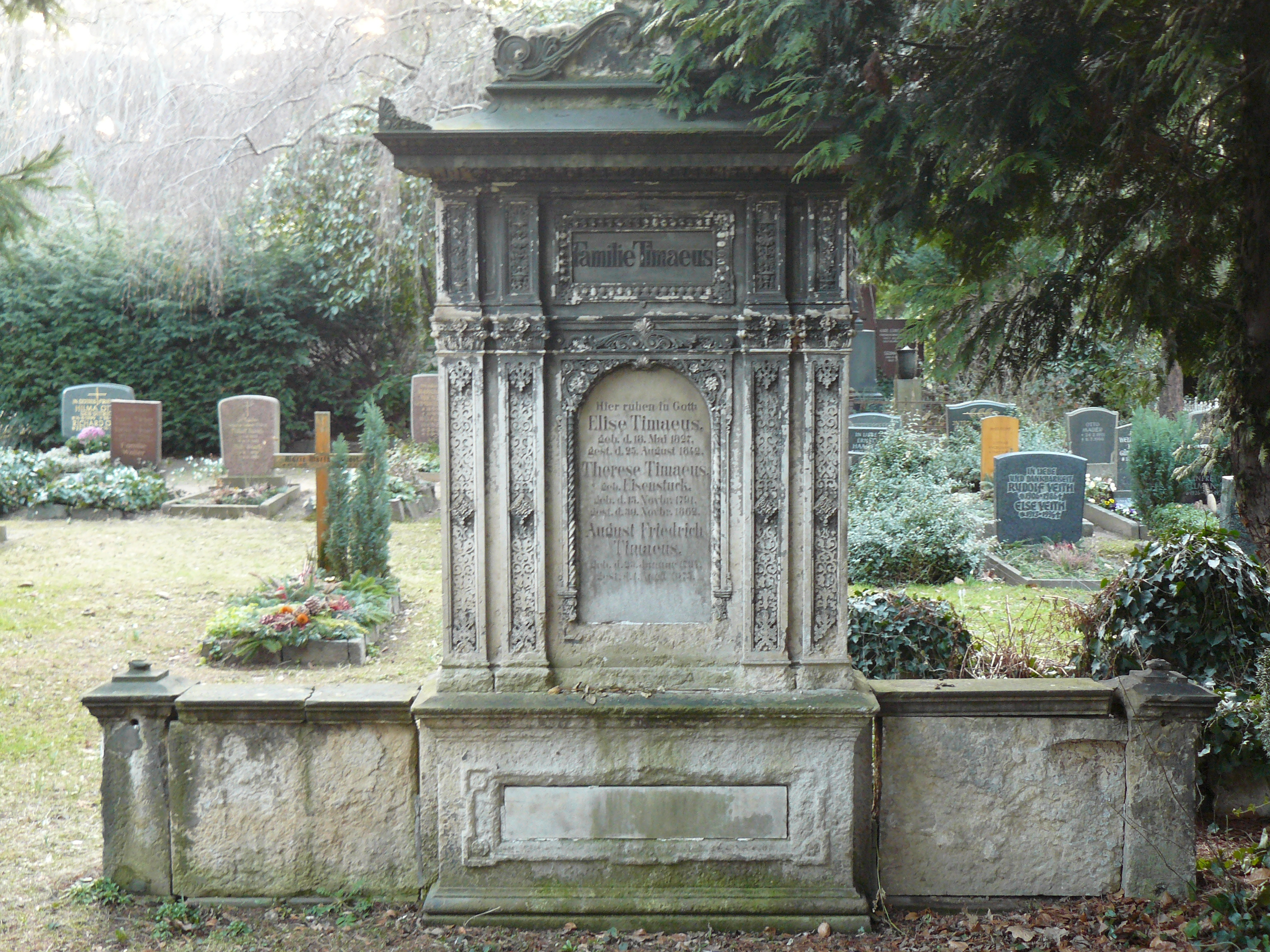
Gravestone of Timaeus on the inner Neustädter cemetery

August Friedrich Christian Timaeus (also: Friedrich August Timaeus ) (January 23, 1794, in Celle – April 1, 1875, in Dresden) was a German businessman.

August Friedrich Timaeus attended high school in his hometown Celle. From 1809 to 1814 he completed a commercial apprenticeship in a materials store in Wolfenbüttel. He then worked until 1817 in Braunschweig in a "drugstore" and until 1823 for the Gebrüder Reiners in Brunswick as Kontorist and commercial traveler. He met Gottfried Jordan, with whom he founded the chocolate and cichoric factory Jordan & Timaeus in Dresden in 1823.

In 1830, the entrepreneurs set up a steam engine. The company quickly became one of the largest in Dresden and one of the most important chocolate manufacturers in Germany.

In 1853, Timaeus retired from the business.

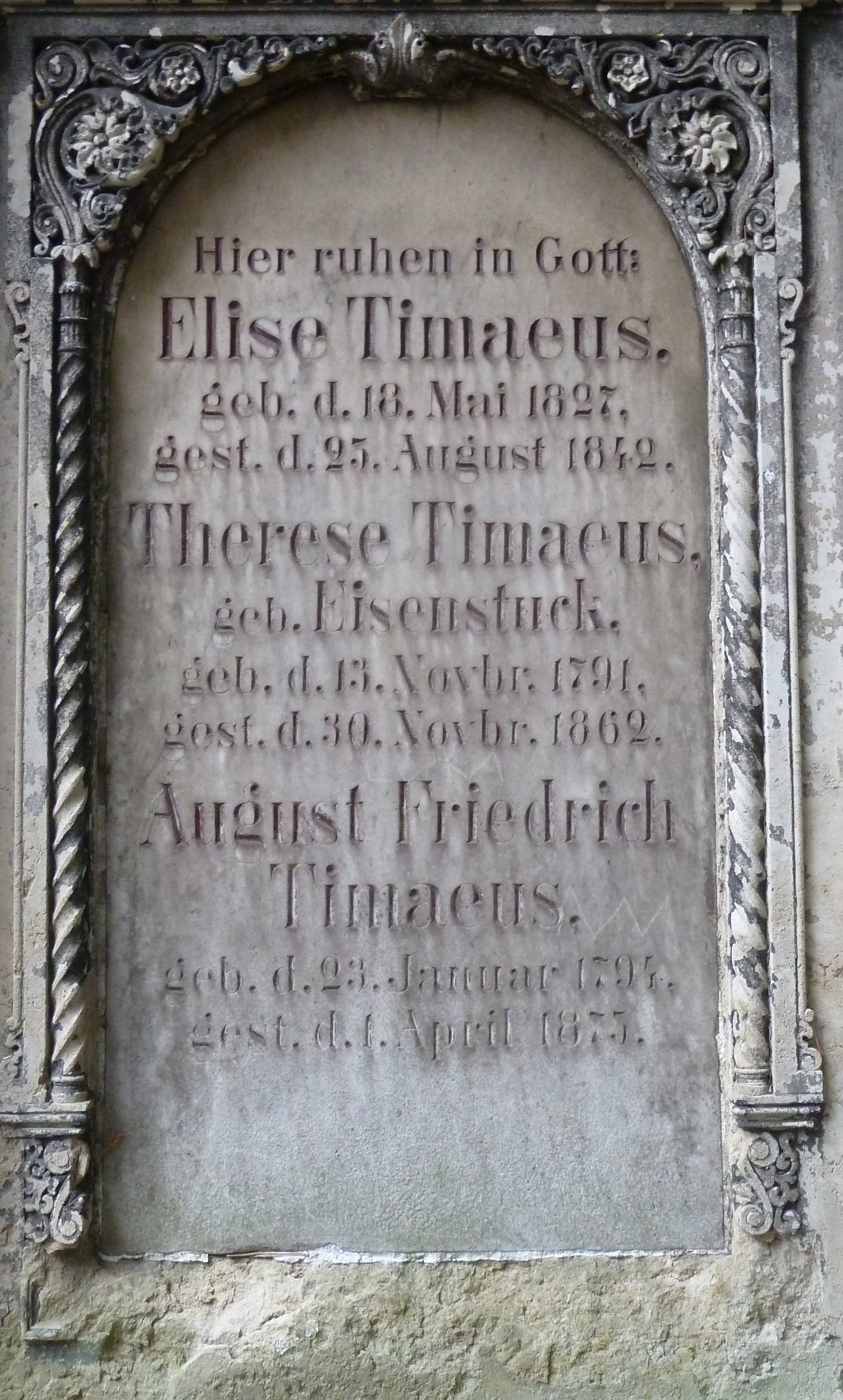
Gravestone of August Friedrich Timaeus on the inner Neustädter cemetery (2nd field, G) in Dresden

August Friedrich Timaeus died in 1875 and was buried in the Inner Neustädter cemetery (2nd Land, G). In Dresden, the Timaeusstraße was named after him.

The listed Timaeusvilla, a former headquarters of Jordan & Timaeus, is still in the backyard of Alaunstraße 71b in Dresden.

=== Jordan & Timaeus (1823–1930) ===
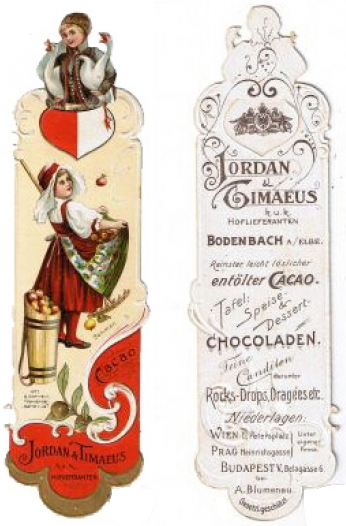
Artful bookmark of Jordan & Timaeus (early 20th century)

Founded in 1823 by Gottfried Jordan and August Friedrich Timaeus. This factory was located between today's Timaeus and Jordan streets east of Königsbrücker Straße in Dresden- Antonstadt.

They produced foods such as chicory coffee, pasta and chocolate. On 23 May 1839, they advertised a chocolate containing fresh donkey milk, calling it "steam chocolate", possibly unprecedented, although its exact composition remains unknown (see also §Claims regarding the invention of milk chocolate).

The factory, which initially had to work without a steam engine, expanded year by year. In 1830, the two entrepreneurs were able to set up a steam engine and go to the chocolate factory, where their company gained a worldwide reputation and contributed significantly to push back the consumption of foreign chocolate in Germany in favor of domestic production. Although a conflagration in the late autumn of 1845 destroyed their factory building, their business suffered no permanent disruption. Rather, they expanded it by starting to manufacture winter chocolates and cocoa masses in blackboards after the factory was rebuilt in the winter of 1845–1846, as well as finer chocolates for dessert and snacking, which made them equally successful at home and abroad achieved.

Around 1880, the company had a particularly unusual promotional idea by packing 5 different chocolate bars in a red canvas cassette, which was a deceptively genuine model of a Baedeker travel guide and was distributed as Baedeker's land of milk and honey.

After the founders' deaths, the owners were Ernst Jordan and Eduard, Albert and Gerhard Timaeus.

They have branches abroad in Děčín, Bodenbach, Vienna, Prague and Budapest. In 1874, the total number of employees was around 500.

The owners of Jordan & Timaeus were appointed as royal Saxon court purveyors. Later, the company closed in 1930.

The company in Dresden was nationalized in 1945. In the former Czechoslovakia, the Diana Děčín branch, founded by the Dresden chocolate factory Hartwig & Vogel, continued to produce from 1948 until 1989 when it was bought by the food company Nestlé and closed in 1996. Employees saved knowledge and machines and continued production in the former Jordan & Timaeus Manufactory Jordanka - bývalá čokoládovna (eng. former chocolate factory), Zbrojnická Street 10.

== Claims regarding the invention of milk chocolate ==
In 2011, according to a study by the Dresden-based association of scientists WIMAD and TU Dresden, it was speculated that the first milk chocolate in solid form could have been invented by Jordan & Timaeus. In an attempt to recreate the unknown product advertised as "milk chocolate" in 1839, the researchers concluded that liquid milk could have been incorporated in small amounts into the chocolate paste, without preventing it from solidifying. At the time, chocolate was essentially consumed as a drink. Milk chocolate for eating using dehydrated milk (crumb process) eventually became successful under the Daniel Peter's Chocolate brand in the late 19th century.
