= Chelsea Manor =

16th century manor house in London

Coordinates: 51°29′43″N 0°09′38″W

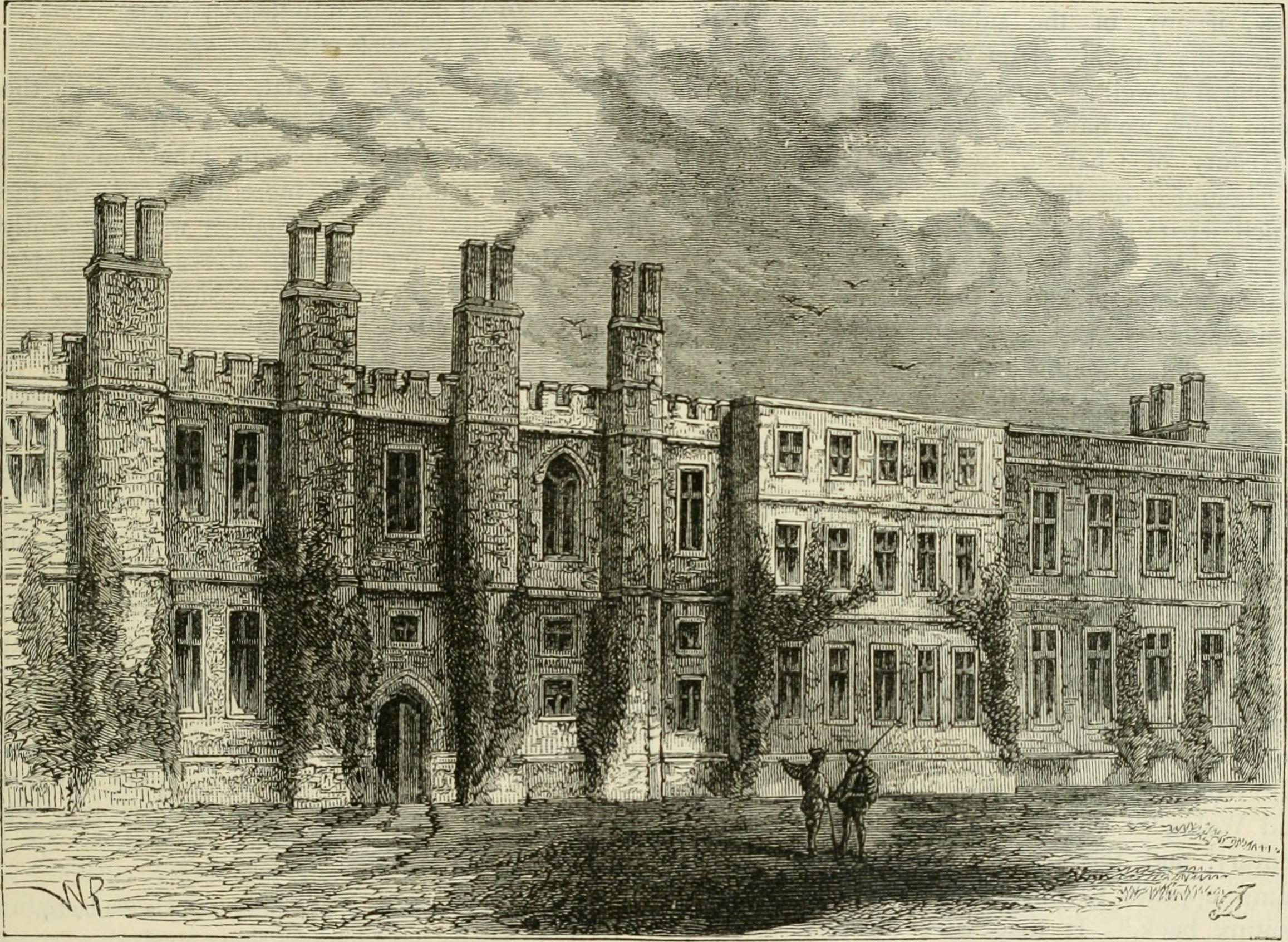
The Tudor House of the old Chelsea Manor

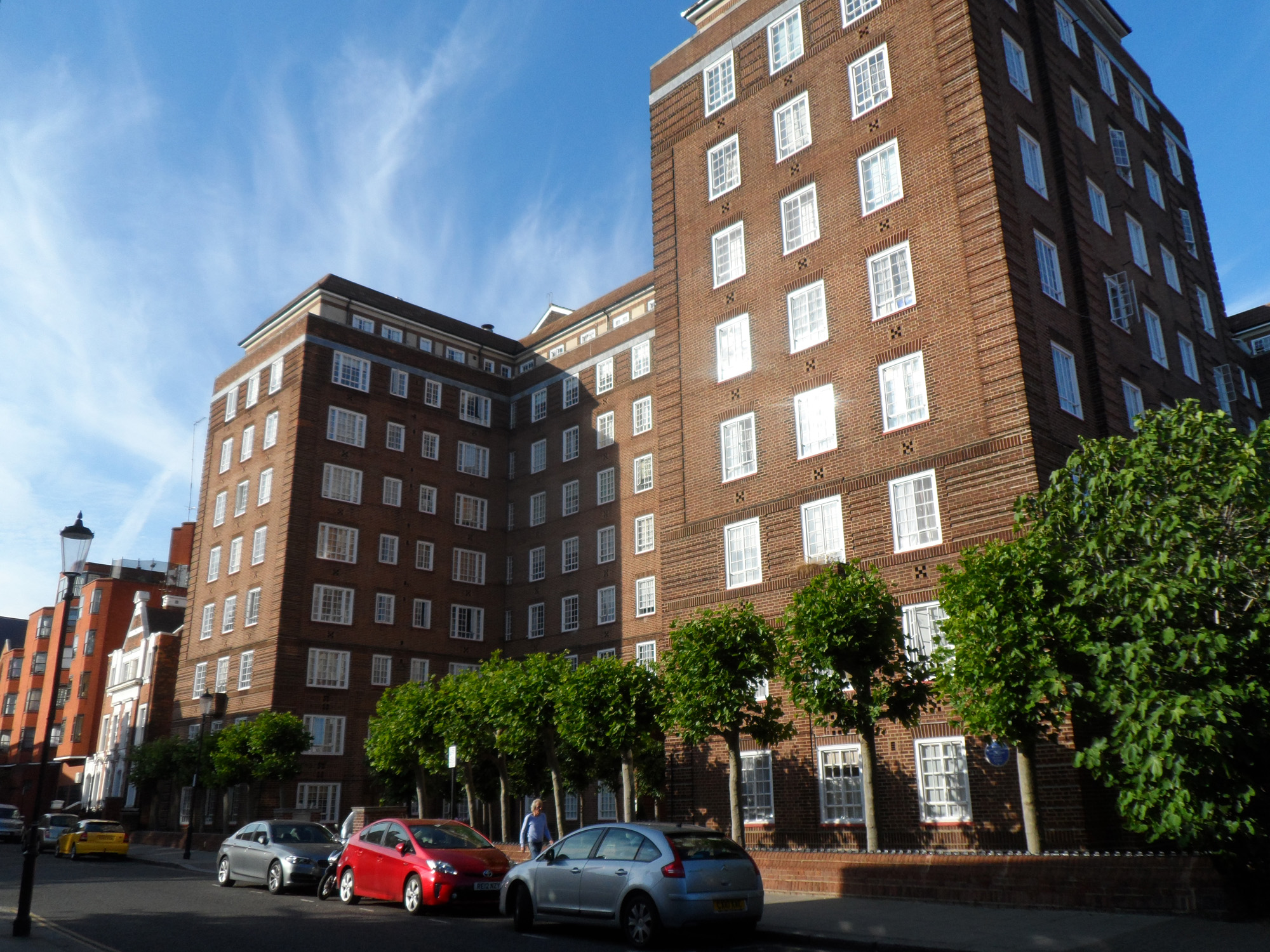
Swan Court on Chelsea Manor Street, site of Chelsea Manor

Chelsea Manor House was once the demesne of the main manor of the medieval parish now roughly commensurate with the district of Chelsea, London. It was a residence acquired by Henry VIII of England in 1536, and was the site of two subsequent houses. Today, the area is covered by residential streets.

== Owner-occupiers ==
In May 1541 Queen Katharine Howard and Princess Elizabeth often travelled by barge to and from Chelsea together.

In 1544, Chelsea was bestowed on Queen Katherine Parr as a lifetime grant, included in her jointure. Katherine was reportedly passionate about gardens and took a keen interest in the gardens of her dower estates, especially those in Chelsea. Following the King's death, she relocated from the court, and she spent a significant amount of time at Chelsea, both as a widow and later as the wife of Sir Thomas Seymour.

It was home to Princess Elizabeth, between 1536 and 1548, and then to Anne of Cleves, who died there in 1557.

Following Queen Katherine's death in 1548, the manor was inhabited by Crown lessees or individuals granted residence by the sovereign until 1638. Among them was John Dudley, Duke of Northumberland, who occupied the manor from 1551 to 1553 and conducted meetings of the King's council in Chelsea.

Jane Guildford, Duchess of Northumberland, successfully petitioned for a grant of Chelsea to her for life, after it had been confiscated by the Crown after her husband, John Dudley, Duke of Northumberland’s attainder.

Other notable Crown lessees were Anne, Duchess of Somerset, until her death in 1587; and from 1591 the Lord High Admiral, Lord Howard of Effingham (later the Earl of Nottingham). His wife, Katherine Carey, was a close friend and relative of the Queen, and, as the Nottinghams resided at Chelsea, Queen Elizabeth made frequent visits to dine with them.

Other famous owners included: the 1st Duke of Hamilton; the 1st Viscount Newhaven; Sir Hans Sloane; and the Lord Bishops of Winchester.

As a Crown possession for a hundred years, the house served as a residence for members of the Royal Family, high-ranking courtiers, and royal ministers, thus establishing Chelsea's prominent status in the area.
