= Hans Sloane =

Anglo-Irish physician, naturalist and collector (1660–1753)

Sir Hans Sloane Bt FRS
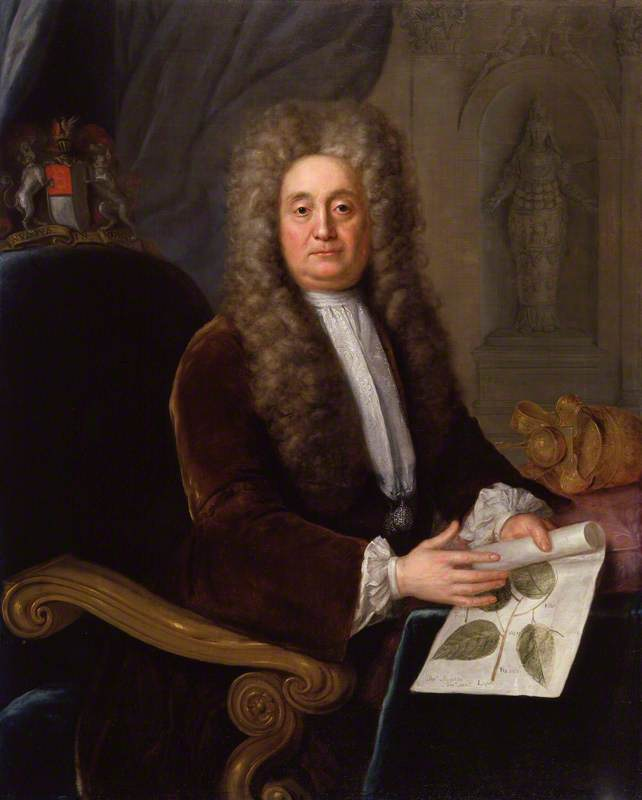
- Portrait by Stephen Slaughter

13th President of the Royal Society
- In office 1727–1741
- Preceded by: Isaac Newton
- Succeeded by: Martin Folkes

President of the Royal College of Physicians
- In office 1719–1735
- Preceded by: John Bateman
- Succeeded by: Thomas Pellett

Personal details
- Born: 16 April 1660 Killyleagh, Ireland
- Died: 11 January 1753 (aged 92) London, England
- Resting place: Chelsea Old Church
- Scientific career
- Known for: Physician; Philanthropist; Entrepreneur; Investor; Chelsea Physic Garden; British Museum; Sloane Square; Sloane's drinking chocolate
- Spouse: Elisabeth Sloane (née Langley)
- Awards: Fellow of the Royal Society (1685)

Sir Hans Sloane, 1st Baronet (16 April 1660 – 11 January 1753) was an Anglo-Irish physician, naturalist, and collector. He had a collection of 71,000 items which he bequeathed to the British nation, this is providing the foundation of the British Museum, the British Library, and the Natural History Museum, London.

Elected to the Royal Society at the age of 24, Sloane travelled to the Caribbean in 1687 and documented his travels and findings with extensive publications years later. Sloane was a renowned medical doctor among the aristocracy, and was elected to the Royal College of Physicians at age 27. Though he is credited with the invention of chocolate milk, it is more likely that he learned the practice of adding milk to drinking chocolate while living and working in Jamaica. Streets and places were later named after him, including Hans Place, Hans Crescent, and Sloane Square in and around Chelsea, London—the area of his final residence—and also Sir Hans Sloane Square in Killyleagh, his birthplace in Ulster.

Sloane's London estate was bequeathed to his daughter, Elizabeth, who was married to the 2nd Baron Cadogan, in which family the estate remains.

== Early life and family ==
Sloane was born into a family of partial Ulster-Scots descent on 16 April 1660 at Killyleagh, a village on the south-western shores of Strangford Lough in County Down in Ulster, the northern province in Ireland. He was the seventh and last child of Alexander Sloane, who died when Hans was six years old. Alexander Sloane was a collector general of taxes for County Down and an agent for the Earl of Clanbrassil. His brother, James Sloane, was a Member of the Irish Parliament. It is said that Sarah Hicks (Hans's mother) was an Englishwoman who moved to Killyleagh as Anne Carey's companion when Anne married Lord Clanbrassil. Sloane's paternal family were Ulster-Scots, having migrated from Ayrshire in the south-west of Scotland; they settled in east Ulster during the Plantation of Antrim and Down, which was slightly separate from the wider Plantation of Ulster, under King James VI and I. The Sloane children, including Hans, were taken up by the Hamilton (or Clanbrassil) family and had much of their early tuition within the Killyleagh Castle library. Out of Alexander's sons, only three reached adulthood: Hans, William, and James. The graveyards of Henry and John Sloane can be found in Killyleagh's churchyard; both brothers died in their childhood. The eldest brother James was elected a Member of Parliament for Roscommon and Killyleagh in 1692. John Sloane later became an MP of Thetford and a barrister of the Inner Temple, spending most of his time in London.

Like many other Scots "Planters" in Ulster during the seventeenth century, the Sloane name was almost certainly of Gaelic origin, Sloane probably being an anglicisation of Ó Sluagháin.

As a youth, Sloane collected objects of natural history and other curiosities. This led him to the study of medicine, which he did in London, where he studied botany, materia medica, surgery and pharmacy. His collecting habits made him useful to John Ray and Robert Boyle. After four years in London he travelled through France, spending some time at Paris and Montpellier, and stayed long enough at the University of Orange-Nassau to take his MD degree there in 1683; he was hired as an assistant to prominent physician Thomas Sydenham who gave the young man valuable introductions to practice. He returned to London with a considerable collection of plants and other curiosities, of which the former were sent to Ray and utilised by him for his History of Plants.

== Voyage to the Caribbean ==
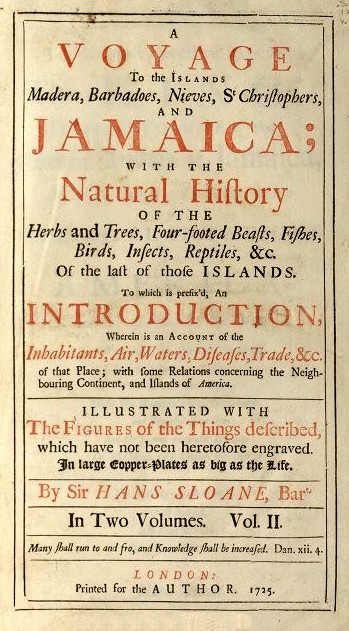
Title page, Sloane's Voyage to Jamaica, 1725

Sloane was elected to the Royal Society in 1685. In 1687, he became a fellow of the College of Physicians, and the same year went to Jamaica aboard HMS Assistance as personal physician to the new Governor of Jamaica, the 2nd Duke of Albemarle. Albemarle died in Jamaica the next year, 1688, so Sloane's visit lasted only fifteen months.

During his time in the Caribbean, Sloane visited several islands and collected more than 1,000 plant specimens as well as large supplies of cacao and Peruvian bark from which he later extracted quinine to treat eye ailments. Sloane noted about 800 new species of plants, which he catalogued in Latin in his Catalogus Plantarum Quae in Insula Jamaica Sponte Proveniunt (Catalogue of Jamaican Plants), published in 1696. His first writings about his trip appeared in the Philosophical Transactions of the Royal Society, in which Sloane described Jamaican plants such as the Pepper Tree and the coffee-shrub, alongside accounts of the earthquakes that struck Lima in 1687 and Jamaica in 1687/1688 and 1692. In Sloane's work, Natural History of Jamaica, he describes for the Queen of England the Black ethnomusic of Jamaica. With the help of a local musician, he included the musical score and words of festival songs.

- A Voyage to the Islands Madera, Barbados, Nieves, S. Christophers and Jamaica. Vol. 1. Sloane. 1707.
- A Voyage to the Islands Madera, Barbados, Nieves, St Christophers and Jamaica. Vol. 2. Sloane. 1725.

Sloane married Elizabeth Langley Rose, the widow of Fulke Rose of Jamaica, and daughter of Alderman John Langley, a wealthy heiress of sugar plantations in Jamaica worked by slaves. The couple had three daughters, Mary, Sarah and Elizabeth, (Note: 1695 – 20 May 1768) and one son, Hans; only Sarah and Elizabeth survived infancy. Sarah married George Stanley of Paultons and Elizabeth married Charles Cadogan, who became 2nd Baron Cadogan. Once back in Britain, income from Sloane's career as a physician and his London property investments, coupled with Elizabeth's inheritance, enabled Sloane to build his substantial collection of natural history artefacts in the following decades. Sloane additionally had investments in the Royal African and South Sea Companies, both of which traded in slaves.

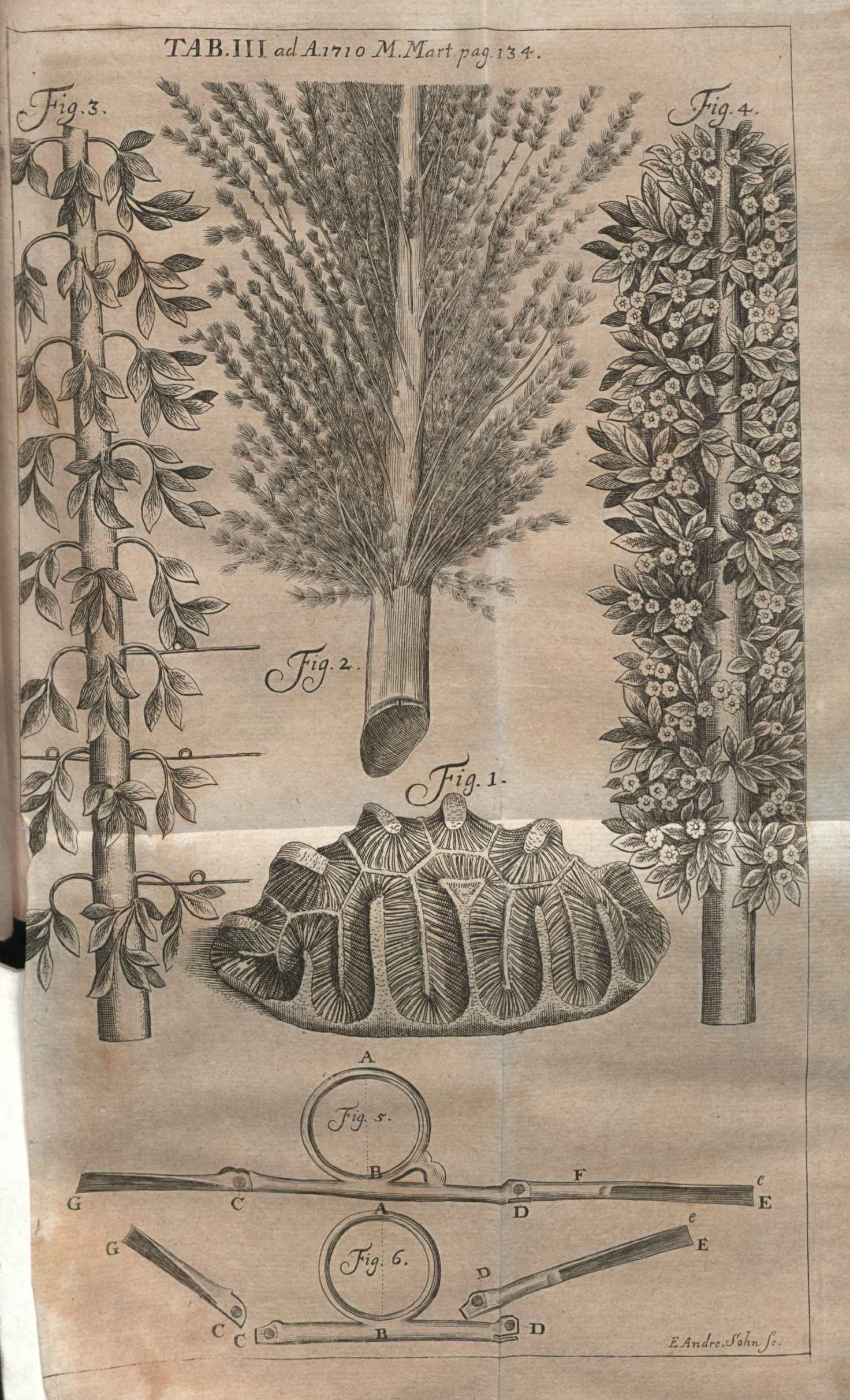
Illustration from critique of the first volume of A voyage to the islands Madera, Barbados, Nieves, S. Christophers and Jamaica, published in Acta Eruditorum, 1710

The Natural History Museum lists Sloane as the inventor of drinking chocolate with milk. However, according to historian James Delbourgo, the Jamaicans were brewing "a hot beverage brewed from shavings of freshly harvested cacao, boiled with milk and cinnamon" as far back as 1494. Sloane encountered the cocoa bean while he was in Jamaica, where the local people drank it mixed with water, though he is reported to have found it nauseating. Many recipes for mixing chocolate with spice, eggs, sugar and milk were in circulation by the seventeenth century. Sloane may have devised his own recipe for mixing chocolate with milk, though if so, he was probably not the first. (Some sources credit Daniel Peter as the inventor in 1875, using condensed milk; other sources point out that milk was added to chocolate centuries earlier in some countries.) By the 1750s, a Soho grocer named Nicholas Sanders claimed to be selling Sloane's recipe as a medicinal elixir, perhaps making "Sir Hans Sloane's Milk Chocolate" the first brand-name milk chocolate drink. By the nineteenth century, the Cadbury Brothers sold tins of drinking chocolate whose trade cards also invoked Sloane's recipe.

In 1707 Sloane listed the variety of punishments inflicted on slaves in Jamaica. For rebellion, slaves were usually punished "by nailing them down to the ground ... and then applying the fire by degrees from the feet and hands, burning them gradually up to the head, whereby their pains are extravagant." For lesser crimes, castration or mutilation ("chopping off half the foot") was the norm. And as for negligence, slaves "are usually whipt ... after they are whipt until they are raw, some put on their skins pepper and salt to make them smart; at other times their masters will drip melted wax on their skins, and use very exquisite torments."

== Society physician ==
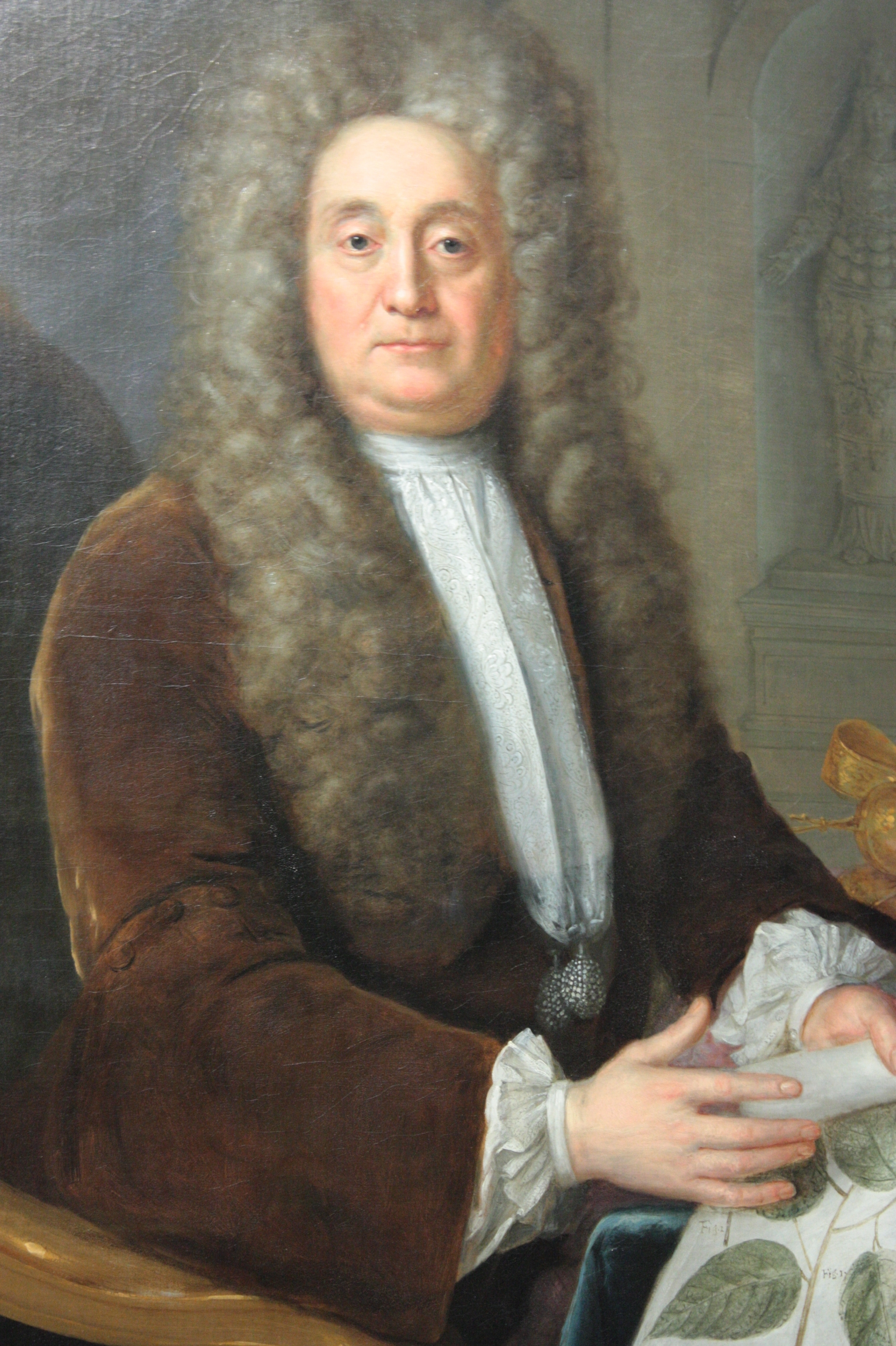
Sloane, 1736

Sloane started his own practice in 1689 at 3 Bloomsbury Place, London, Sloane worked among the upper classes where he was viewed as fashionable; he built a large practice which became lucrative. The physician served three successive sovereigns: Queen Anne, George I, and George II.

There was some criticism of Sloane during his lifetime as a mere "virtuoso", an undiscriminating collector who lacked understanding of scientific principles. One critic stated that he was merely interested in the collection of knick-knacks, and another called him the "foremost toyman of his time". Sir Isaac Newton described Sloane as "a villain and rascal" and "a very tricking fellow". Some believed that his true achievement was in making friends in high society and with important political figures, rather than in science. Even as a physician, he did not get a great deal of respect from many, being seen as primarily a seller of medications and a collector of curios. Sloane's only medical publication, an Account of a Medicine for Soreness, Weakness and other Distempers of the Eyes (London, 1745), was not published until its author was in his eighty-fifth year and had retired from practice.

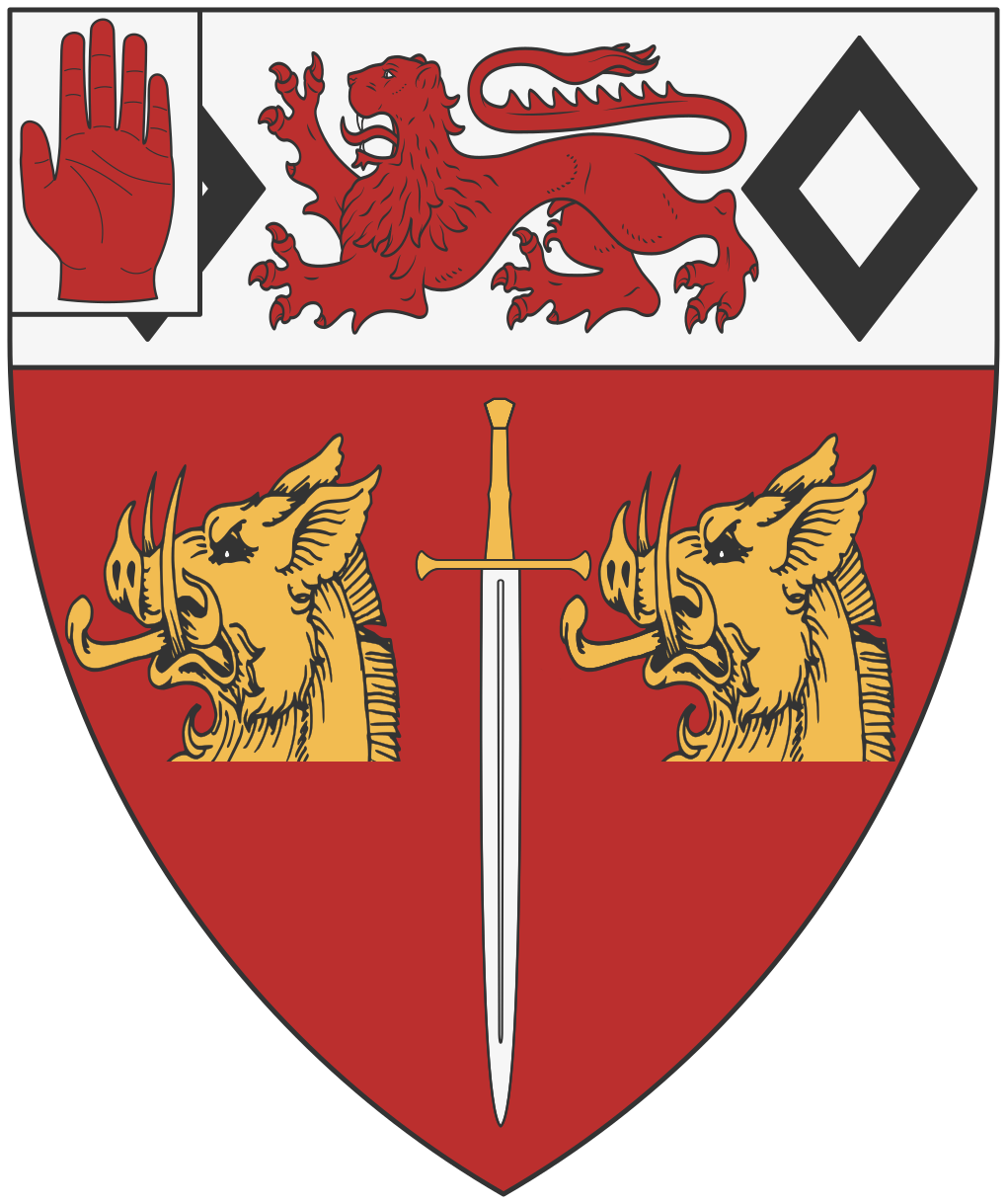
The coat of arms of Sir Hans Sloane

In 1716 Sloane was created a baronet, making him the first medical practitioner to receive a hereditary title. In 1719 he became president of the Royal College of Physicians, holding the office for sixteen years. In 1722 he was appointed physician-general to the army, and in 1727 first physician to George II.

He was elected president of Royal College of Physicians in 1719 and served in that role until 1735. He became secretary to the Royal Society in 1693, and edited its Philosophical Transactions for twenty years. In 1727 he succeeded Sir Isaac Newton as president. He retired from the Society at the age of eighty.

Sloane's role as First Secretary and later President of the Royal Society, a period which included his revitalising editorship of the Philosophical Transactions, permitted Sloane little time for progressing his own scientific research, which led to the criticism of Sloane as a mere "virtuoso".

Aside from his service as Royal Physician, Sloane's true achievement during his time at the Royal Society was in acting as a conduit between the worlds of science, politics and high society.

Sloane's time in France at the beginning of his career later enabled him to fulfil the role of intermediary between British and French scientists, fostering the sharing of knowledge between the two countries at the height of the Age of Enlightenment. Notables from that period who visited Sloane to view his collection include the Swiss anatomist Albrecht von Haller, Voltaire, Benjamin Franklin and Carl Linnaeus.

In 1745, at the age of eighty-five, and after having retired from medical practice, Sloane published his first medical work, Account of a Medicine for Soreness, Weakness and other Distempers of the Eyes (London, 1745).

During his life, Sloane was a correspondent of the French Académie Royale des Sciences and was named foreign associate in 1709, in addition to being a foreign member of the academies of science in Prussia, Saint Petersburg, Madrid and Göttingen.

=== Charity work ===
Sloane helped out at Christ's Hospital from 1694 to 1730 and donated his salary back to that institution. He also supported the Royal College of Physicians' dispensary of inexpensive medications and operated a free surgery every morning.

He was a founding governor of London's Foundling Hospital, the nation's first institution to care for abandoned children. Inoculation was required for all children in its care; Sloane was one of the physicians of that era who promoted inoculation as a method to prevent smallpox, using it on his own family and promoting it to the royal family. He had been introduced to the concept of inoculation by Lady Mary Wortley Montagu in the court of Queen Caroline.

== The British Museum and Chelsea Physic Garden ==
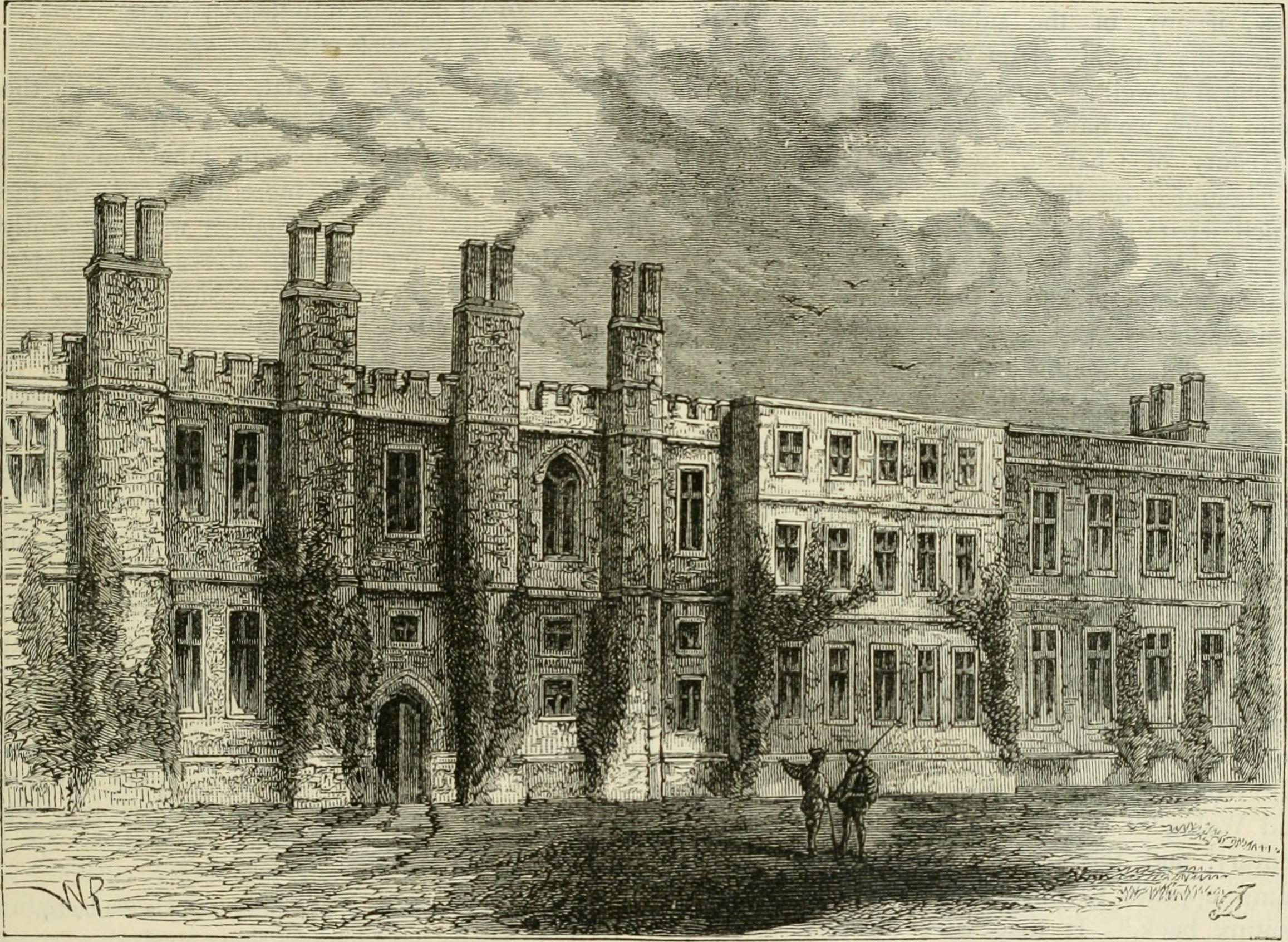
The Tudor House of his Chelsea Manor.

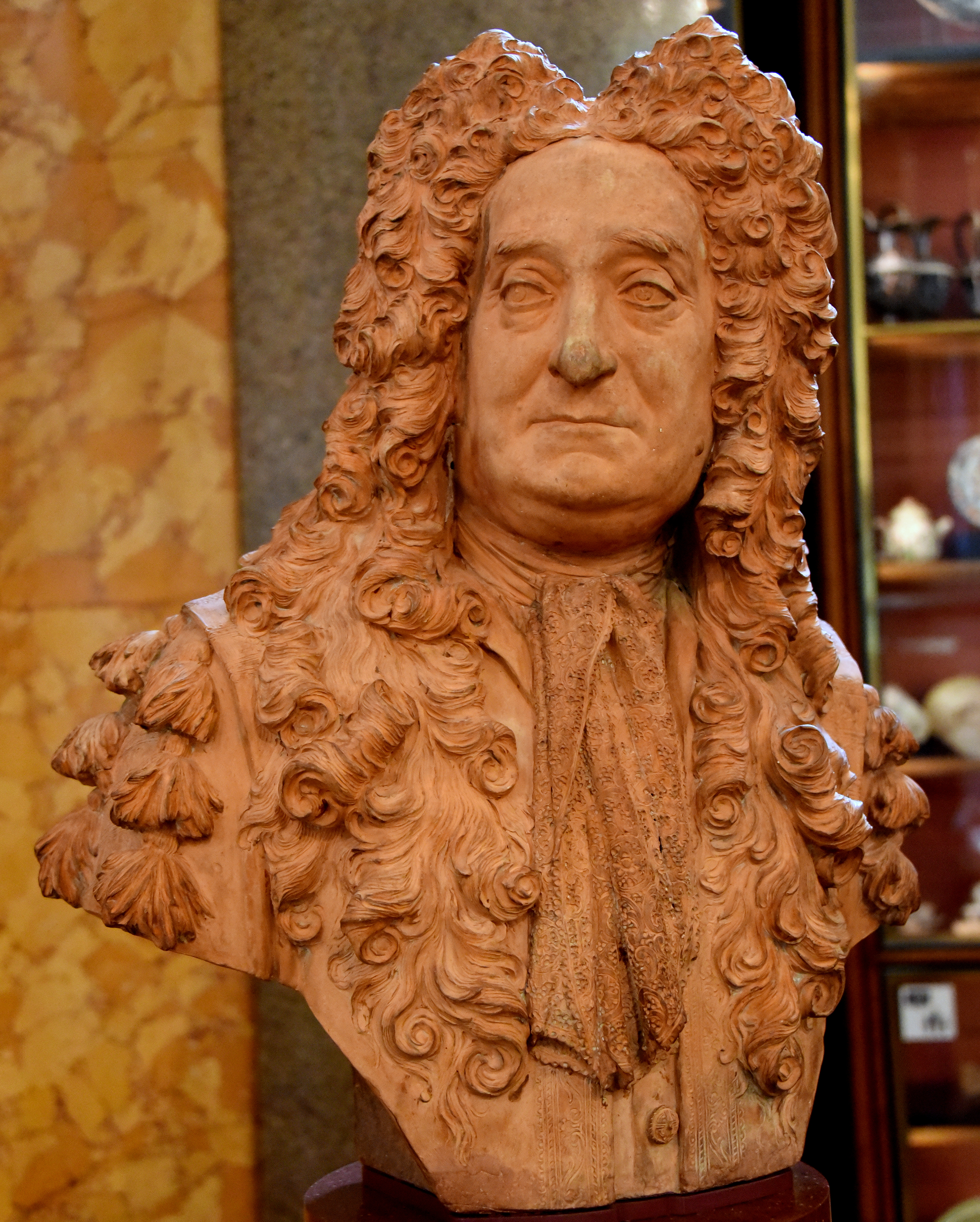
Bust of Sloane by Michael Rysbrack (1730s) in the British Museum

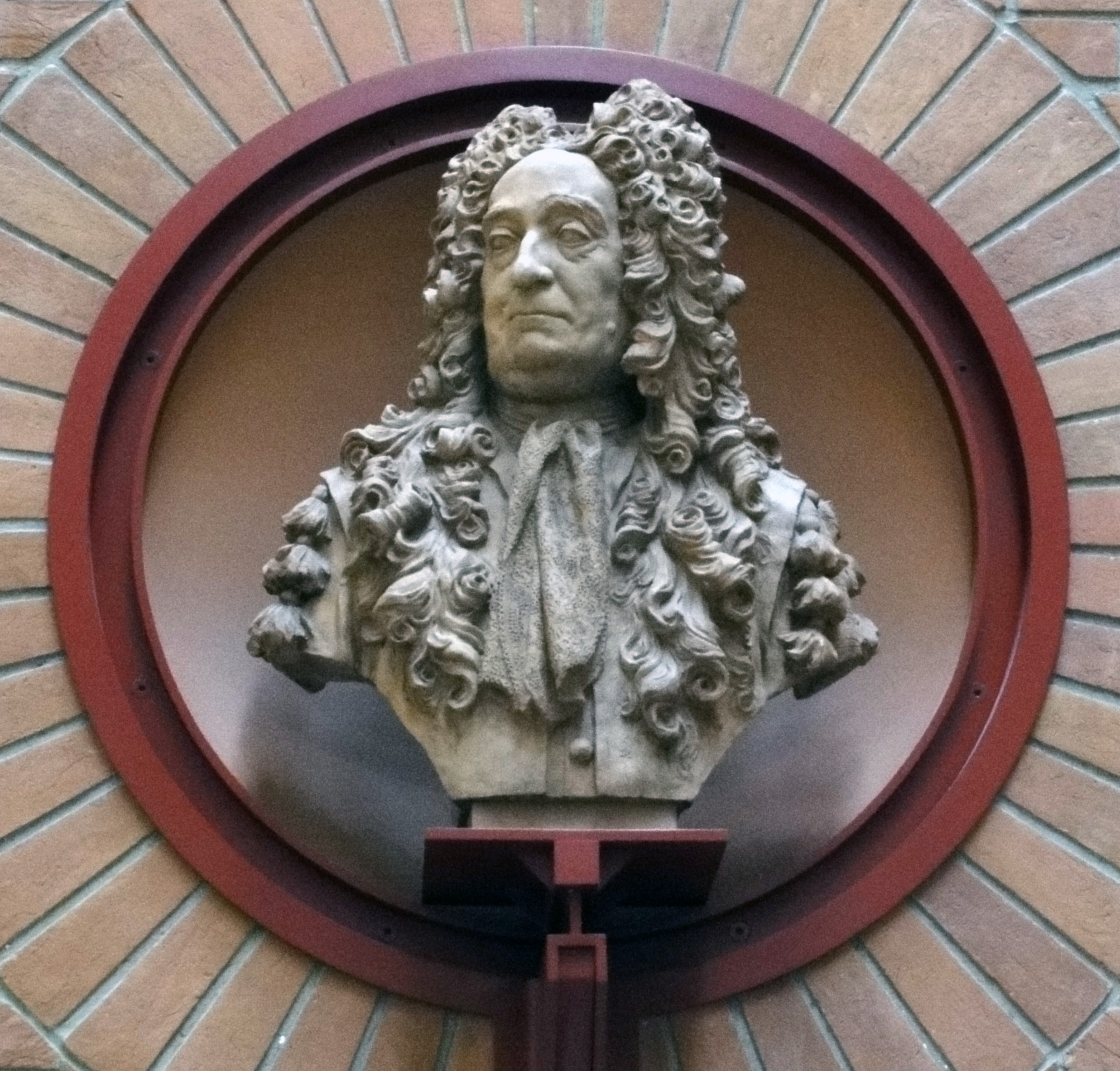
Bust by Michael Rysbrack, main foyer, British Library

Sloane's purchase of the manor of Chelsea, London, in 1712, provided the grounds for the Chelsea Physic Garden.

Over his lifetime, Sloane collected over 71,000 objects: books, manuscripts, drawings, coins and medals, plant specimens and others. His great stroke as a collector was to acquire in 1702 (by bequest, conditional on paying of certain debts) the cabinet of curiosities owned by William Courten, who had made collecting the business of his life.

When Sloane retired in 1741, his library and cabinet of curiosities, which he took with him from Bloomsbury to his house in Chelsea, had grown to be of unique value. He had acquired the extensive natural history collections of William Courten, Cardinal Filippo Antonio Gualterio, James Petiver, Nehemiah Grew, Leonard Plukenet, the Duchess of Beaufort, Adam Buddle, Paul Hermann, Franz Kiggelaer and Herman Boerhaave.

== Death and legacy ==
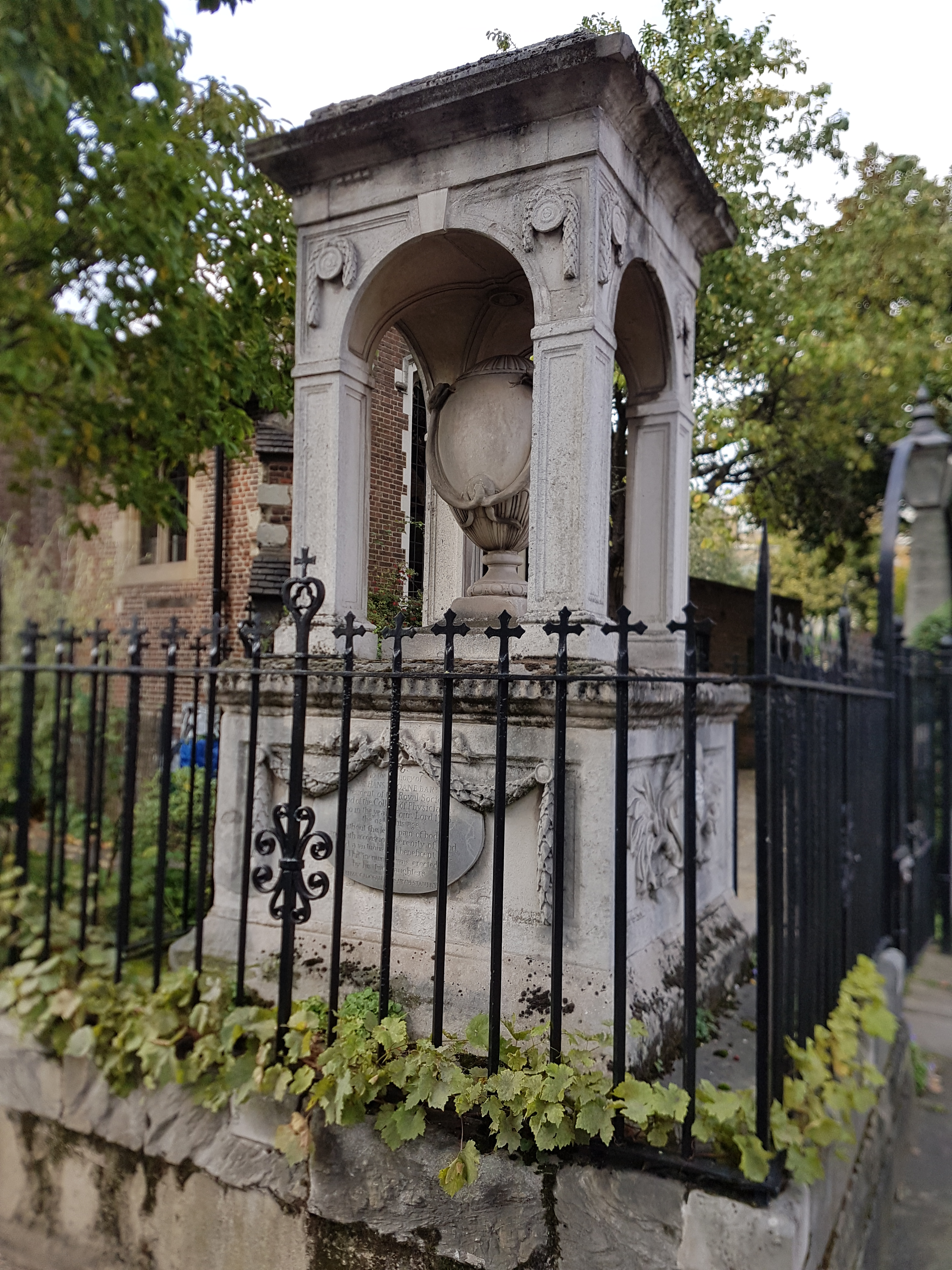
Sloane's monument at Chelsea Old Church

In his final year, Sir Hans Sloane suffered from a disorder with some paralysis. He died on the afternoon of 11 January 1753 at the Manor House, Chelsea, and was buried on 18 January in the south-east corner of the churchyard at Chelsea Old Church with a memorial inscribed as follows:

To the memory of SIR HANS SLOANE BAR^{T} President of the Royal Society, and of the College of Physicians; who in the year of our Lord 1753, the 92^{d} of his age, without the least pain of body and with a conscious serenity of mind, ended a virtuous and beneficent life. This monument was erected by his two daughters ELIZA CADOGAN and SARAH STANLEY

His grave is shared with his wife Elisabeth, who died on 17 September 1724.

On his death he bequeathed his books, manuscripts, prints, drawings, flora, fauna, medals, coins, seals, cameos and other curiosities to the nation, on condition that Parliament should pay his executors for a sum of £20,000 (equivalent to £3,834,052 in 2025) to be paid to his heirs—intentionally far less than the estimated value of the artefacts, contemporarily estimated at £50,000 (equivalent to £9,585,130 in 2025) or more according to some sources, and up to £80,000 (equivalent to £15,336,208 in 2025) or more by others. The bequest was accepted on those terms by an act passed the same year, and the collection, together with George II's royal library, and other objects. A significant proportion of this collection was later to become the foundation for the Natural History Museum. When Sloane wrote his will not only did he say he wanted to sell his work to the Parliament for 20,000 pounds, he also stated that he wanted his work to be seen by anyone who wanted to see it. The Curators thought that only scholars and the upper class were allowed to see the collection, believing that learning was a privilege that only the upper class had. This commonly-held contemporary view changed with time.

He also gave the Society of Apothecaries the land of the Chelsea Physic Garden which they had rented from the Chelsea estate since 1673.

A life-size statue of Sloane was erected in the town square of Killyleagh, the town in which he was born.

=== Controversy ===
In August 2020, a bust of Sloane in the British Museum's Enlightenment Gallery was moved by the museum. The decision came as part of that year's wave of removals of monuments to those who had benefited from slavery. History Ireland contributor Tony Canavan, writing of the decision and observing the fact that the Sloane family had moved to Ireland from Scotland during the Plantation of Ulster (or, more correctly, during the Plantation of Antrim and Down), noted that "the fact that Sloane came from a Scots-Irish family who benefited from a different kind of plantation, following the expulsion of natives and the confiscation of their land, [which seemed] never to have been an issue".

=== Places named after Sloane ===
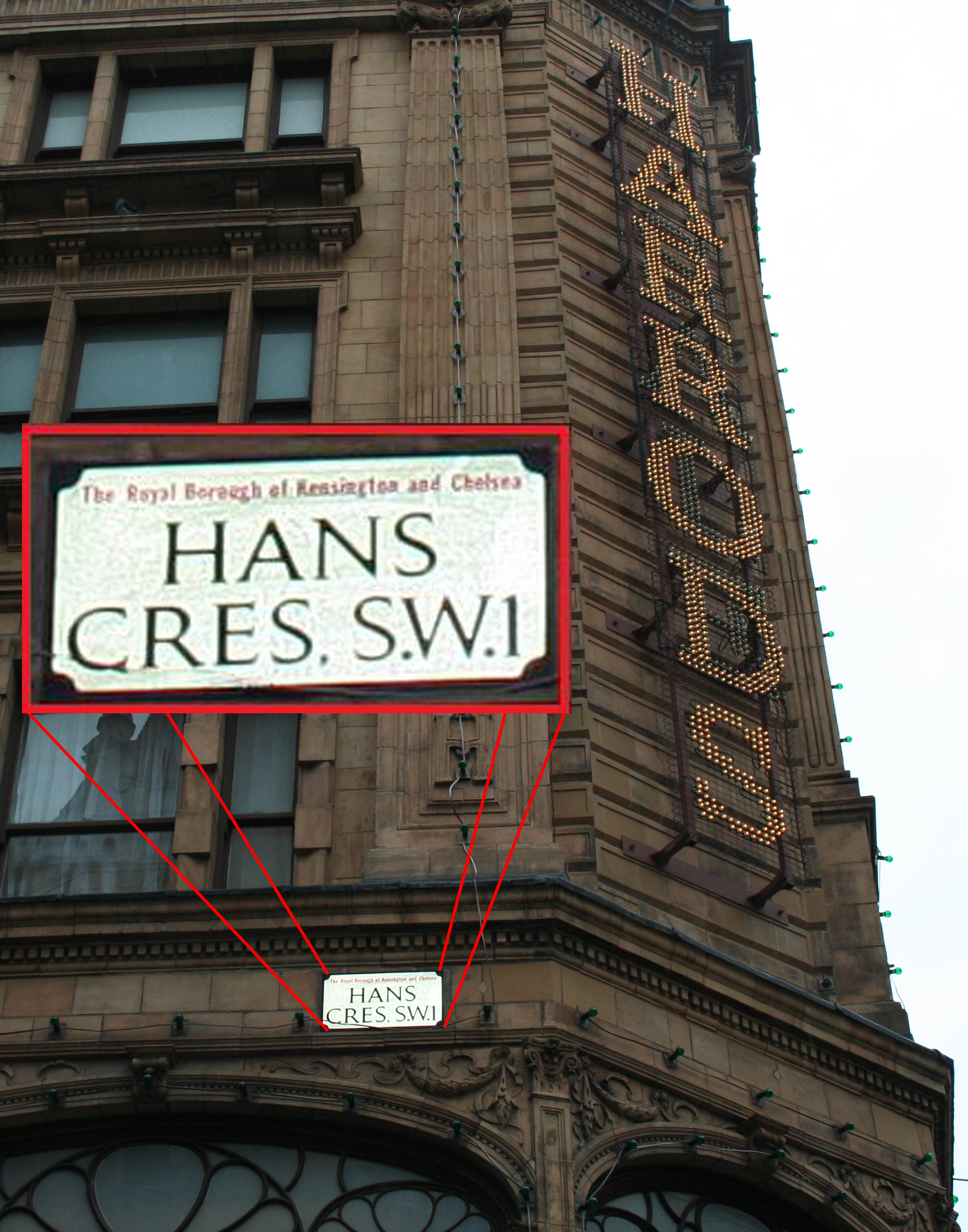
Hans Crescent street-sign on Harrods building, Knightsbridge

Sloane Square, Sloane Street, Sloane Avenue, Sloane Grammar School and Sloane Gardens in the Royal Borough of Kensington and Chelsea are named after Sloane. His first name is given to Hans Street, Hans Crescent, Hans Place and Hans Road, all of which are also situated in the Royal Borough.

=== Plants and animals named after Sloane ===
- Sloanea, a plant genus, was named after him by Linnaeus.
- Urania sloanus, a species of moth.
- Spondylurus sloanii, a species of lizard, was named in his honour by Daudin.
- Chauliodus sloani, a species of deep sea fish found across the world.

== See also ==
- British Library Leyden Medical Dissertations Collection
- George Edwards
- Levinus Vincent
- Thomas Thistlewood
- List of presidents of the Royal Society

== Bibliography ==
- Beolens, Bo; Watkins, Michael; Grayson, Michael (2011). The Eponym Dictionary of Reptiles. JHU Press. ISBN 978-1-4214-0135-5.
- Brooks, Eric St. John (1954). Sir Hans Sloane: the great collector and his circle. Batchworth Press.
- Preston, Henry C. (1854). The Life of North American Insects: Illustrated by Numerous Colored Engravings and Narratives. Sayles, Miller and Simons, printers. p. 13.
- This article incorporates text from a publication now in the public domain: Chisholm, Hugh, ed. (1911). "Sloane, Sir Hans". Encyclopædia Britannica. Vol. 25 (11th ed.). Cambridge University Press. p. 243.
- De Beer, Sir Gavin (1953). Sir Hans Sloane and the British Museum. London: Oxford University Press.
- Clarke, Jack A. (October 1980). "Sir Hans Sloane and Abbé Jean Paul Bignon: Notes on Collection Building in the Eighteenth Century". The Library Quarterly. 50 (4): 475–482. doi:10.1086/601019. JSTOR 4307275. S2CID 144688406.
- Lyons, J. 2008. p. 53 – 54. The Life and Times of a famous Ulsterman. Copeland Report for 2008. Copeland Bird Observatory
- Weld, Charles Richard (1848). A history of the Royal Society: with memoirs of the presidents. Vol. 1. London: Parker. p. 450.
- Munk, William (1861). The Roll of the Royal College of Physicians of London; Compiled from the Annals of the College and from Other Authentic Sources. Vol. 1 (2nd ed.). London: Longman, Green, Longman, and Roberts. p. 466.

Baronetage of Great Britain
New creation	Baronet (of Chelsea); 1716–1753	Extinct
Preceded by Byng baronets	Sloane baronets of Chelsea; 15 November 1715	Succeeded by Dixwell baronets
Professional and academic associations
Preceded by John Bateman	President of Royal College of Physicians; 1719–1735	Succeeded by Thomas Pellett
Preceded by Isaac Newton	13th President of the Royal Society; 1727–1741	Succeeded by Martin Folkes
