= James Delbourgo =

James Delbourgo is a writer and scholar, currently James Westfall Thompson Distinguished Professor of History at Rutgers University.

Delbourgo was born outside London to Italian parents and educated at Reigate Grammar School, where he studied literature, modern languages, theatre and acting. He then studied history at the University of East Anglia, Christ's College, Cambridge, and Columbia University. He has taught at McGill University and Harvard.

His book Collecting the World explored the life and career of Hans Sloane, which culminated in the foundation of the British Museum in 1753. It was based on 15 years of research in Sloane's surviving London collections in collaboration with the British Museum, Natural History Museum and British Library. Published by Penguin (Allen Lane), the book won four prizes, made four shortlists, and was named Book of the Week in the Guardian, London Times, Daily Mail and The Week Magazine, and one of Apollo Magazine's Books of the Year.

Delbourgo is also a novelist and audiobook narrator. He lives in New York.

== Selected publications ==
- A Noble Madness: The Dark Side of Collecting from Antiquity to Now (W.W. Norton, Quercus & Penguin Random House Audio, 2025).
- Collecting the World: Hans Sloane and the Origins of the British Museum (Allen Lane/Penguin, 2017): Leo Gershoy Award (AHA), Louis Gottschalk and Annibel Jenkins Prizes (ASECS), Hughes Prize (BSHS).
- A Most Amazing Scene of Wonders: Electricity and Enlightenment in Early America (Harvard, 2006): Thomas J Wilson Prize (HUP).
