= Cailler (disambiguation) =

Cailler is a Swiss chocolate brand.

Cailler may also refer to :

- François-Louis Cailler (1796–1852), Swiss chocolatier and industrialist who founded Cailler
- Mathieu Cailler (fl. from 2014), author
