= Chocolats+Croisier =

Swiss chocolate company

Chocolats+Croisier (born 1815) is a Swiss manufacturer of luxury chocolates. At one time, it was the oldest manufacturer of these products in Switzerland.

== History ==
Charles Henri Daniel Croisier founded the chocolate factory in 1815 in Geneva under the name "Croisier-Chaulmontet". Croisier's motto was to produce only the best chocolate.

The production of chocolate was arduous work in 1815: a chocolatier could only produce only 5–6 kg of chocolate per day. In 1844, Crozier's son took over management of Croisier-Chaulmontet. In 1850, the company began mechanizing its production. By 1884, Croisier-Chaulmontet had ordered two water wheels that were driven by the Rhône to power its production.

In 1927, the company opened a chocolate powders plant in Lausanne. That same year, the company was incorporated as Charles Croisier SA.

In 1950, Chocolats+Croisier closed due to poor economic conditions worldwide. Its now a small family owned business.

== See also ==
- Swiss chocolate

== Literature ==
- Schweizerisches Finanz-Jahrbuch, p. 75, 1907
- C. Heymann, Cartell-Rundschau, Volume 5, p. 183, 1907
- Directory of Swiss Manufacturers and Producers, Schweizerische Zentrale für Handelsförderung, Schweizerisches Nachweisbureau für Bezug und Absatz von Waren, Swiss Office for the Development of Trade., p. 29-30, 1945
- La semaine judiciaire paraissant à Genève: jurisprudence suisse et étrangère, Louis Vaucher, Gustave Fick, Jean Henry Patry, Société genevoise de droit et de législation, Société général d'imprimerie, p. 221, 1919
- Le Grand siècle de l'architecture genevoise, 1800-1914: un guide en douze promenades, Charles Weber, Gérard Deuber, Société d'art public (Geneva, Switzerland), Editor : Conrad André Beerli, Publisher : Société d'art public, p. 143, p. 230, 1985
- L'industrie chocolatière suisse avant, pendant et après la guerre, Volume 31 of Collection de l'École des hautes études commerciales de l'Université de Lausanne, Armand Mulhaupt, Impr. Vaudoise, p. 36, 1932
- L'Industrie Chocolatière Suisse, Etude Economique sur le Cacao et le Chocolat, Edition la Concorde, Edouard Schiess, 1913
- CANTON DE GENEVE - RECENSEMENT ARCHITECTURAL DU CANTON DE GENEVE; Direction du patrimoine et des sites - Service des monuments et des sites, Fiche RPI-108, Bénédict Frommel et Tanari Architectes
