= Rodolphe Lindt =

Swiss chocolatier and inventor (1855–1909)

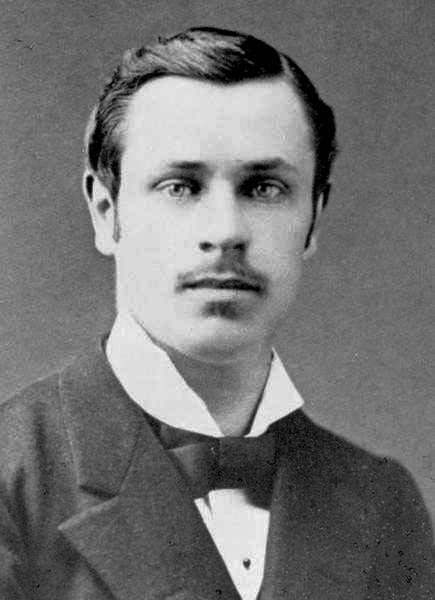
- Lindt c. 1881
- Born: 16 July 1855; Bern, Switzerland
- Died: 20 February 1909 (aged 53); Bern, Switzerland
- Occupation: Chocolatier
- Known for: Founder of Lindt; Inventor of conching

Rudolf Lindt (16 July 1855 – 20 February 1909), often known by his francized name Rodolphe Lindt, was a Swiss chocolate maker, chocolatier and inventor. He founded the Lindt brand of Swiss chocolate and invented the conching machine and other processes to improve the quality of chocolate.

== Life ==
Lindt was born on 16 July 1855 in Bern, to pharmacist and politician Johann Rudolf Lindt and his wife Amalia Eugenia Salchli. Between 1873 and 1875 he did an apprenticeship in Lausanne with the Amédée Kohler & Fils chocolate company, then managed by the sons of Charles-Amédée Kohler. In 1879, he founded his own chocolate factory in the Mattequartier, a section of the Old City of Bern.

In December 1879, he succeeded in improving the quality of chocolate by the development of the conching machine, a lengthwise stirring device which gives a finer consistency and lets undesired aromas evaporate. He was also among the first chocolate makers to add cocoa butter back into the chocolate mass (although not the very first one). These two innovations contributed greatly to the high quality of Swiss chocolate.

In 1899, Lindt sold his factory and the secret of conching to the Chocolat Sprüngli AG, who have traded as Chocoladefabriken Lindt & Sprüngli AG since. Sprüngli paid 1.5 million Gold francs for the marketing rights and the recipe.

== Sources ==
- Hans Rudolf Schmid (1985). "Lindt, Rudolf". Neue Deutsche Biographie (in German). Vol. 14. Berlin: Duncker & Humblot. pp. 616–617. (full text online).
- Alex Capus: Patriarchen: Zehn Portraits. Albrecht Knaus Verlag, München 2006, ISBN 3-813502-73-2
