= Peter's Chocolate =

Swiss chocolate brand

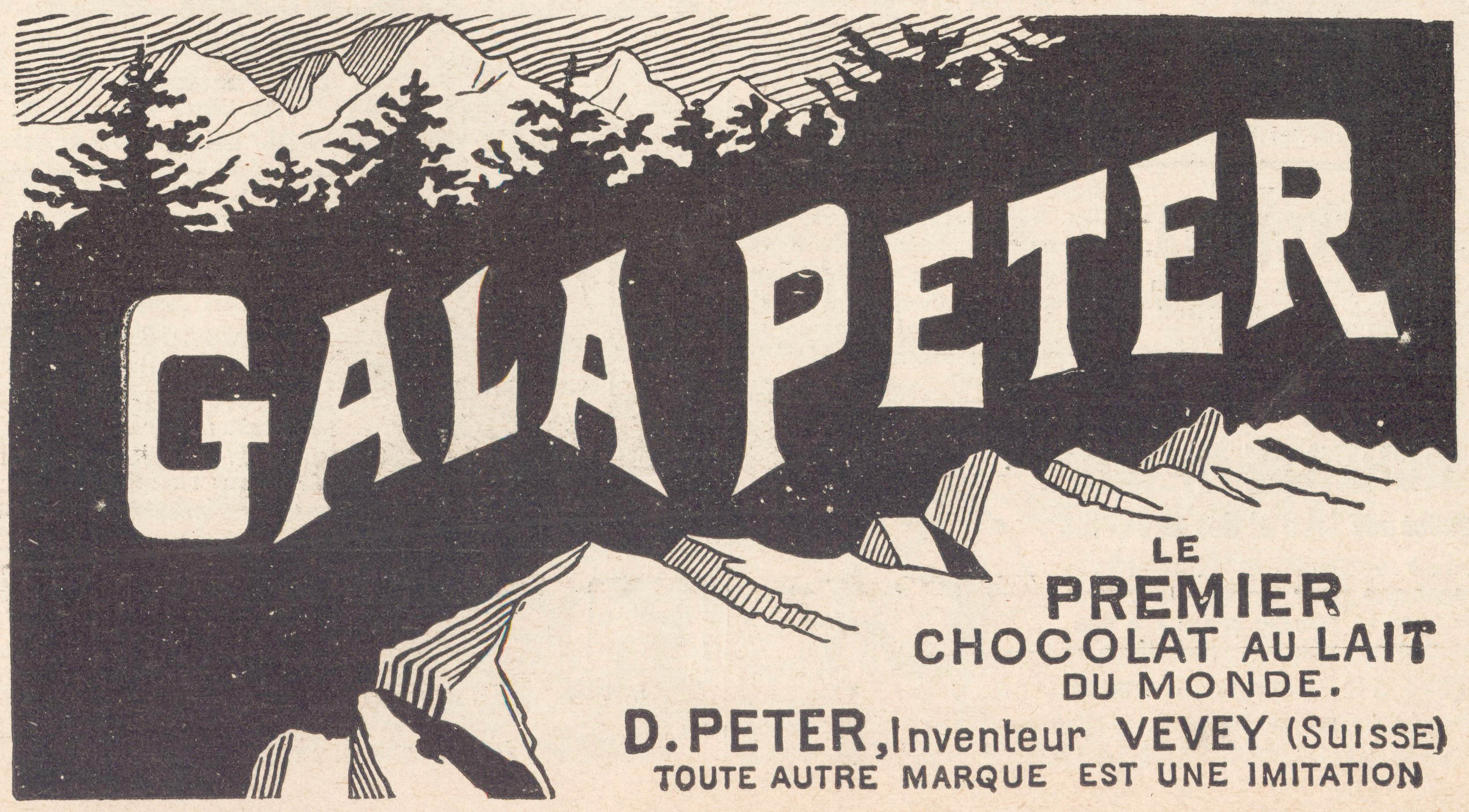
- Gala peter ad
- Founded: 1867
- Founder: Daniel Peter
- Fate: Mergers: Kohler (1904); Cailler (1911); Acquired by: Nestlé (1929); Cargill (brand) (2002)
- Successor: Brand owned by Cargill & Nestlé since 2002

Peter's Chocolate (French: Chocolat Peter, formerly Peter-Cailler) was a Swiss chocolate producer founded in 1867 by Daniel Peter in Vevey. It is notably the company who produced the first successful milk chocolate bar. It merged with Kohler in 1904, with Cailler in 1911, and was bought by Nestlé in 1929. The brand was purchased by Cargill in 2002. Peter's Chocolate was recurrently advertised with the image of a traditionally dressed man waving a chocolate bar, often with an Alpine scenery.

== History ==
The company was established by Daniel Peter in 1867, who was originally a grocer and candle maker based in Vevey. He was also the son-in-law of François-Louis Cailler, a pioneering (and neighbouring) chocolatier of the early 19th century. After gas lighting was installed in the town, Peter focused on the production of chocolate. His business started after the acquisition of one of Cailler's factories at Rue des Bosquets, which was therefore first named Peter-Cailler & Cie.

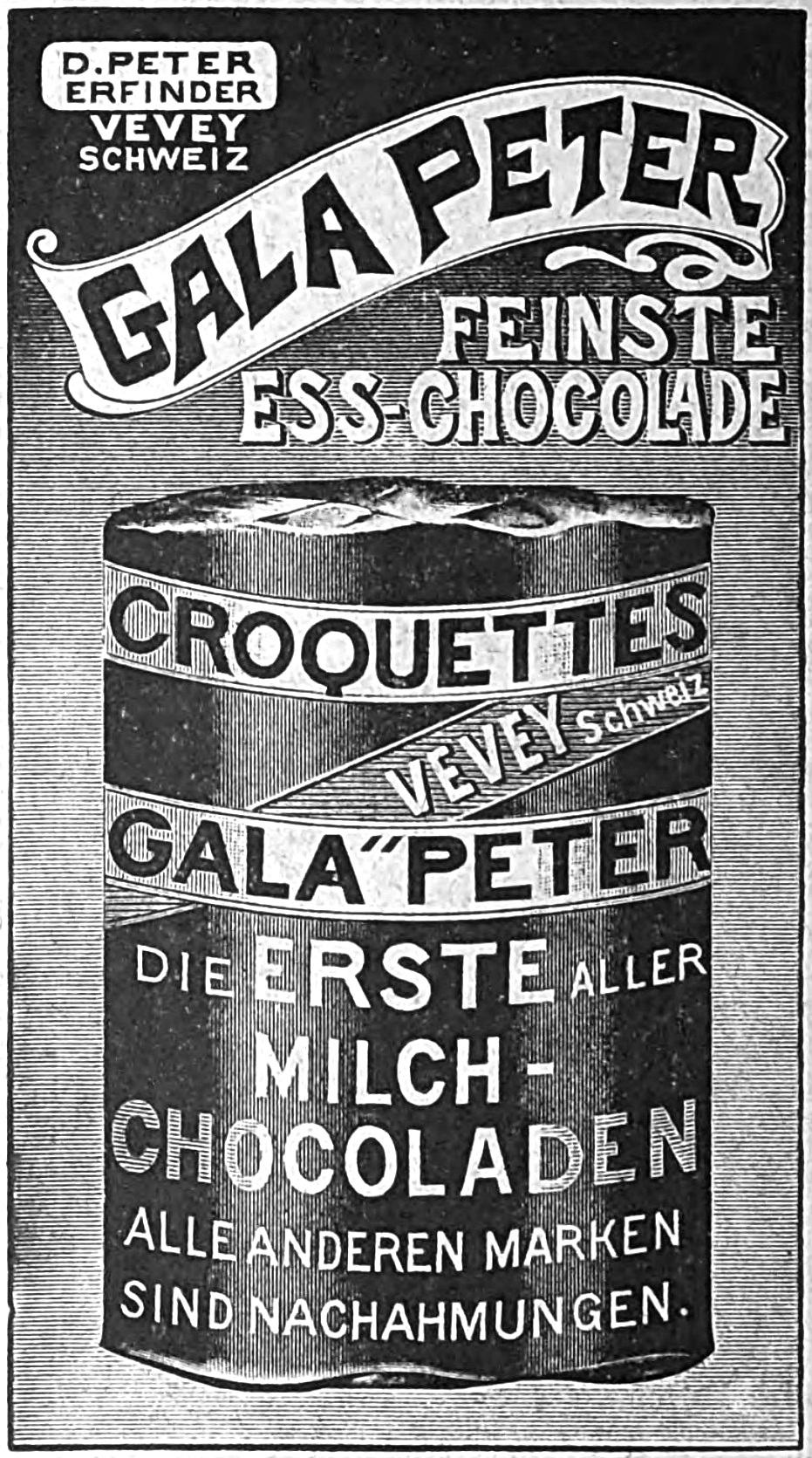
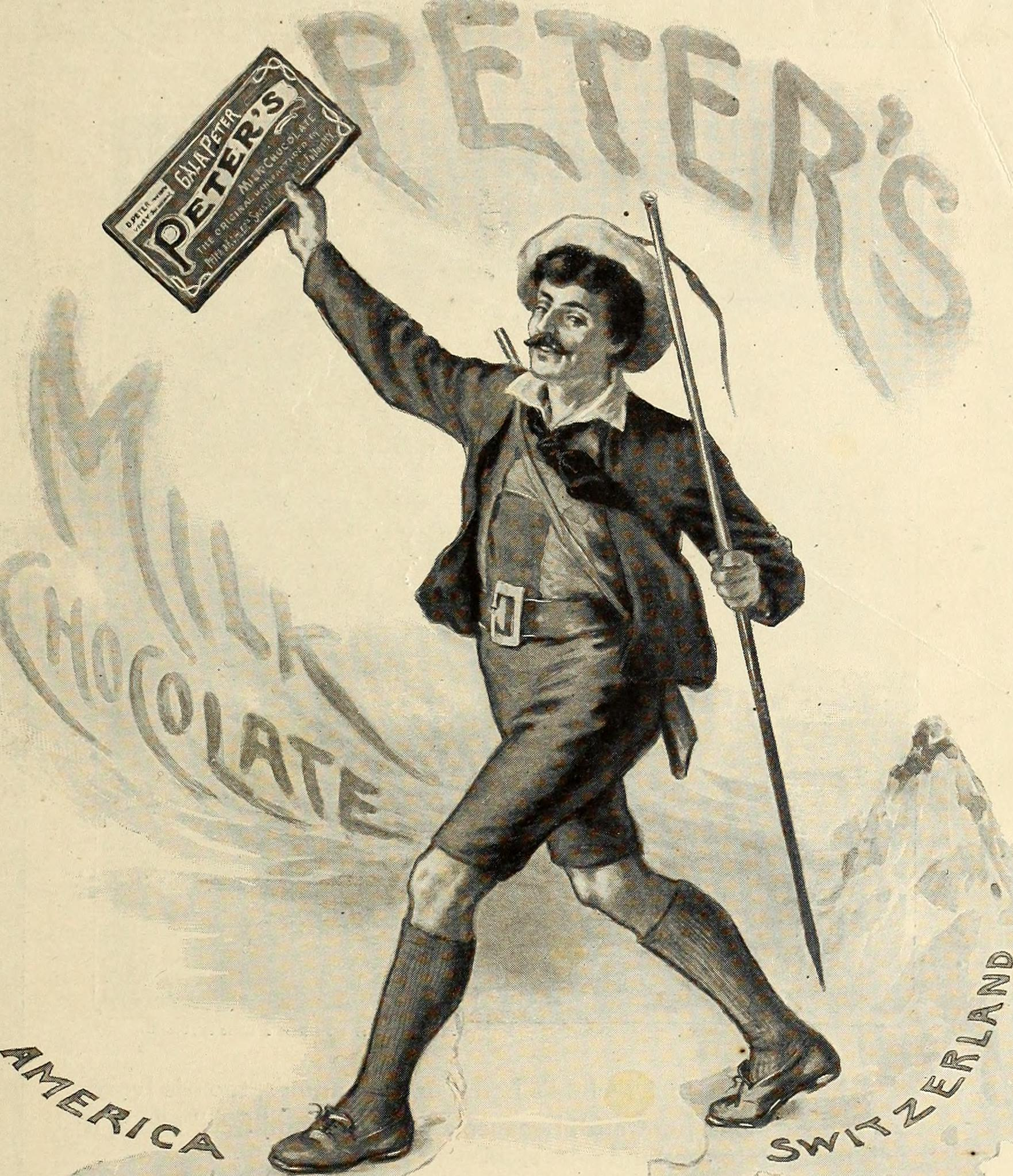
Ads for Gala Peter (1900s). Left: croquettes; right: tablet

One of the main goals of Peter as a chocolatier was the creation of a solid version of the popular chocolate milk beverage, so that it could be more easily transported and consumed. However, pure chocolate cannot contain any water, as it prevents it from having a smooth texture. Moisture also favors mildew, therefore a poor shelf life (earlier attempts had been made with small quantities of fresh milk). Peter ultimately solved the issue by using condensed milk from the Anglo-Swiss Milk Company, which he further dehydrated. This is called the milk chocolate crumb process. He previously also tried using powdered milk but without success. In 1875, a first version of solid milk chocolate was created and commercialized. However, it is only in 1887 that the final product was developed, with the help of conching invented by Lindt in 1879, which would refine the chocolate and make it smooth and homogeneous. The new milk chocolate bar was named Gala Peter, after the Greek word gala meaning 'milk', 'spiritual nourishment' or 'abundance'. The chocolate was first sold in croquettes, the common format for eating chocolate at the time, then in tablets.

Following the wide success of the Gala Peter brand, a larger factory was built at Orbe in 1901. The factory was later dismantled with the exception of a 52-metre-tall chimney (preserved and refurbished in 2021). The same year, Peter's Chocolate was exported to the United Kingdom. In 1904, the company merged with Kohler to form Peter Kohler and, in 1911, it merged with Cailler to form Peter Cailler Kohler. In 1907, the first production line was opened abroad with the collaboration of Nestlé, in Fulton in the United States. By 1911, Peter's milk chocolate recipe represented half of the world's chocolate consumption. Milk chocolate replaced dark chocolate as the "standard" chocolate.

The Orbe factory

Daniel Peter also launched the Delta Peter brand in the 1890s, which consisted of milk and cocoa powder that could be added to water to make a chocolate drink. Peter used a triangular packaging, with each individual triangle of pressed powder to be used for one cup.

During World War II, German secret agents attempted to assassinate British Prime Minister Winston Churchill (who was known to have a sweet tooth) with fake Peter's Chocolate bars. Underneath a real chocolate exterior were flat slabs of explosive which would have been activated by the breaking of a bar. The attempt on Churchill's life was prevented by the scientist Lord Victor Rothschild, who warned the public to watch out for the fake bars.

== See also ==
- Swiss chocolate
- List of bean-to-bar chocolate manufacturers
