= 100 Grand Bar =

Brand of chocolate bar

100 Grand

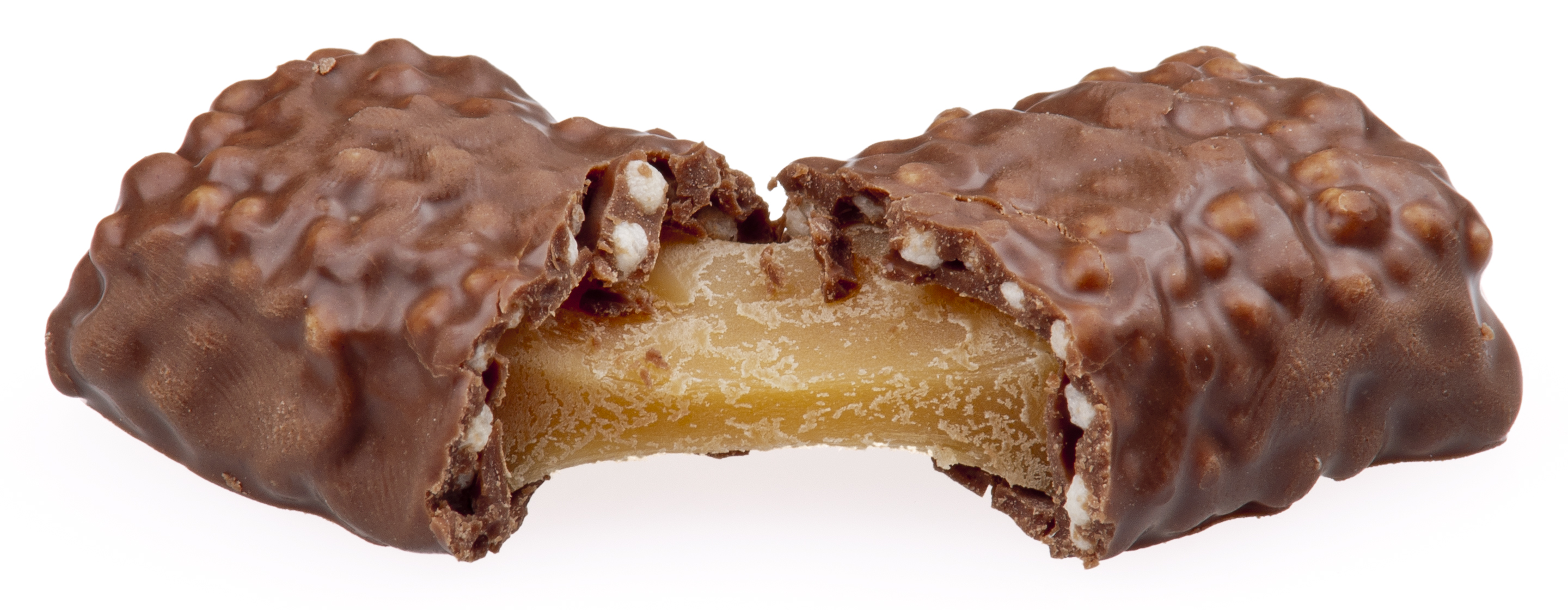
- A bar broken in half
- Product type: Candy Bar
- Current owner: Ferrero Group
- Produced by: Ferraro U.S.A., Inc.
- Country: United States
- Introduced: 1964; 62 years ago
- Markets: United States; Canada
- Previous owners: Nestlé
- Tagline: "Tastes so good it's almost illegal!"; "That's Rich!"

100 Grand (originally called the $100,000 Candy Bar and then, from the 1970s through the mid-1980s, the $100,000 Bar) is a candy bar produced by Ferrero.

The candy bar was created in 1964 by Nestlé. It weighs 1.5 ounces (43 g) and includes chocolate, caramel and crisped rice. The bar contains 201 calories; it is low in cholesterol and sodium, but high in saturated fat and sugar. Its first slogan was "Tastes so good it's almost illegal!" Its current slogan is "That's Rich!"

== Use in humor ==
In the mid-1990s, Opie and Anthony, DJs on Boston radio station WAAF-FM, promoted a giveaway of "100 Grand" over several weeks before finally revealing to the eventual winner that the prize was a 100 Grand bar rather than $100,000.

In May 2005, a Kentucky woman sued another radio station, WLTO-FM in Lexington, Kentucky, for a similar prank in which radio DJ DJ Slick gave away one of the bars, allegedly leading listeners to believe the DJ was giving away $100,000.

In the Seinfeld episode "The Dealership," George is complaining to a manager that a mechanic stole his Twix as evidenced by the cookie crumbs on his face. The manager asks if it could have been the $100,000 Bar to which George replies "no" because it's only rice and caramel. After this exchange, another dealership employee interjects to inform George that the name of the $100,000 Bar was changed to 100 Grand.

Comedians have used the bar's name in a similar fashion. In the episode "Business School" of The Office, Michael Scott tries to use the bar as a motivational tool. He says: "And if you sell enough of them, you will make a 'one hundred grand'!", and displays a 100 Grand bar. When he throws the bar into the bewildered audience, they separate, and let the bar hit one of the students in the head. On The Colbert Report, an image of a 100 Grand bar was part of the introduction to a recurring segment called Colbert Platinum, presented as tongue-in-cheek news and advice for the extremely rich. On the March 24, 2011 episode, Colbert interviewed the Senior Fellow for Global Health on the Council on Foreign Relations, Laurie Garrett, about escalating food prices and joked, "candy bars have gone up, I saw one that cost 100 Grand!"

== Sale to Ferrero ==
100 Grand was produced by Nestlé until 2018. In January of that year, Nestlé sold their American confectionery business to Ferrero SpA, allowing them to use the Nestlé name for one year. Initially, Ferrero merged the Nestlé confectionery business with Ferrara Candy Company, but they are now under the Ferrero brand.

== See also ==
- Chokito, a similar chocolate bar also introduced by Nestlé in 1964
- List of chocolate bar brands
