= Cailler =

Oldest Swiss chocolate brand

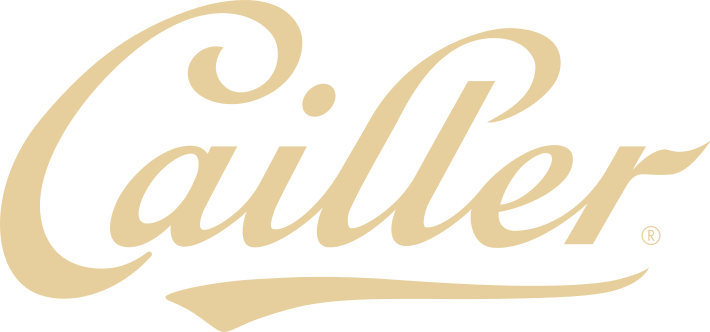

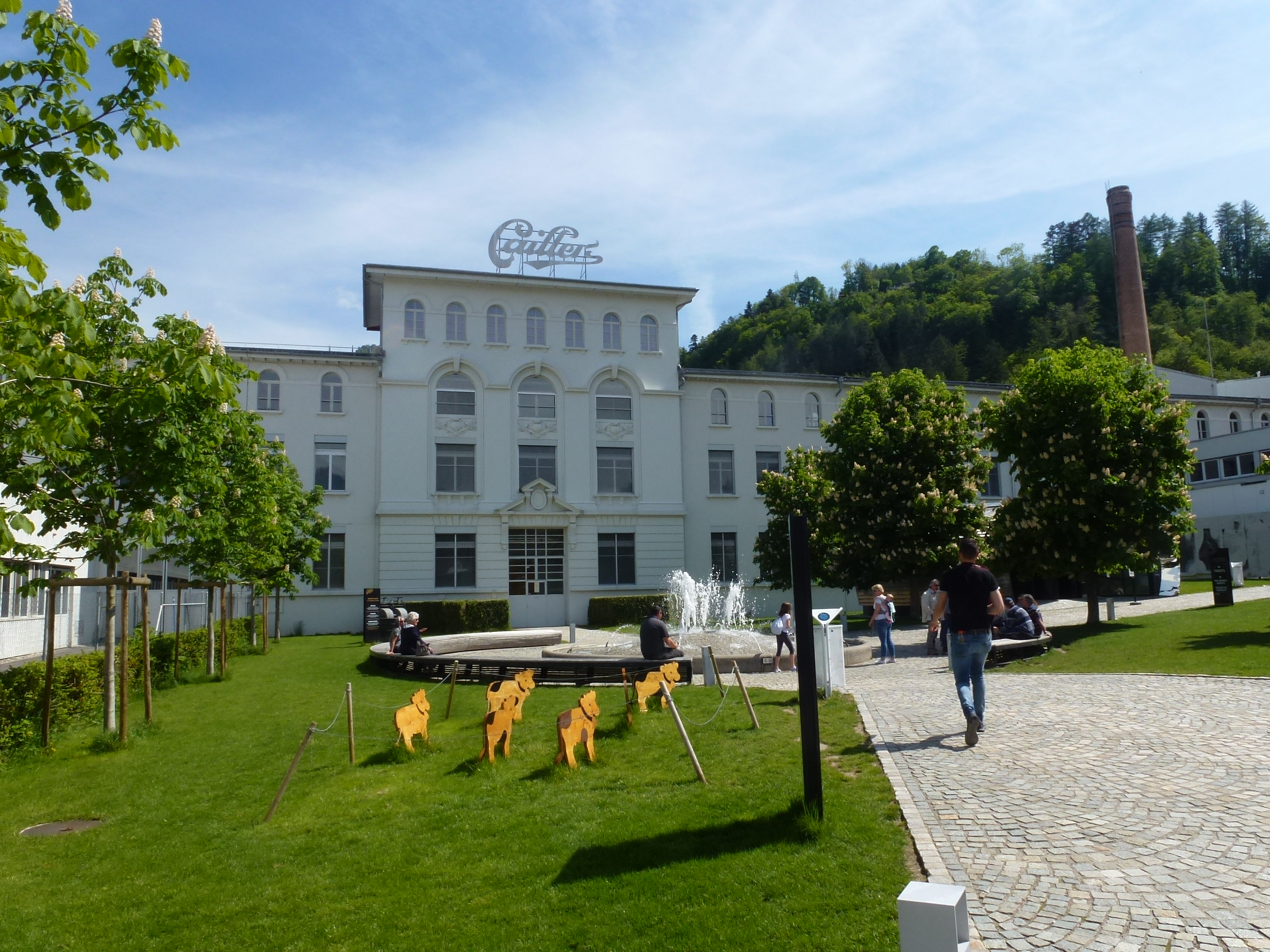
- The historical building of the Cailler chocolate factory in Broc. It also hosts the visitors' centre "Maison Cailler"
- Formerly: F.L. Cailler
- Type: Private (1819–1929)
- Industry: Food
- Founded: 1819; 207 years ago in Corsier-sur-Vevey
- Founder: François-Louis Cailler, Peter Cailler Kohler (PCK)
- Fate: Purchased by Nestlé in 1929, became a brand
- Headquarters: Broc, Switzerland
- Products: Confectionery, Swiss chocolate
- Brands: Chocolat Kohler, Peter's Chocolate
- Owner: Nestlé
- Website: cailler.ch

Cailler (French pronunciation: [kaje]) is a Swiss chocolate brand and production factory based in Broc. It was founded in Vevey by François-Louis Cailler in 1819 and remained independent until the early 20th century, when it associated with other producers. Shortly before, Cailler opened its main factory at Broc in 1898. The company was finally bought by Nestlé in 1929 and became a brand. Cailler is the oldest chocolate brand still in existence in Switzerland.

== History ==
=== Vevey factory ===
François-Louis Cailler was born in Vevey, Switzerland in 1796. Together with Abram L. C. Cusin, Cailler first opened a grocery shop in Vevey in 1818, where chocolate was also sold. At that time, chocolate was essentially considered as a tonic rather than a delicacy, and it was generally dissolved in water or milk. Cailler soon opened his first chocolate factory in neighbouring Corsier-sur-Vevey in 1819. It is considered one of the first modern chocolate factories. The factory allowed Cailler to produce solid and affordable chocolate, that was moulded into tablets or small blocks. Cailler was successful and, after a few years, he proposed 16 types of chocolate each with different packaging. Among popular products were pur caraque and commun sucré, which were also exported outside Switzerland. Vanilla and cinnamon flavoured chocolate bars were also made by Cailler. Chocolate production increased with the opening of two other factories in Corsier and Vevey in 1832 and 1840. The factories were located on the Canal de la Monneresse and were water powered. François-Louis Cailler died in 1852 and his wife Louise-Albertine continued to run the company along with their sons, Auguste and Alexandre.

In 1861, one of the Cailler factories at Rue des Bosquets was sold to François-Louis Cailler’s son-in-law: Daniel Peter. There, Peter would establish his own independent chocolate company and, after a few decades, invent milk chocolate.

In the early 1890s, following the development of the conching process, Cailler began manufacturing a new type of chocolate specially made for eating.

=== Broc factory ===
In 1898, Alexandre-Louis Cailler (grandson of François-Louis Cailler) opened the current factory of Broc. The following year, the dedicated hydroelectrical plant on the Jogne was commissioned, allowing the electrification of the entire village of Broc. The waters of the Jogne had been diverted by means of a one-kilometre-long tunnel, allowing an electrical production of 2,000 HP through a 44-metre fall. 1912 saw the inauguration of the Bulle-Broc-Fabrique railway, which replaced horse-drawn goods convoys to Bulle, the major town in the area. Chocolate, notably including milk chocolate using milk from local dairies, began to be produced on a massive scale. A foreman who previously worked for Daniel Peter helped Cailler develop this new type of chocolate, which would become particularly successful. The number of workers grew from 76 in 1898 to 630 in 1901. The number of workers peaked in 1930, at 1,796.

Meanwhile, in 1904, Daniel Peter and Charles-Amédée Kohler (son of Charles-Amédée Kohler who founded Chocolat Kohler in 1830) became partners and founded the Société générale suisse des chocolats Peter et Kohler réunis. in 1911, the company created by Peter and Kohler merged with Cailler. In 1929, Peter, Cailler, Kohler, Chocolats Suisses S.A. finally merged with the Nestlé group. Until 1951, Nestlé used all three names Peter Cailler Kohler for its chocolates, which were then commonly referred to as the PCK brand. Nestlé ultimately retained the Cailler brand and signature for the chocolate made in Broc.

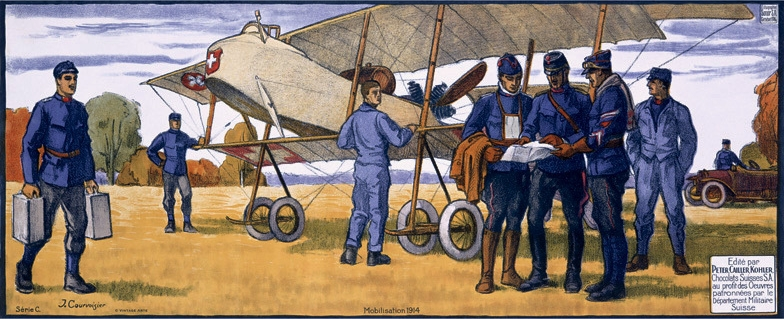
World War I mobilization poster for the Swiss Army by PCK

In 2006, Cailler packaging was revamped under the leadership of Nelly Wenger (head of Expo.02). New transparent plastic boxes were designed by architect Jean Nouvel (also involved in Expo.02). The change was met with criticism and, following price increases, Cailler products were boycotted by some retailers. In 2007, the plastic packaging was discontinued.

== Location ==
The Broc factory complex in the early 20th century, with the former hydroelectric power plant on the Jogne (centre), and the modern plant (upper left)

Cailler is located in the canton of Fribourg, in the Alpine foothills of the Gruyères region, which is the cradle of Gruyère and reputed for its fine milk production. Its chocolates are produced at Maison Cailler. The factory complex is located north of Broc, on the Jogne river, near its mouth in the Lake of Gruyère. The complex has a dedicated railway station, Broc-Fabrique, which is connected to Bulle via the Bulle–Broc railway line, an originally narrow-gauge line later converted to a standard gauge in 2023.

=== Tourism ===
Maison Cailler educates visitors on the history of the brand, ingredient sourcing, and the artistry of chocolate-making — visitors are allowed to try chocolates in the tasting room at the end of tours. The factory is open seven days a week and accommodates visits in 12 languages. Activities beyond the museum include: chocolate workshops, an escape game and an outdoor playground.

The "Chocolate Train", operated by the Montreux–Lenk im Simmental line, connects Montreux to the factory.

An additional theme park dedicated to chocolate was planned for 2025.

== Products ==
Cailler produces a wide range of 100g and 200g chocolate tablets, essentially milk but also dark and white. It also produces individual chocolate bars, notably the Branche. Cailler also produces praline boxes, the oldest being Ambassador (since 1890) and Fémina (1902). Several Cailler products, especially the Branche, are imitated by other producers, for instance by the other Swiss brand Frey.

Below are listed the most notable Cailler-branded products:

- Ambassador (since 1890): A box of assorted pralines
- Crémant (1890s): A dark chocolate tablet
- Lait (1898): A plain milk tablet made with double condensed milk. It is wrapped in mauve paper.
- Fémina (1902): Another box of assorted pralines (gianduja-like)
- Branche (1904): A cylindrical and rugged branch-looking combination bar. The original Branche consists of a praline centre, with a coating of milk chocolate and hazelnut splinters; sold in either red, blue or green aluminium wrapper. The Branche was created by Kohler; it is mentioned in his recipe books from 1896. It has been, however, produced by Cailler since 1904. It is partly made with recycled broken confectionery, originally re-melted and rolled by hand into sticks. Often placed inside a bread roll or bun, it today remains a particularly iconic chocolate bar, and the name branche has become a generic term in French for any similarly-shaped chocolate bar. Various other flavours have been produced by Cailler, such as a dark chocolate version.
- Chocmel (1920): A honey and almond milk chocolate tablet. Probably inspired by Toblerone.
- Frigor (1923): A milk chocolate tablet with a soft hazelnut and almond cream filling. Probably inspired by Jules Séchaud's Crémor.
- Rayon (1937): A honey nougat milk chocolate tablet with air bubbles

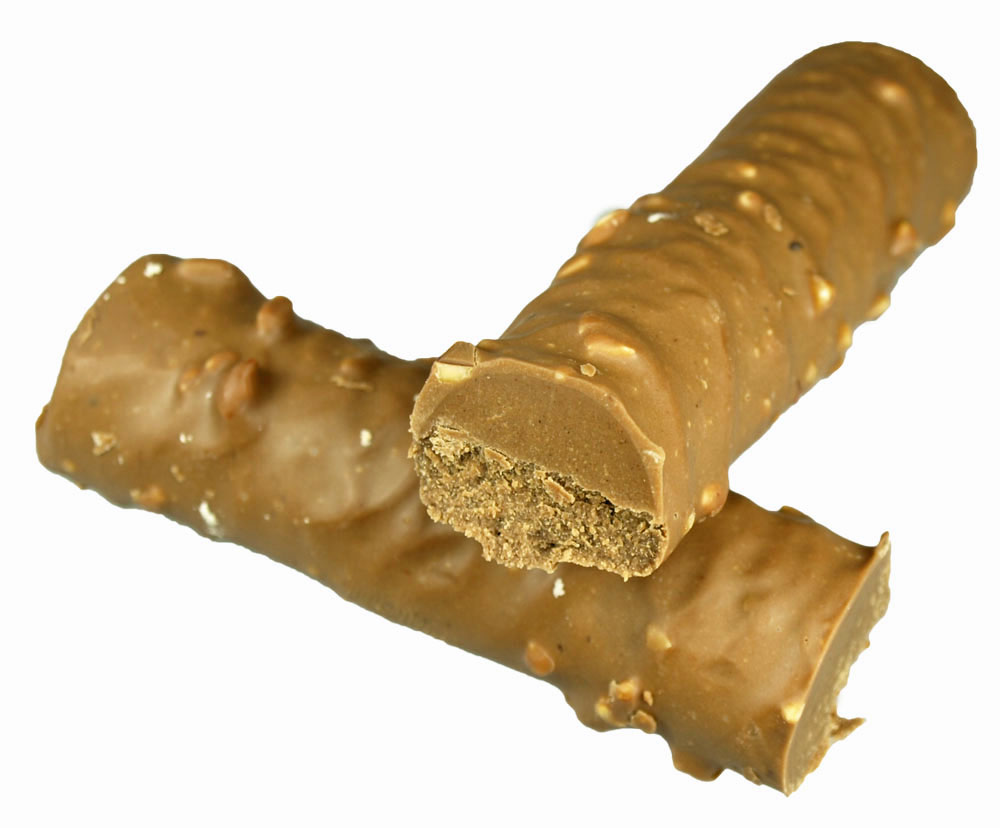
Branche Originale

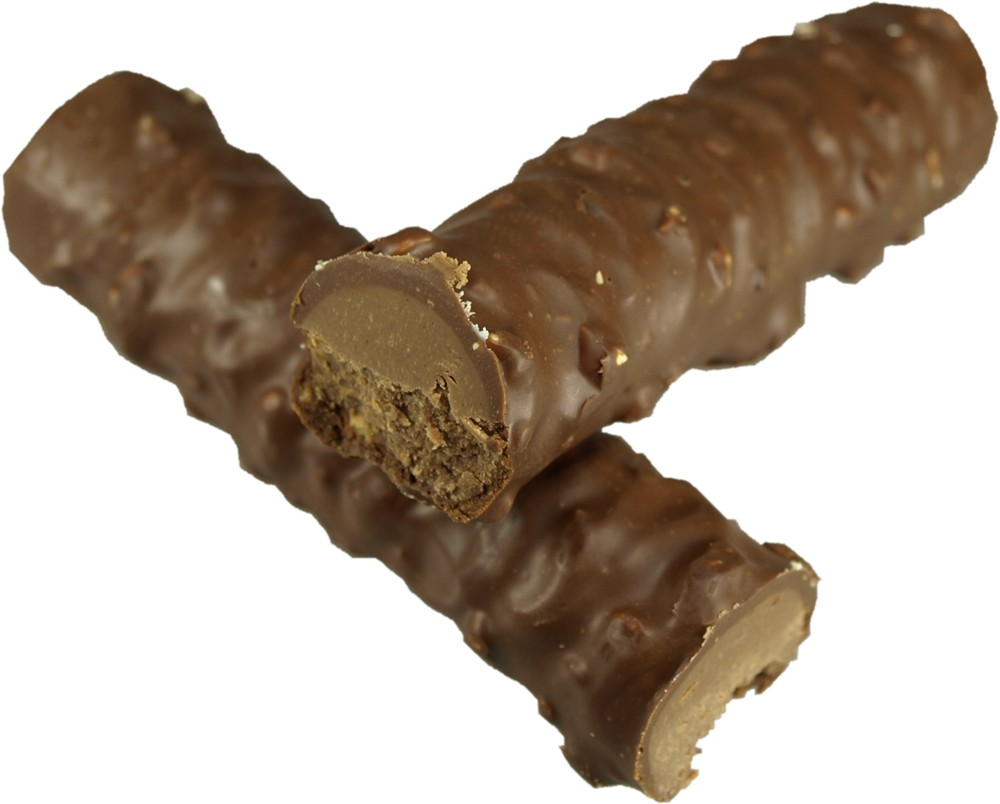
Branche Crémant (dark version)

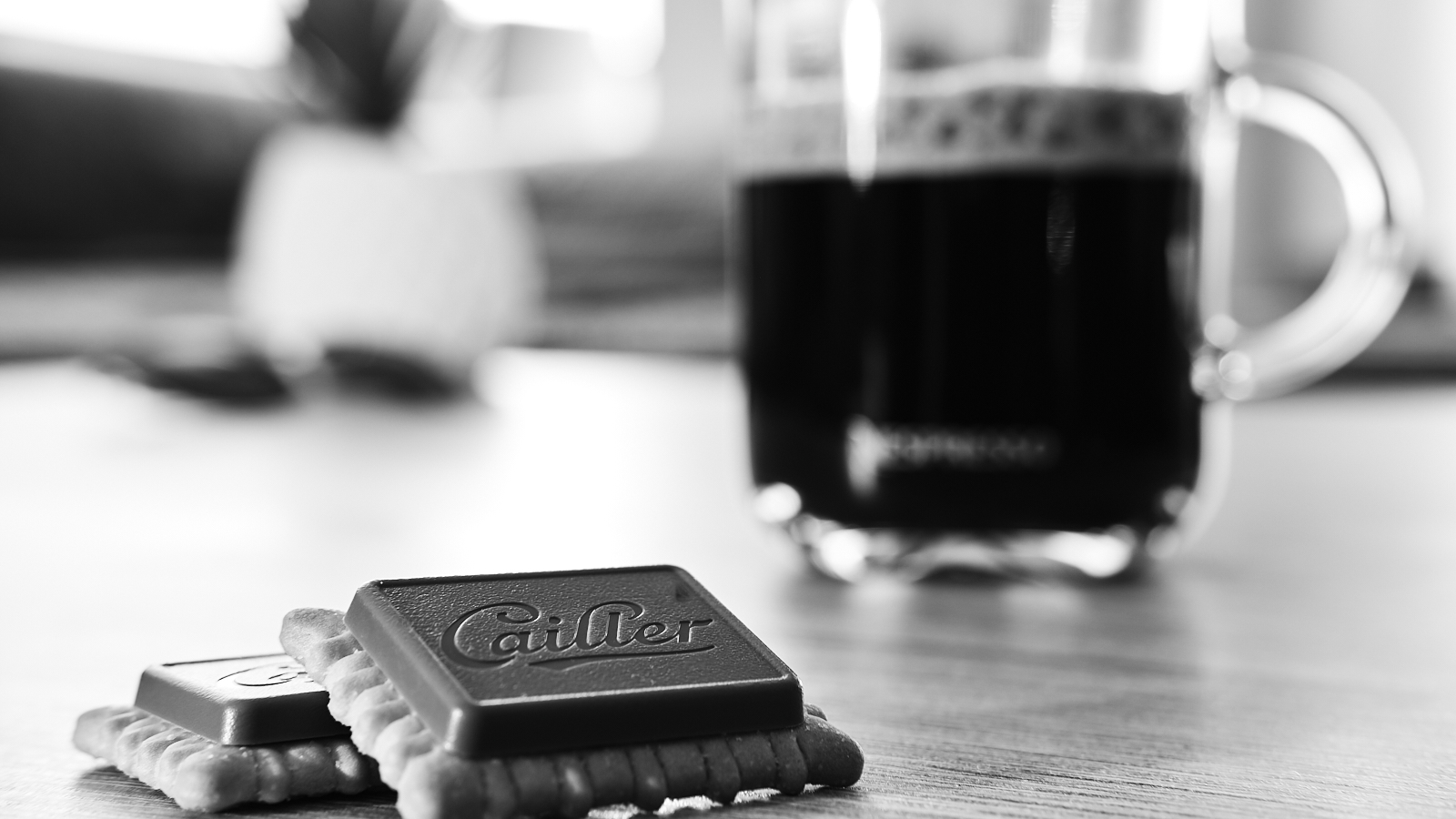
Kambly Cailler chocolate biscuits

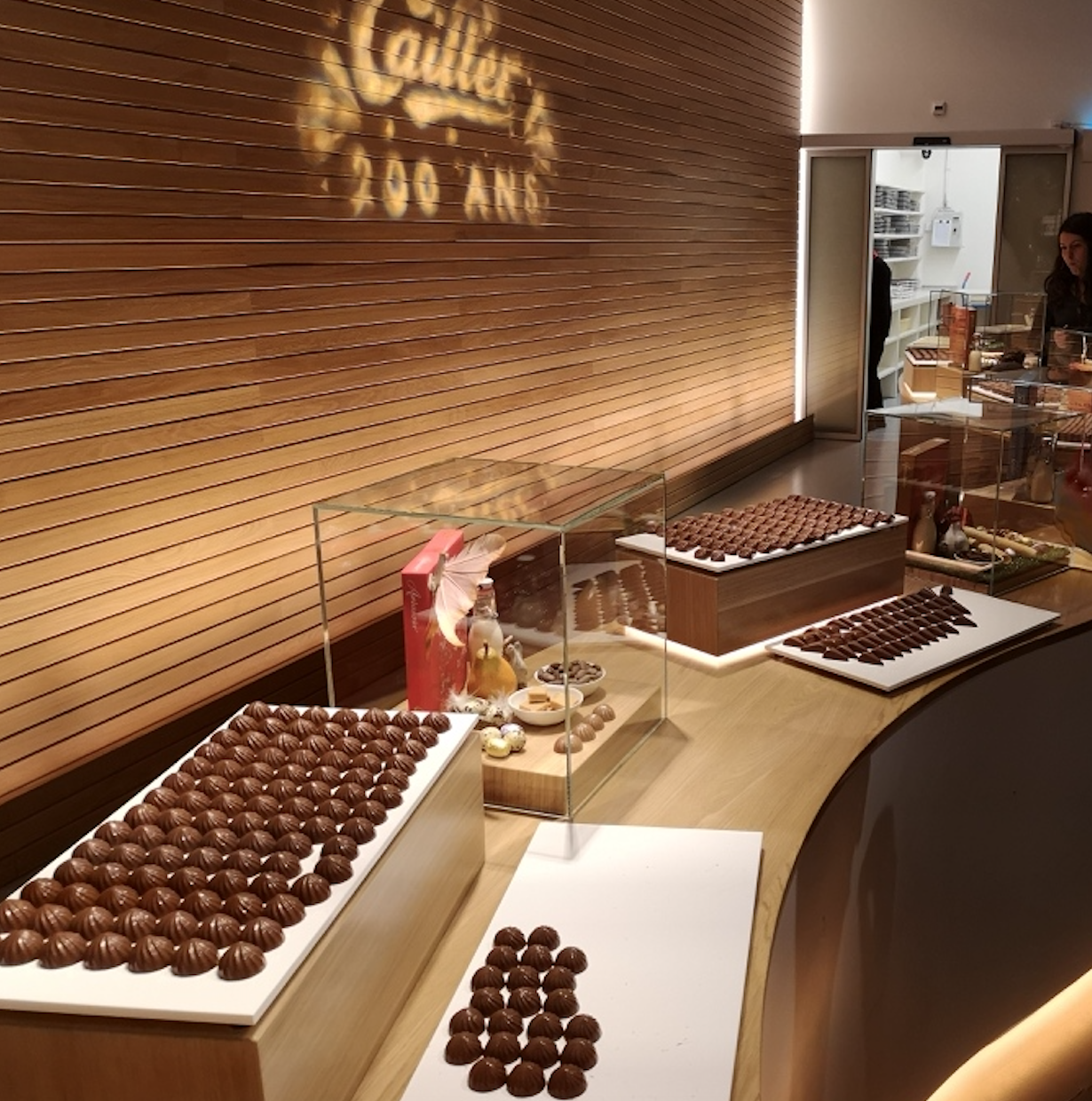
Display of Ambassador pralines

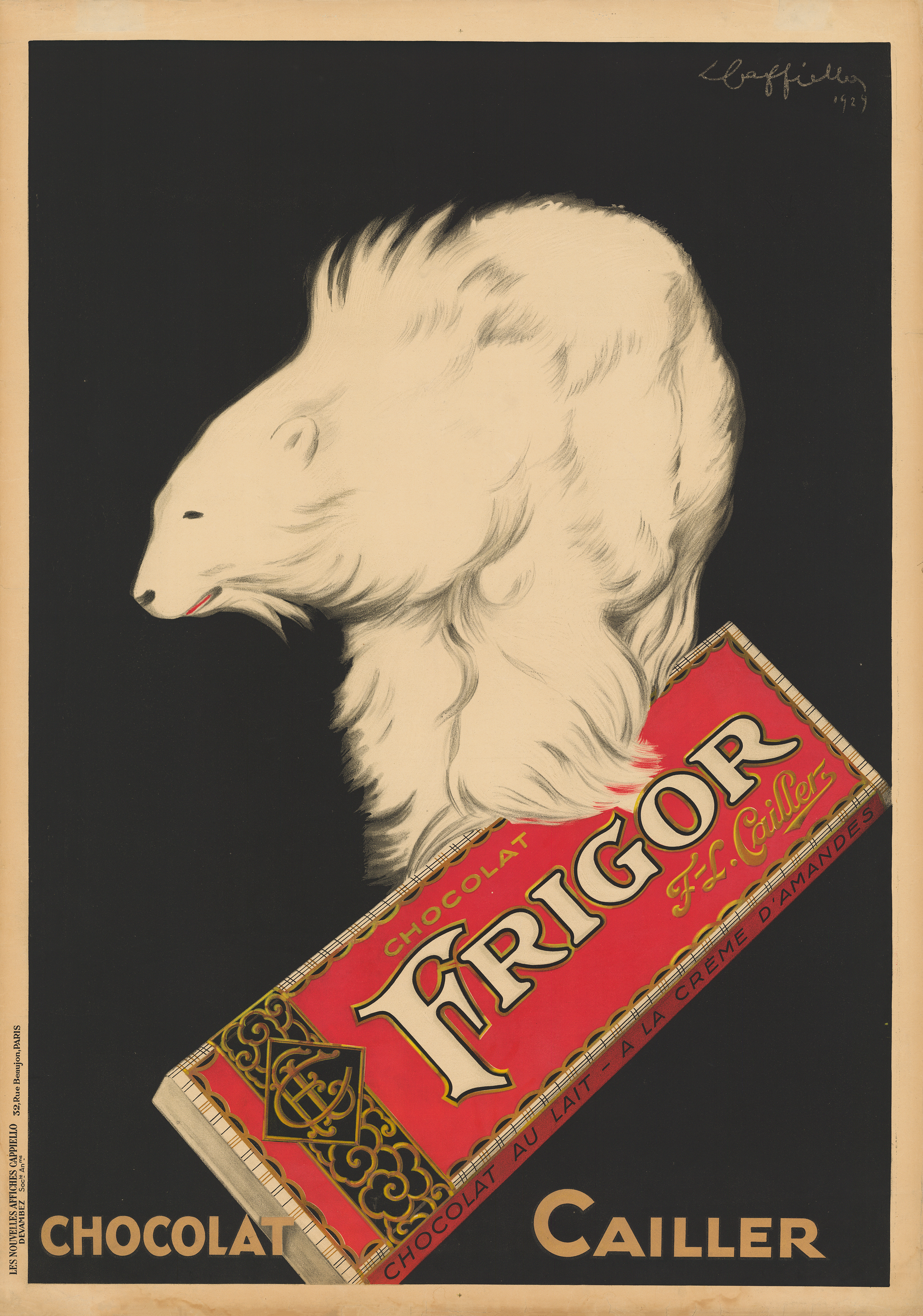
Frigor bar in a 1929 ad

=== Other ===
Other chocolate bar brands have been produced by Nestlé at the Cailler factory, such as the Chokito (since 1964). In 2018, production of Chokito (and Rayon) was relocated elsewhere in Switzerland.
