= Swiss chocolate =

Chocolate processed in Switzerland

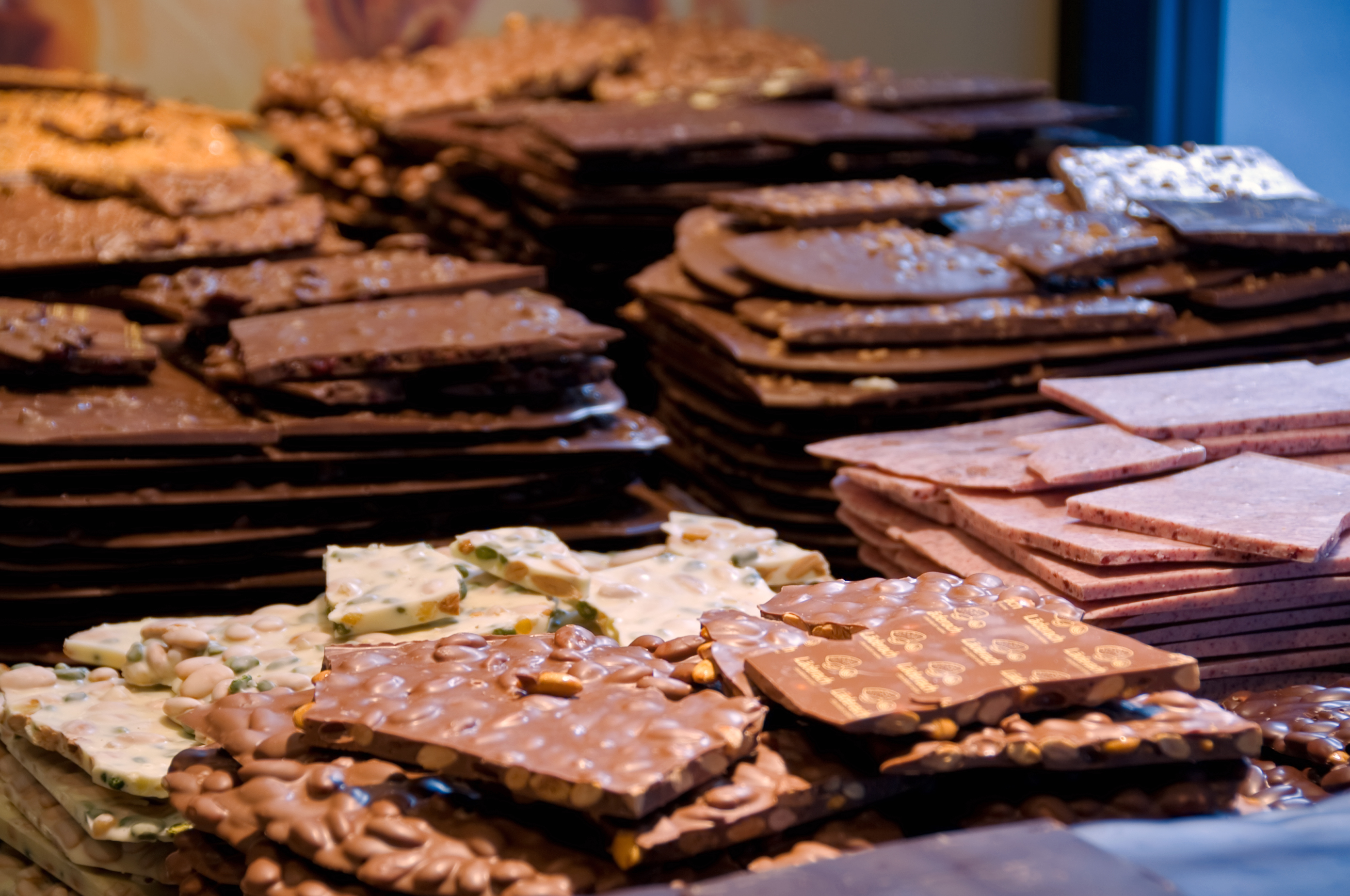
A variety of chocolate bark sold in a Zurich store

Swiss chocolate (German: Schweizer Schokolade; French: chocolat suisse; Italian: cioccolato svizzero) is chocolate produced in Switzerland. Switzerland's chocolates have earned an international reputation for high quality with many famous international chocolate brands.

Switzerland is particularly renowned for its milk chocolate, the most consumed type of chocolate. In 1875, a Swiss confectioner, Daniel Peter, developed the first solid milk chocolate using condensed milk, which had been invented by Henri Nestlé, who was Peter's neighbour in Vevey.

In addition to milk, a wide variety of ingredients other than cocoa are used to make the most popular chocolate bars. They notably include nuts (mostly hazelnuts and almonds) and dried fruits (raisins).

== History ==
The 17th century saw the start of chocolate processed in Switzerland. In the 18th century chocolate was only produced in a few areas, such as Ticino.

The early 19th century saw the first mechanized chocolate factories, all in western Switzerland. Among the pioneering industrials were François-Louis Cailler, Philippe Suchard and Charles-Amédée Kohler.

In the second half of the 19th century, Swiss chocolate started to spread abroad. Closely linked to this was the invention of milk chocolate by Daniel Peter in Vevey and the invention of conching by Rodolphe Lindt. Most large chocolate factories were founded in the 19th and early-20th centuries.

=== Early history ===
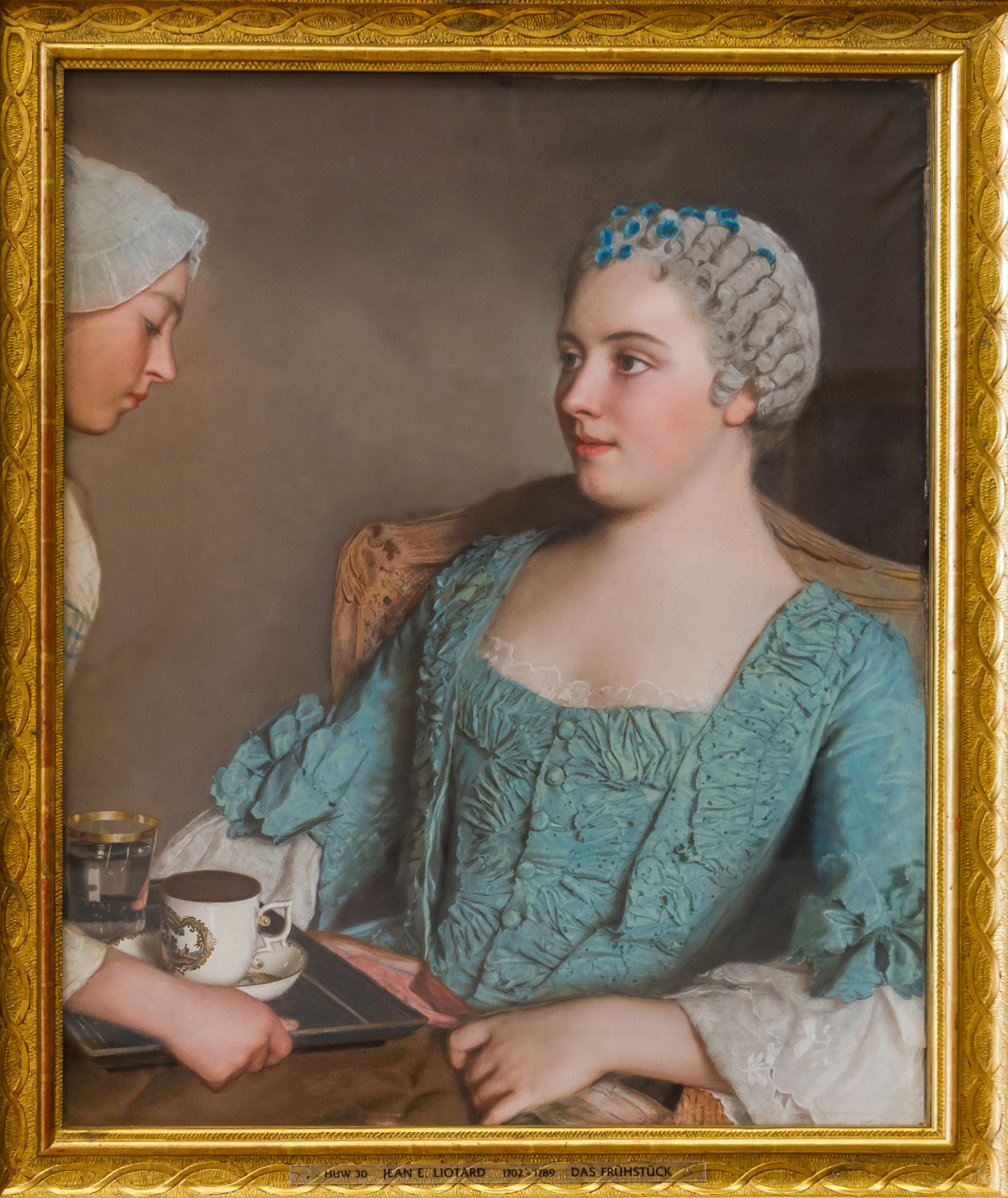
A lady being served chocolate (1754 painting by Jean-Étienne Liotard)

Brought from Mexico to Europe by Hernán Cortés in 1528, cocoa beans and chocolate finally reached Switzerland in the 17th century. In the 18th century, hydraulic mills were already used in the production of chocolate in Switzerland, for instance the Schermenmühle in Bern around 1750. However, most of the chocolate made at the time was mainly the work of Italian and French migrant artisans, active in Ticino (Val Blenio) and Vaud. A company was founded in 1767 in Vevey (see below), another one in 1788 in Morges. Two were founded in Lausanne in 1792. At that time, chocolate was essentially consumed as a drink and transport of cocoa beans was slow and difficult, therefore making the product very expensive. It is unclear when chocolate bars meant for raw consumption were made for the first time. It is known, however, that chocolate was also eaten in the form of bark or pastilles (instead of being grated into drinks) by the end of the 18th century.

In the early 18th century, chocolate was still an artisan product. The chocolatiers (cioccolatieri) of the Val Blenio, in Ticino, are a particularly notable example. They migrated throughout Europe and created a network of small shops and cafés, where chocolate was sold and could be consumed. In the early 20th century, the Cima Norma Factory would be founded by returning emigrants. Earlier, in 1819, a chocolatier from the Val Blenio, Giovanni Martino Bianchini, founded a factory in Turin (Italy) which would be used by Caffarel.

On the other hand, Vevey, in the canton of Vaud, would become a major center of the Swiss chocolate industry. The first well documented chocolate production in Switzerland is that of Philippe Loup and Benjamin Rossier, who started manufacturing chocolate in 1767. Two years later, their production was mechanized using the water-powered Clergère mill. They also obtained a ten-year Privilegium Exclusivum by the Bernese authorities. The cocoa beans were ground and blended with molasses. The hardened paste was then cut into cakes and delivered wrapped in a simple sheet of paper. Loup and Rossier would quickly face competition by numerous other chocolate producers in the region. By 1806, seven chocolate manufacturers were counted in the district of Vevey alone. Together, these seven companies produced about 450 (old) quintals of chocolate yearly (approx. 22 500 kg), of which the 7/8 was exported abroad, essentially in other Swiss cantons but also in France and Germany.

=== 19th century ===
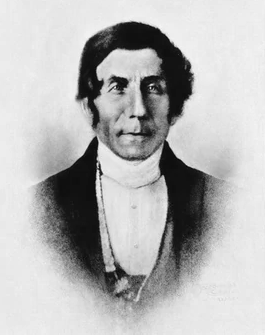
François-Louis Cailler: tablets

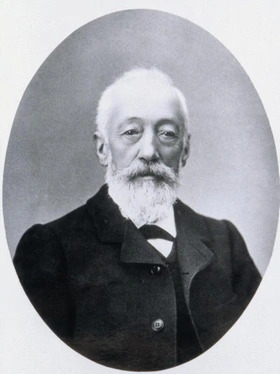
Daniel Peter: milk chocolate

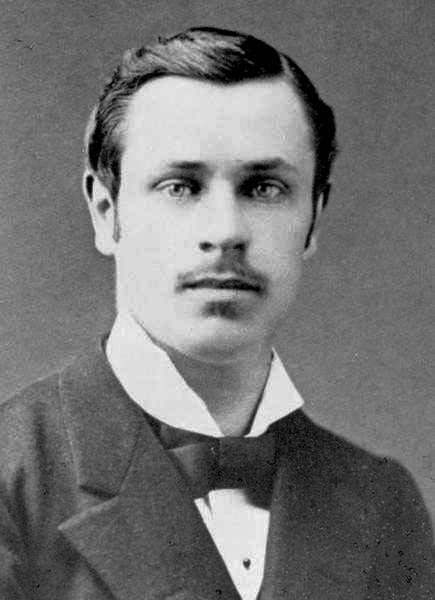
Rodolphe Lindt: conching

In 1819, Swiss grocer and chocolatier François-Louis Cailler, inspired by the Ticinese chocolatiers, founded Cailler and opened a sophisticated and water-powered chocolate factory in Vevey, which allowed him to produce solid chocolate that was molded into tablets. He is sometimes credited for their introduction, although those had probably been made earlier. After a few years, sixteen different sorts of chocolate with different packagings were proposed. Shortly after, in 1826, another Swiss chocolatier, Philippe Suchard, opened a chocolate factory in Neuchâtel where he developed a millstone machine to mix sugar and cocoa: the melanger, which is still used today. Before opening his factory, Suchard realized that a small tablet sold at a pharmacy was worth three days' wages.

A few years later another chocolate factory was founded by Charles-Amédée Kohler in Lausanne: Chocolat Kohler. One of the main specialties of the company was hazelnut chocolate, made since the beginning in 1830. Hazelnut chocolate was the precursor of all combination chocolate bars. The Kohler company is also the creator of the Branche, which ultimately became one of the most popular candy bars on the Swiss market.

In 1875, the Swiss entrepreneur Daniel Peter, based in Vevey and related to the Cailler family, first successfully combined cocoa mass, cocoa butter, and sugar with condensed milk, recently created by his neighbour and friend Henri Nestlé, to produce milk chocolate. However, it is only after many years of fine-tuning that the original formula was developed and, in 1887, the Gala Peter brand was finally launched. Daniel Peter called his product 'Gala' after the Greek word meaning 'milk'.

Meanwhile, the chocolate industry was again revolutionized by another Swiss chocolatier, Rodolphe Lindt from Bern, who developed conching in 1879. The conching process allowed the production of a chocolate with superior aroma and melting characteristics compared to other processes used at that time. The Lindt chocolate company states that Lindt (perhaps mistakenly) allowed a mixer containing chocolate to run over a weekend (or possibly overnight, according to other variants of the possibly apocryphal story). Upon returning to the device, Lindt recognised the final product to have different properties to conventionally produced chocolate at the time, with a less granular texture and greater shine than conventional chocolate at the time, which was generally gritty when solidified owing to the presence of non-ideal cocoa butter crystals. Lindt's invention made the mass-production of chocolate bars more practical, eventually replacing chocolate beverages as the primary means of mass chocolate consumption.

The new conching technique and the success of Gala Peter in particular opened a breach into which all the manufacturers rushed. Not only did milk soften the bitterness of chocolate and refined its taste, but it also lowered its production cost due to a lower cocoa content; milk is a widely available resource in Switzerland. As a consequence, Peter's recipe leaked to other nearby manufacturers: Cailler and Kohler. In 1898, Cailler opened its new factory at Broc, where milk chocolate began to be produced on a large scale. Peter also opened a larger factory at Orbe in 1901, before merging with Kohler. The same year, Suchard launched the Milka brand; Carl Russ-Suchard had previously developed a first milk bar in 1896. The chocolate industry also expanded in the late nineteenth century with the establishment of new companies, such as Frey and Tobler.

=== 20th and 21st century ===
From these developments, Switzerland soon dominated the chocolate market. Production increased dramatically, and by 1905, the country was producing 15,000 tonnes (15,000 long tons; 17,000 short tons) of chocolate, a vast proportion of it exported. As a result of the increasing popularity of chocolate, world cocoa consumption began to grow extraordinarily. To meet these demands, cocoa production expanded, notably in West Africa, where the Forastero variety began to be mass cultivated in the early twentieth century. Although considered inferior to the Criollo variety, the Forastero type bean is more suited for the manufacture of milk chocolate and is cheaper to produce owing to its higher yields. Conversely, milk became the critical ingredient. Unlike cocoa and sugar, milk spoils quickly, therefore it cannot be stored for long periods of time. This favoured the implantation of large factories (as well as new populations of workers) in the countryside, where abundant fresh milk supplies are readily available. The Cailler factory of Broc is a typical example.

The Union libre des fabricants suisses de chocolat ("free association of Swiss chocolate manufacturers") was founded in 1901. It gave birth to Chocosuisse, the umbrella association of chocolate manufacturers in Switzerland.

Swiss chocolate consumption increased dramatically from the beginning to the end of the 20th century, from about 1 kg to 12 kg per capita per annum.

Although partly developed outside Switzerland, white and ruby chocolate were also invented by Swiss-based chocolate manufacturers Nestlé and Barry Callebaut, in 1936 and 2017 respectively.

=== Timeline of chocolate factories foundations ===
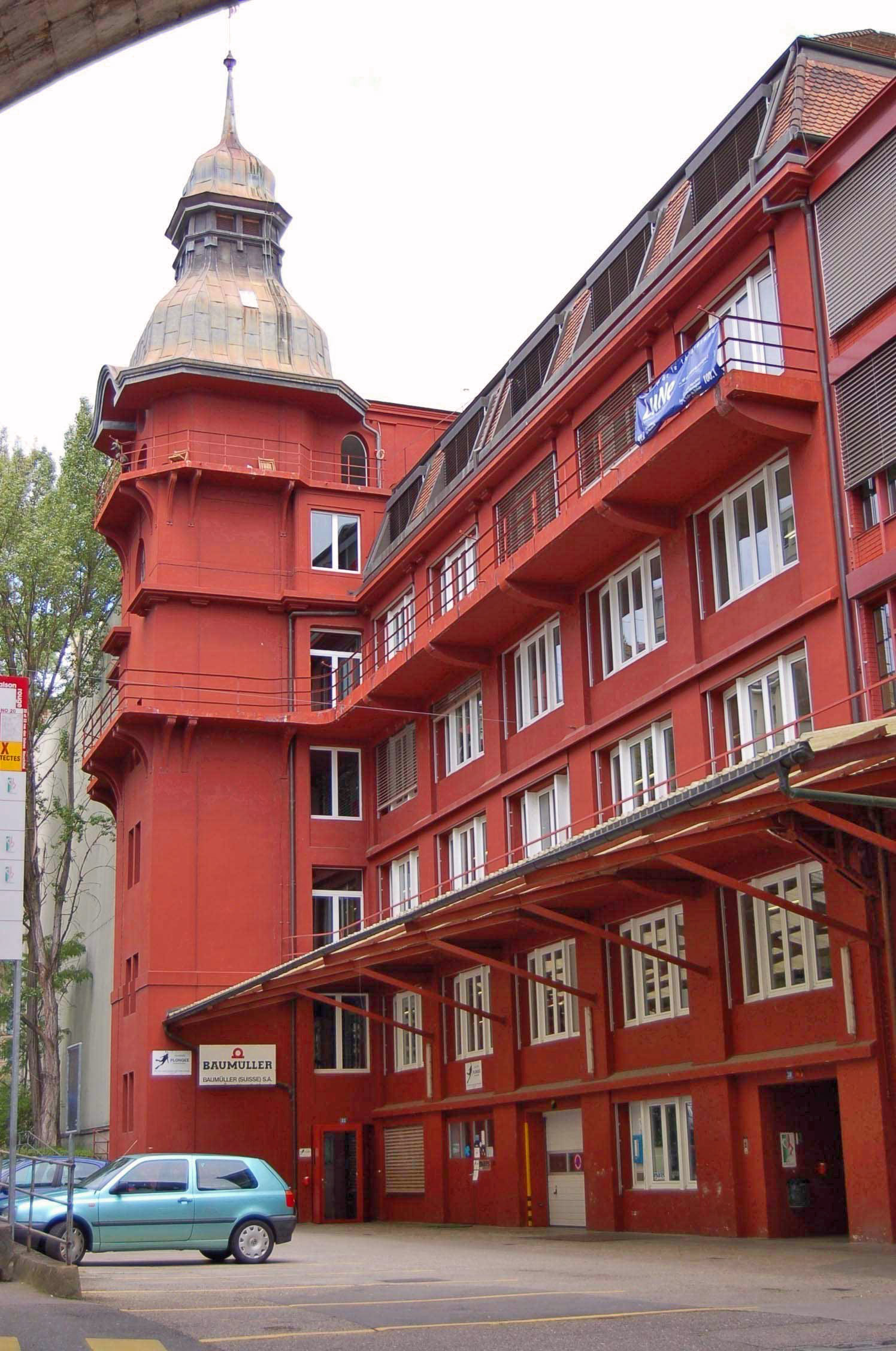
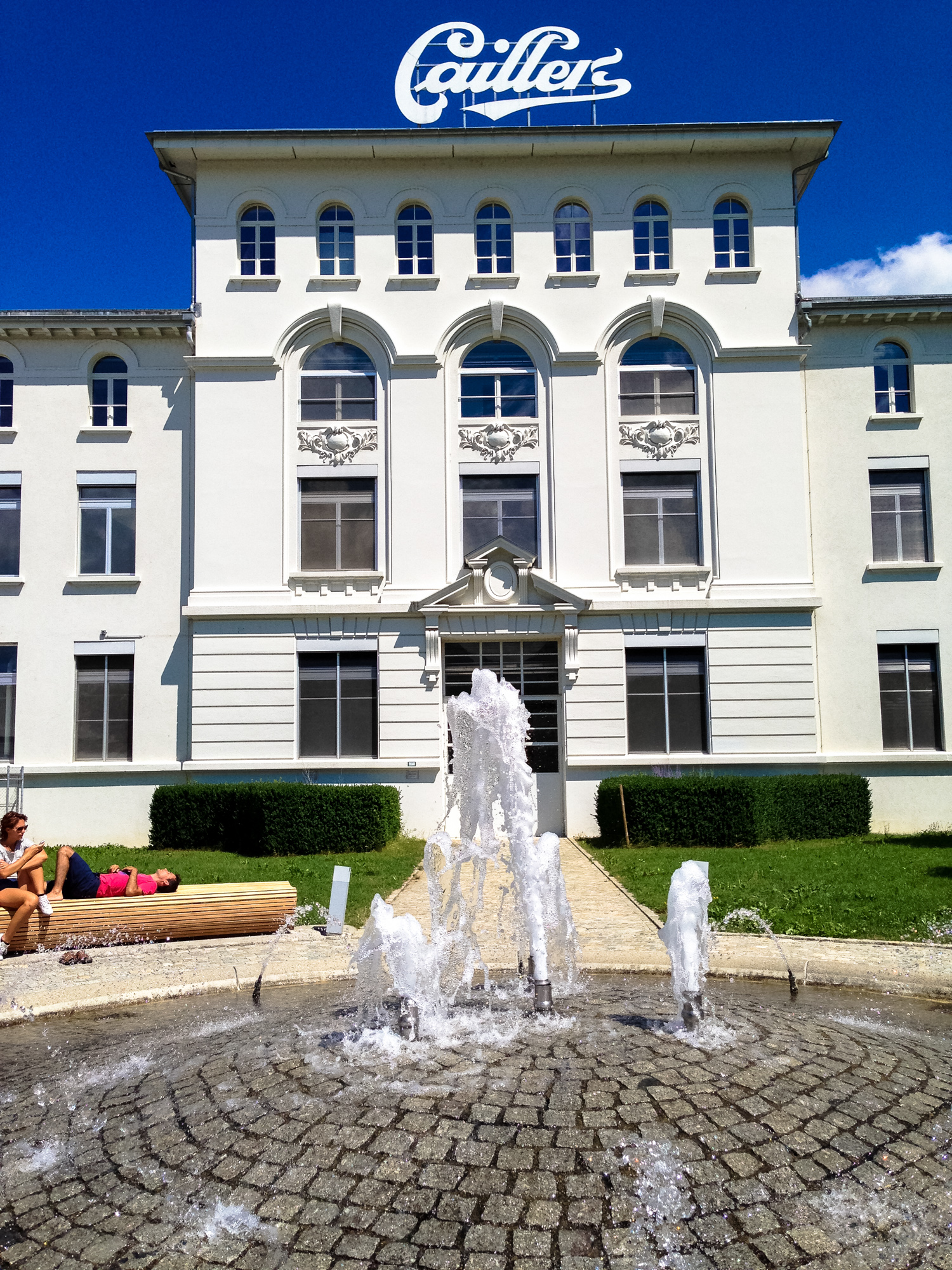
Two generations of chocolate factories: Suchard in Neuchâtel (1826, built for the production of plain chocolate) and Cailler in Broc (1898, built for the production of milk chocolate). While the first one is set in an urban context, the second one is set in the countryside to benefit from fresh milk supplies.
- 1815 - Chocolats+Croisier
- 1819 – Cailler in Vevey (today Nestlé)
- 1826 – Favarger in Versoix, Canton of Geneva
- 1826 – Suchard in Serrières (today Kraft Foods)
- 1830 – Kohler in Lausanne (today Nestlé)
- 1836 – Sprüngli in Zurich, company split into Confiserie Sprüngli and Lindt & Sprüngli in 1892
- 1852 – Maestrani in Luzern (today in Flawil)
- 1856 – Klaus in Le Locle, Canton of Neuchâtel
- 1867 – Peter in Vevey (today Nestlé)
- 1879 – Lindt in Bern (today Lindt & Sprüngli)
- 1887 – Frey in Aarau (today Migros)
- 1899 – Tobler in Bern (today Kraft Foods)
- 1901 – Villars in Villars sur Glâne
- 1903 – Cima-Norma in Torre (closed in 1968)
- 1908 – Felchlin in Schwyz
- 1928 – Stella SA in Lugano (from 1987 in Giubiasco)
- 1929 – Camille Bloch in Courtelary
- 1932 – Teuscher in Zurich
- 1932 – Bernrain in Kreuzlingen
- 1933 – Halba in Wallisellen (today Coop)
- 1934 – Kägi Söhne in Toggenburg
- 1957 – Alprose in Caslano
- 1962 – Läderach in Ennenda

== Chocolate products ==
Chocolate produced in Switzerland can take a wide variety of shapes. The most common products are chocolate tablets (typically standard 100 g bars) and individual bars. These are either plain or made with other ingredients, such as hazelnuts and almonds, in more or less elaborated ways. Chocolate eggs, bunnies, or figurines are also made by most manufacturers during Easter and Christmas.

Most of the chocolate produced is milk chocolate, followed by dark and white chocolate. Chocolate specialties like ganache and praline/gianduja are often used for filled bars, combinations bars, truffles and pralines. In addition to being popular, hazelnut specialties (like gianduja) help minimize the amount of cocoa, historically an expensive ingredient, in the finished product. The Branche, a praline-filled bar, is a typical example of a combination of chocolate and hazelnuts.

The primary ingredient, cocoa, is not grown in Switzerland; only anecdotal quantities of chocolate using fully indigenous ingredients have been made to date. Cocoa is essentially imported from West Africa. The other common ingredient, milk, is widely available in the country, which has a long dairy farming tradition. Milk ingredients are complex and critical in delivering the properties and taste to milk chocolate. Milk-origin (terroir) and associated farming have become an important marketing topic.

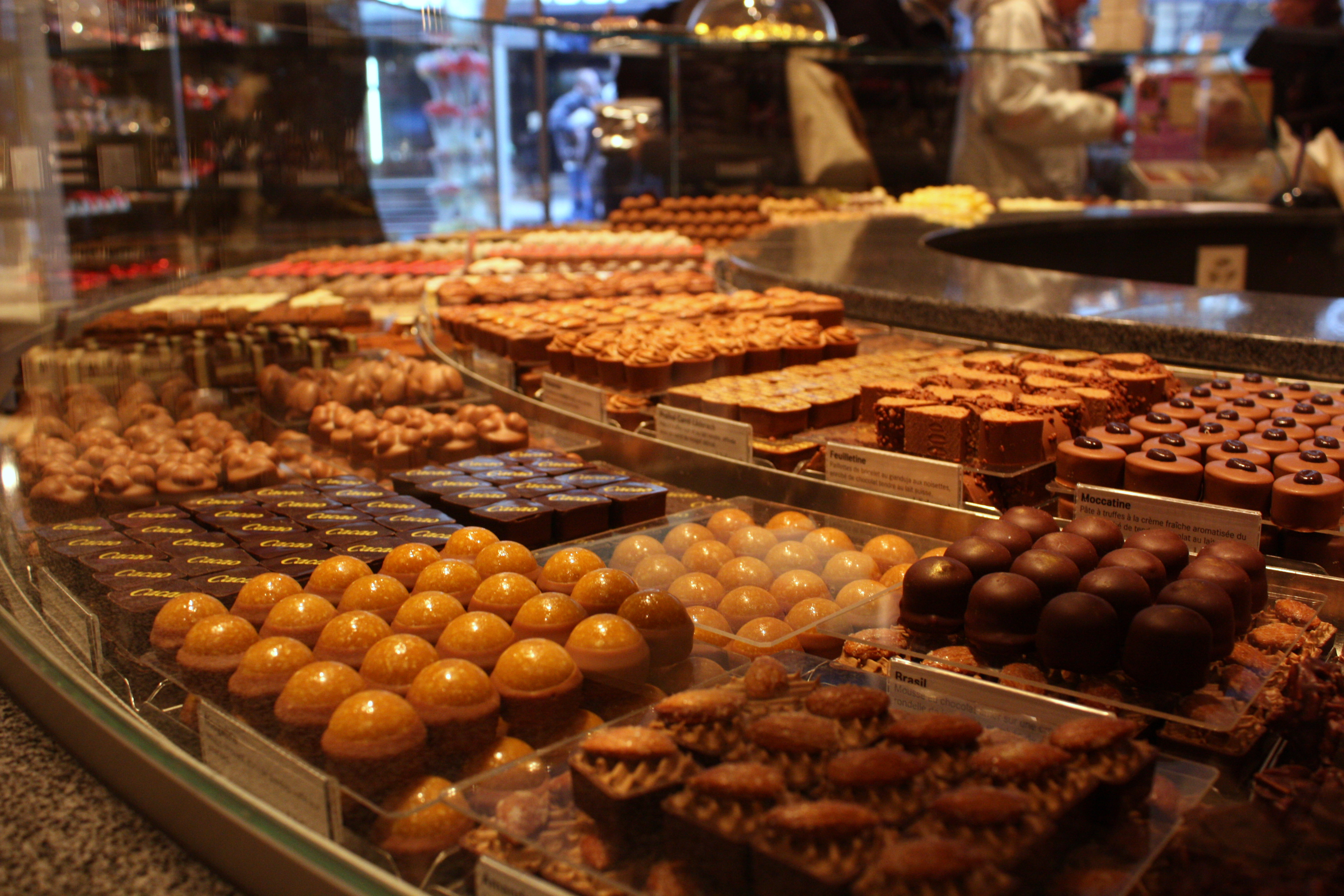
Truffles and pralines

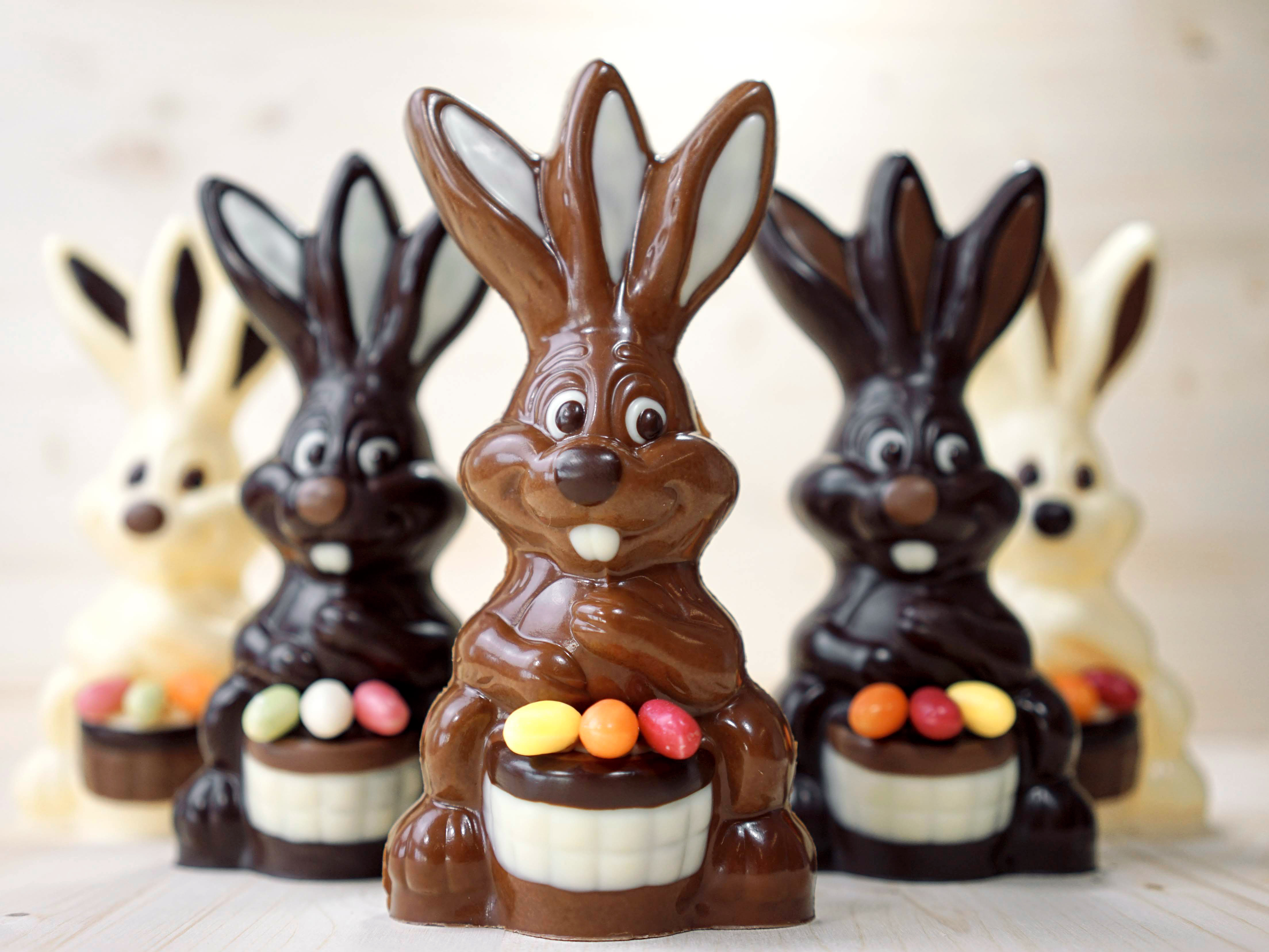
Easter bunnies

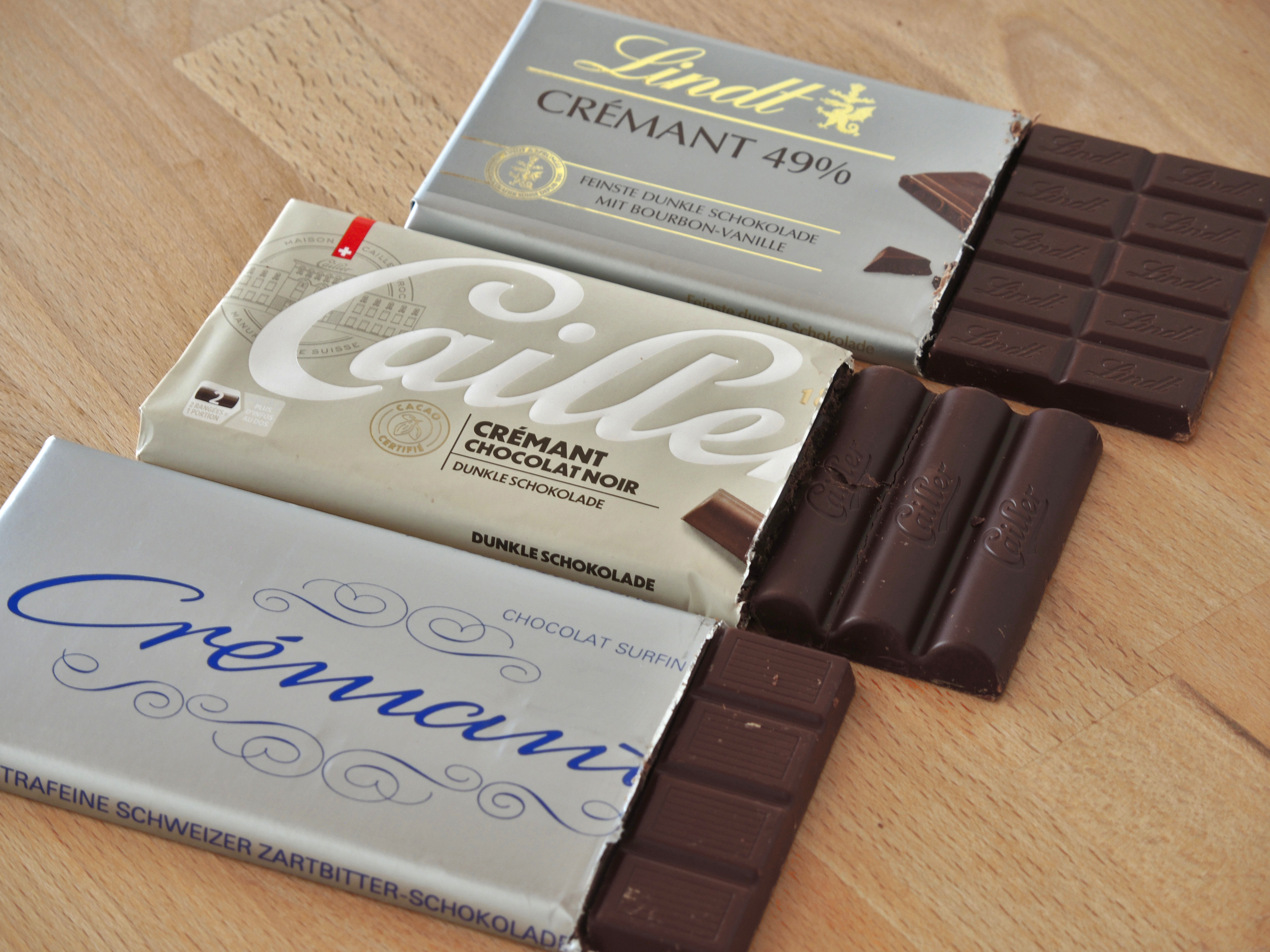
Consumer dark (crémant) chocolate

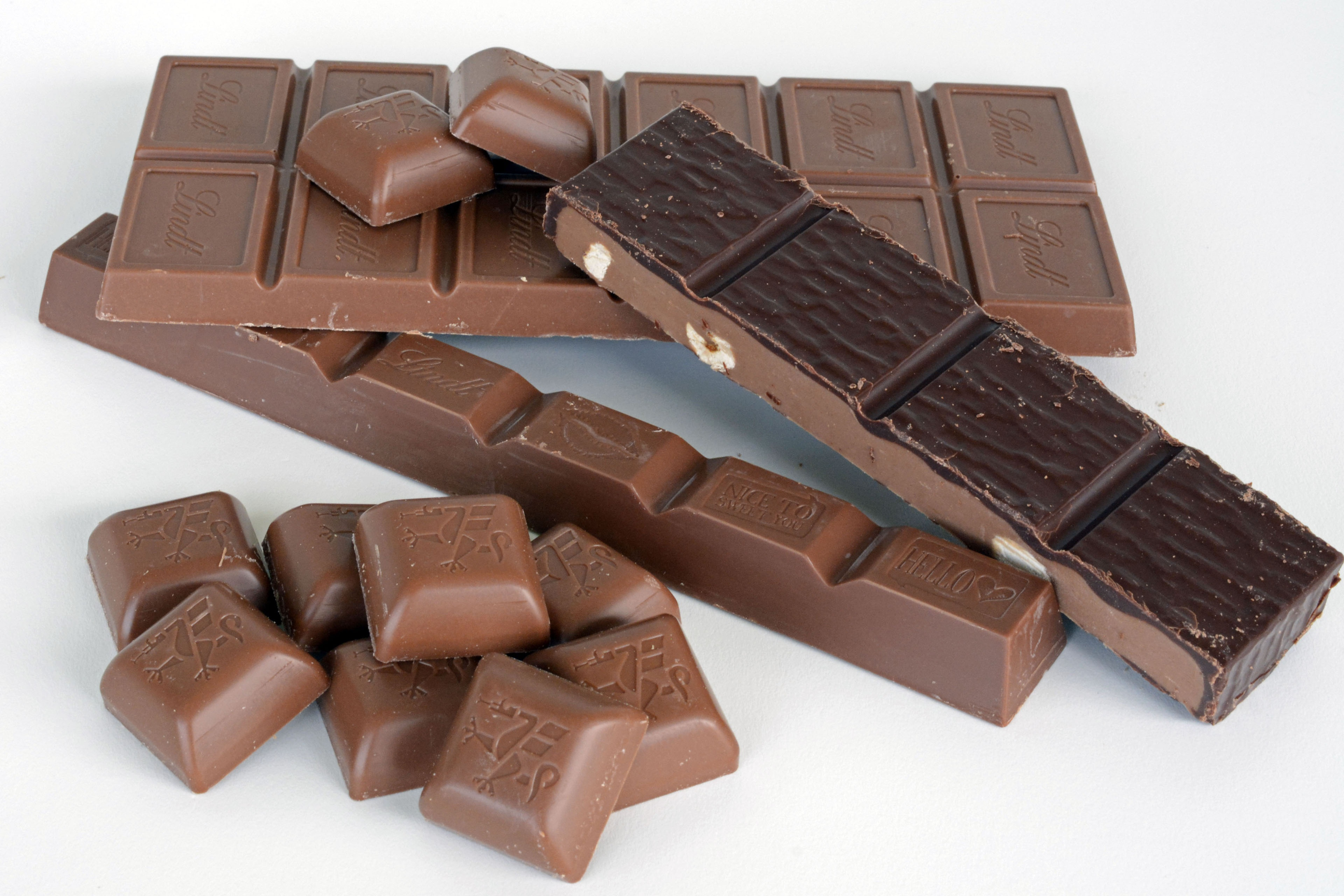
Consumer milk chocolate

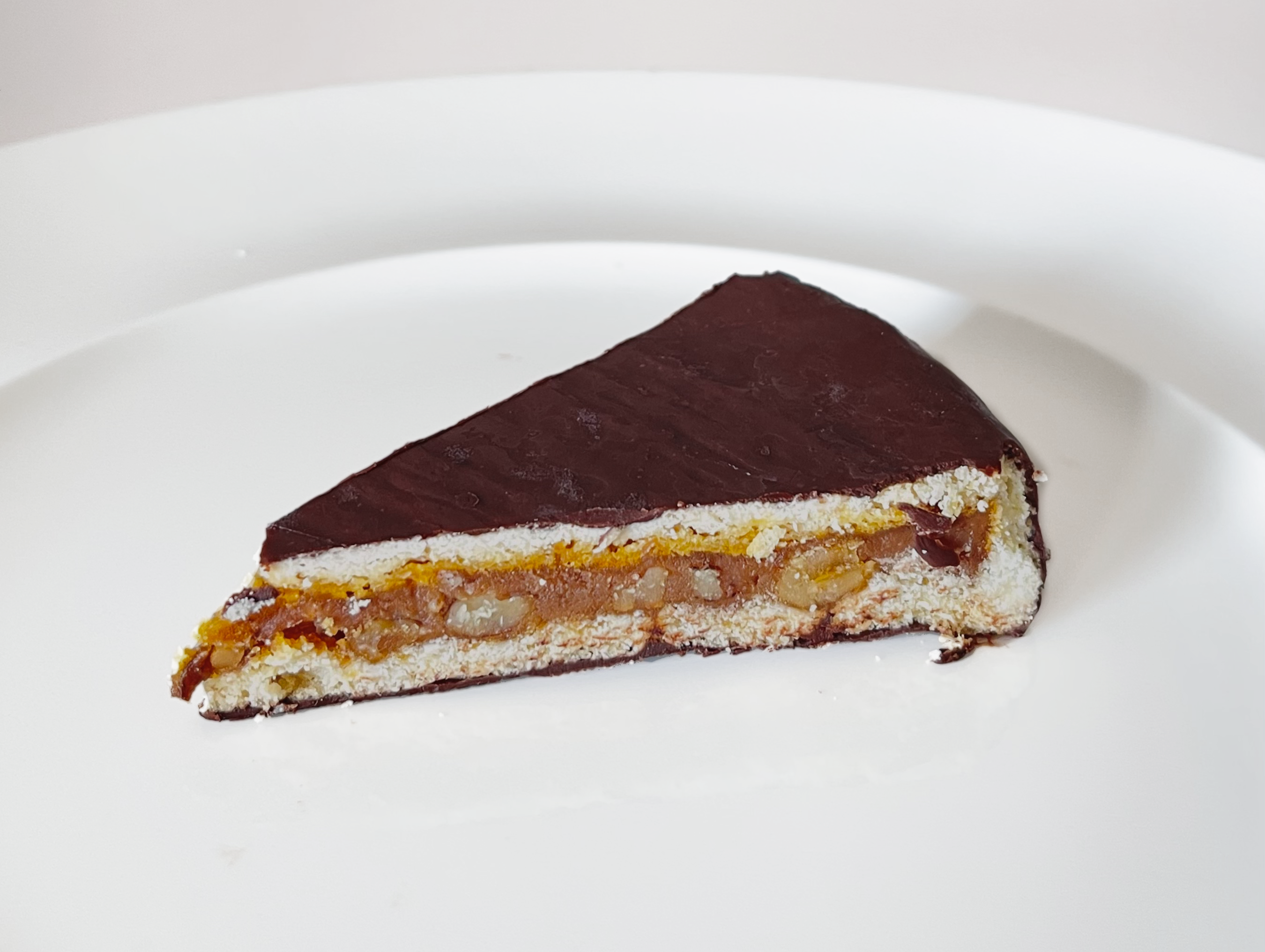
Chocolate-coated cake from Bulle

== Sales market ==
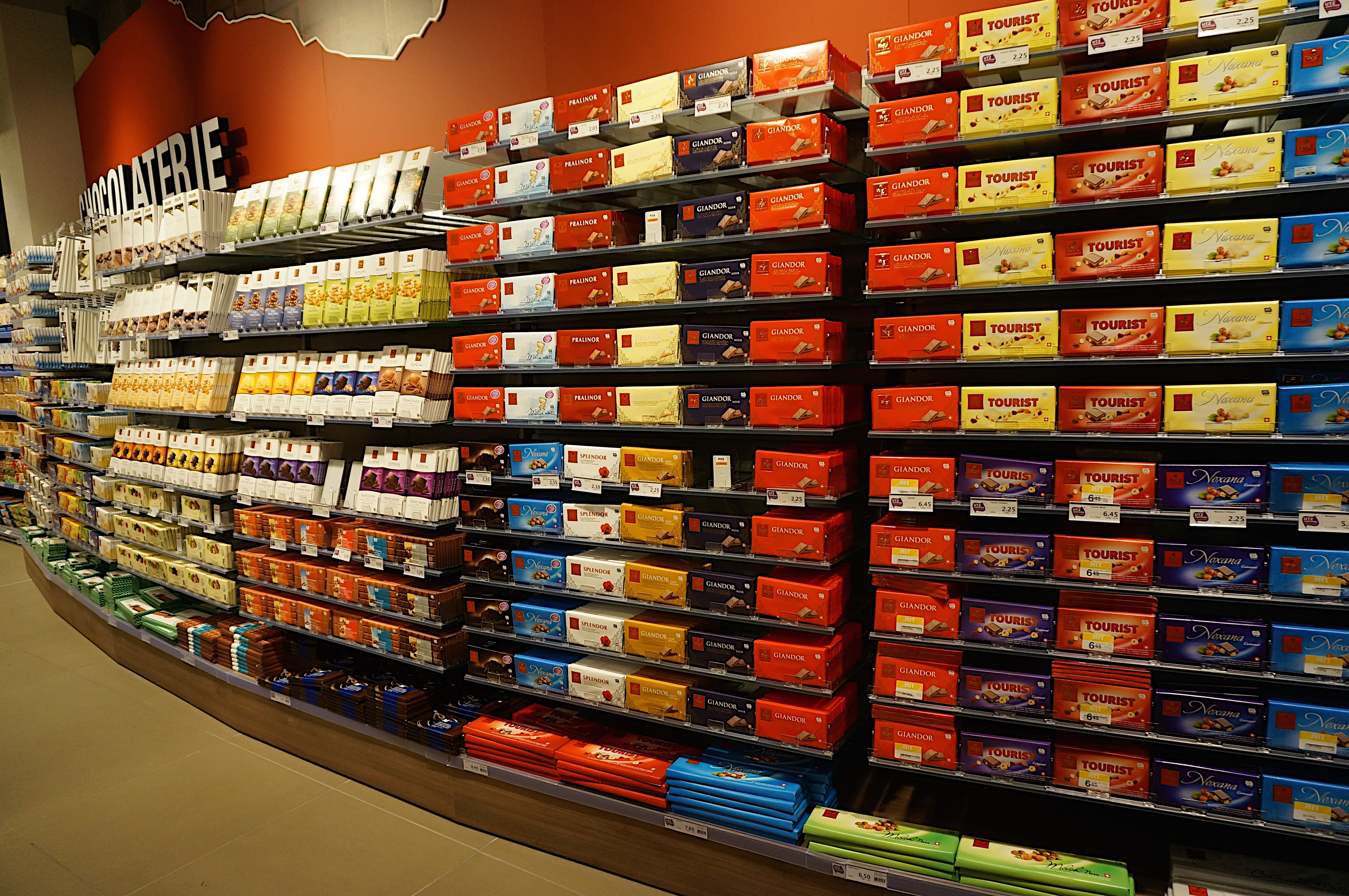
A chocolate department in a Migros supermarket

From the 19th century until the First World War and throughout the Second World War the Swiss chocolate industry was very export-oriented. After the Second World War Switzerland began to outsource production due to commercial restrictions.

Today most Swiss chocolate is consumed by the Swiss themselves (54% in 2000), and Switzerland has the highest per capita rate of chocolate consumption worldwide (11.6 kg (25.6 lbs.) per capita per annum). (Note: Cross-country comparisons of chocolate consumption are difficult to make. Some countries do not count white chocolate, while others include any confectionery product containing chocolate.)

In 2004, 148,270 tonnes of chocolate were produced in Switzerland. 53% of this was exported (20% to Germany, 11% to France and Great Britain and 13% to North America). The gross income of the Swiss chocolate industry in 2004 was 1.37 billion CHF (814 million from the local market, 551 million from exports).

In 2019, around 200,000 tonnes of chocolate were produced in Switzerland, amounting to almost 1.79 billion CHF in sales. 74% of this was exported (32.7% to Germany, 10% to France and 14.7% to North America).

=== Advertising ===
Since the expansion of the chocolate industry following the invention of milk chocolate, Swiss chocolate has been heavily advertised using images of Alpine sceneries (often with the Matterhorn) and dairy farming traditions. This replaced the typical colonial imagery that was used before. Alpine themes eventually became widespread among international chocolate manufacturers.

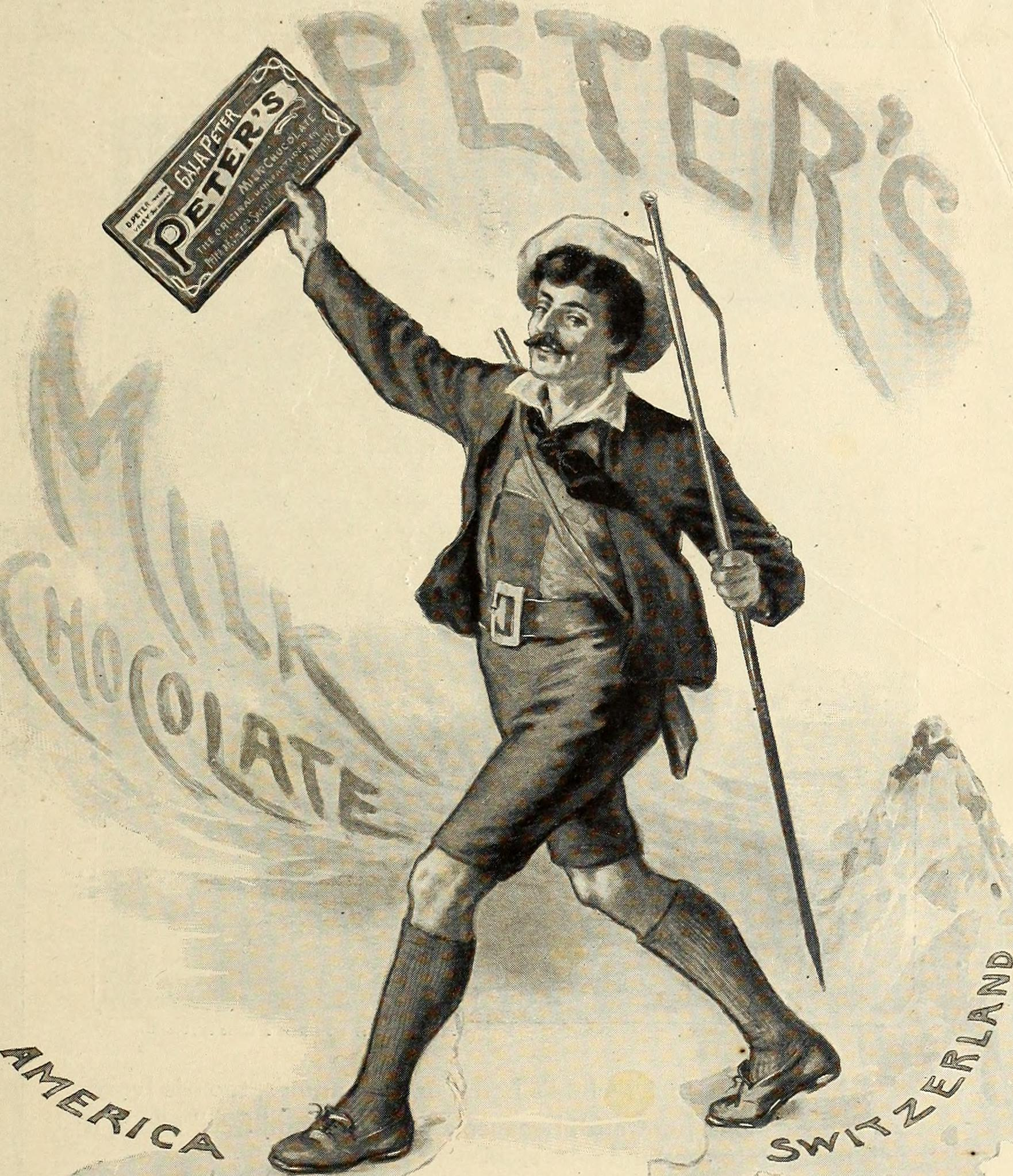
Ad for Peter's Chocolate

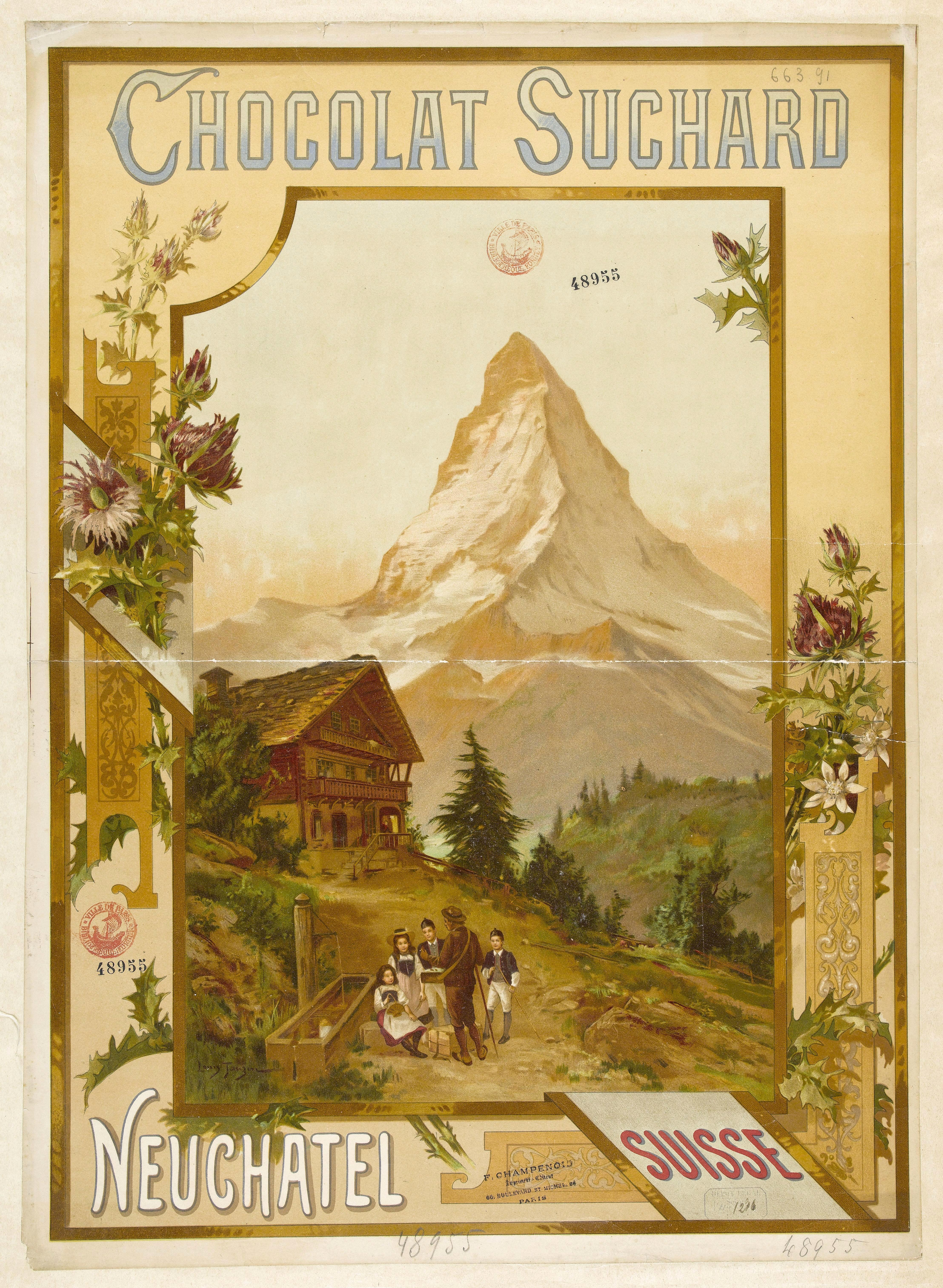
Ad for Suchard

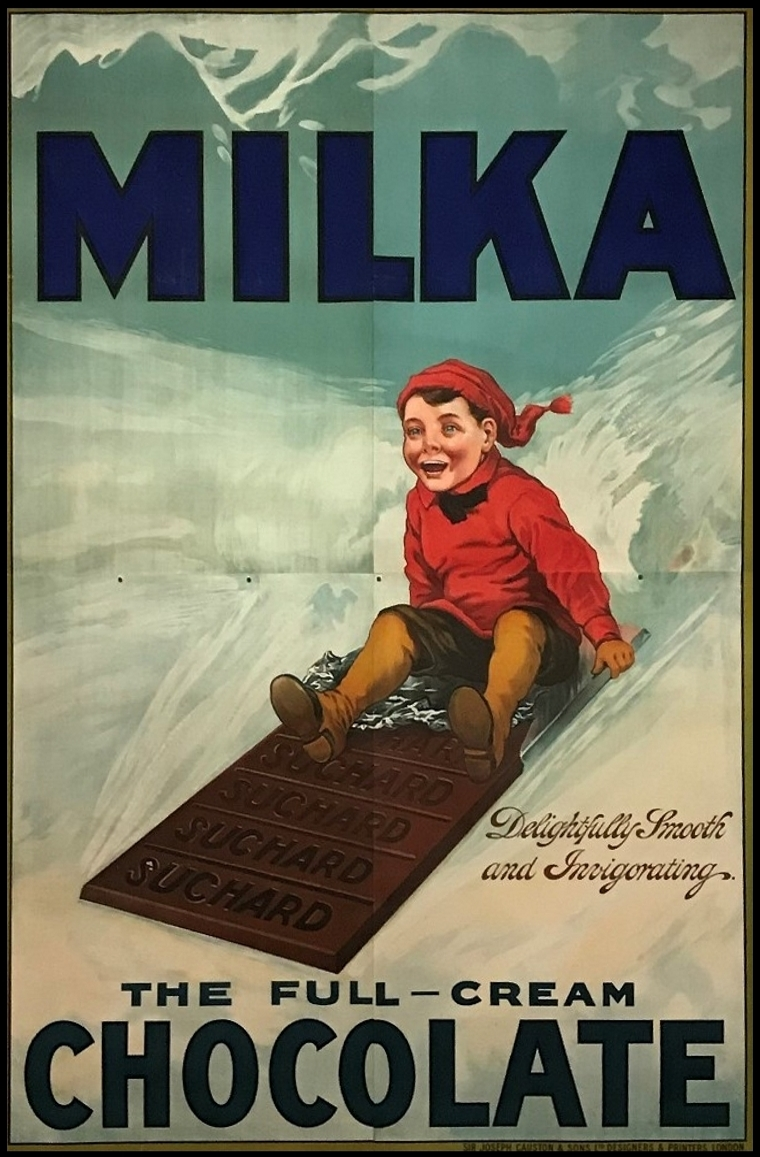
Ad for Milka

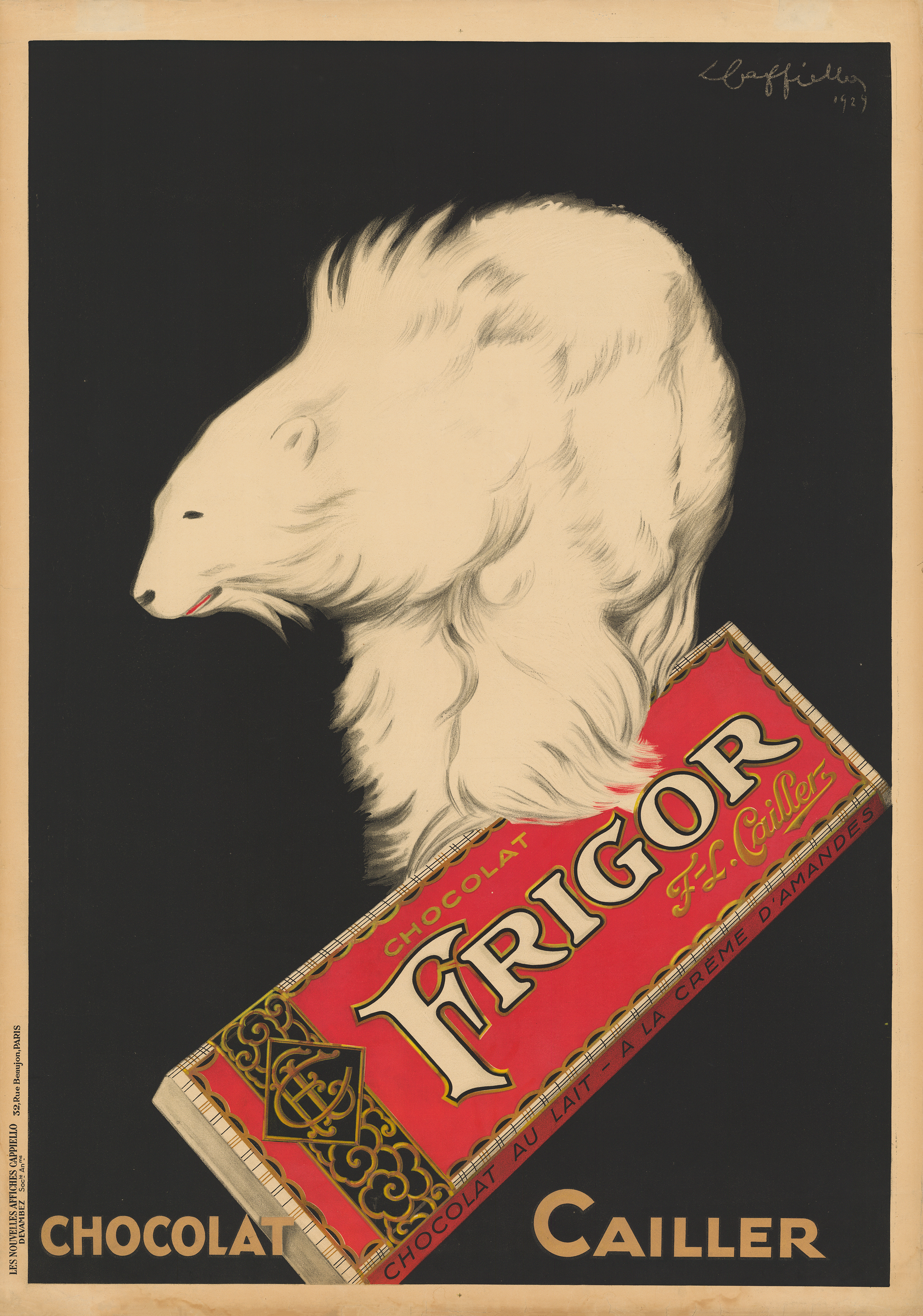
Ad for Cailler

== Industry structure ==
In 1901, Swiss chocolate producers created the Union libre des fabricants suisses de chocolat. In 1916, this was divided into the Chambre syndicale des fabricants suisses de chocolat and the Convention chocolatière suisse. The former "Chambre syndicale" (today the Chocosuisse) protects the interests of Swiss chocolate producers. The "Convention chocolatière" focused on the quality of the chocolate and sought a uniform price strategy. In 1994 the Convention was disbanded.

== Tourism ==
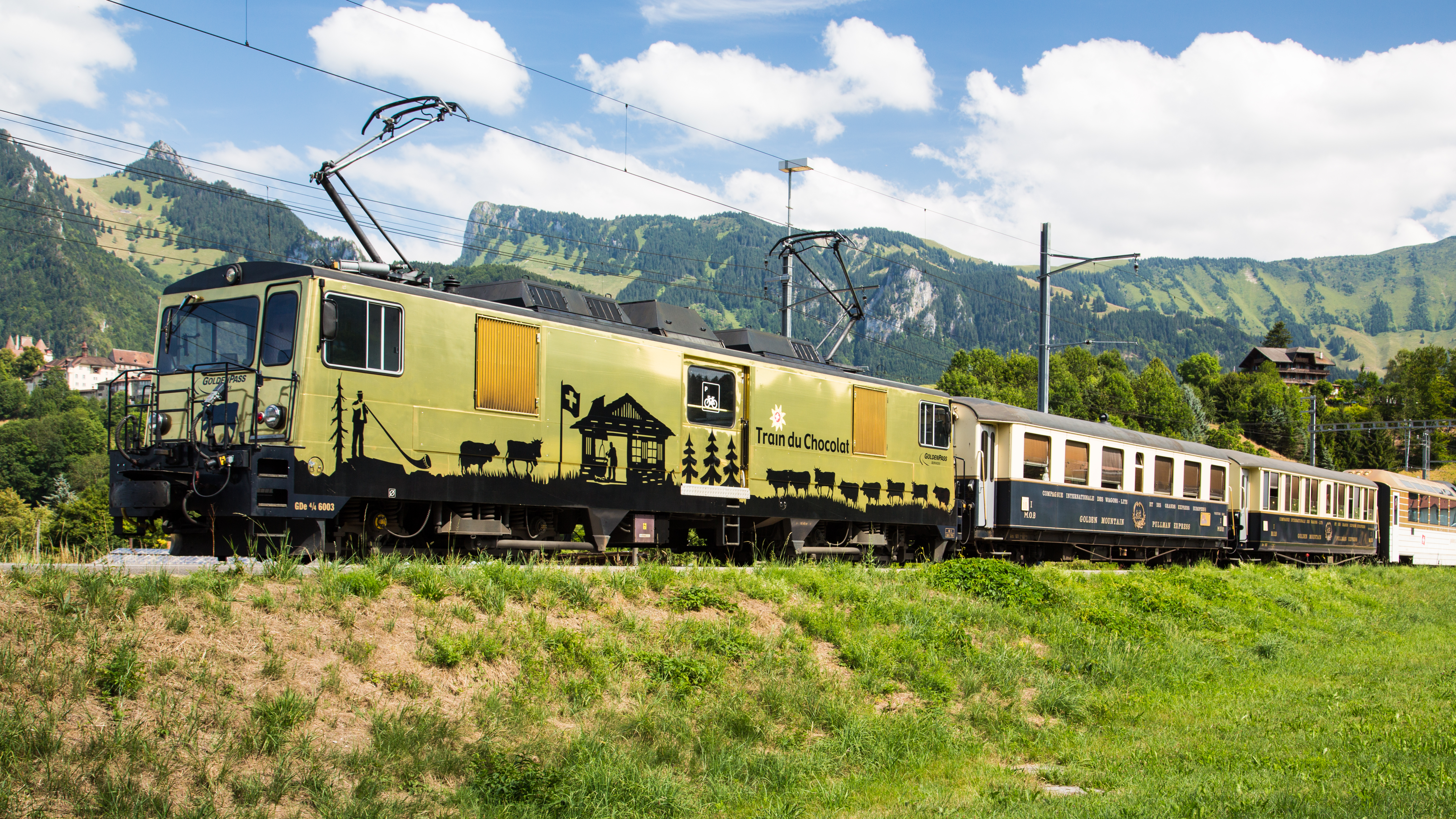
The Montreux–Lenk im Simmental line's Chocolate Train, bringing visitors to the Maison Cailler

Several factories have also become tourist attractions as they include guided tours and chocolate museums. Some of the largest are the Lindt Home of Chocolate in Kilchberg, the Maison Cailler in Broc and the Maestrani's Chocolarium in Flawil.

== See also ==
- Culinary Heritage of Switzerland
- Military chocolate (Switzerland)
