= Chocolat Kohler =

Swiss chocolate brand

- Founded: 1830; 196 years ago in Lausanne, Switzerland
- Founder: Charles-Amédée Kohler and Frédéric Kohler
- Fate: Bought by Nestlé in 1929
- Successor: Brand of Nestlé
- Headquarters: Lausanne, Switzerland
- Products: Chocolate
- Owner: Nestlé

Chocolat Kohler was a chocolate producer based in Lausanne, founded in 1830 by the Kohler brothers. It is currently a brand owned by Nestlé.

Kohler notably introduced hazelnut chocolate, which was perhaps the first combination chocolate bar.

== History ==
The Kohler chocolate factory was among the earliest chocolate manufacturers established in Switzerland, following shortly after the foundation of Cailler. The company was founded in 1830 by Charles-Amédée Kohler and his brother Frédéric Kohler, sons of Amédée Kohler (1761–1833), a merchant who had traded in colonial food products since 1793.

In 1849, Charles-Amédée Kohler acquired the municipal sawmill in the Sauvabelin forest near Lausanne and transferred chocolate production to the site. The new factory took advantage of the hydraulic power of the Flon River to grind cocoa beans. A steam engine was installed a few years later, replacing the hydraulic system and enabling a significant expansion of production capacity.

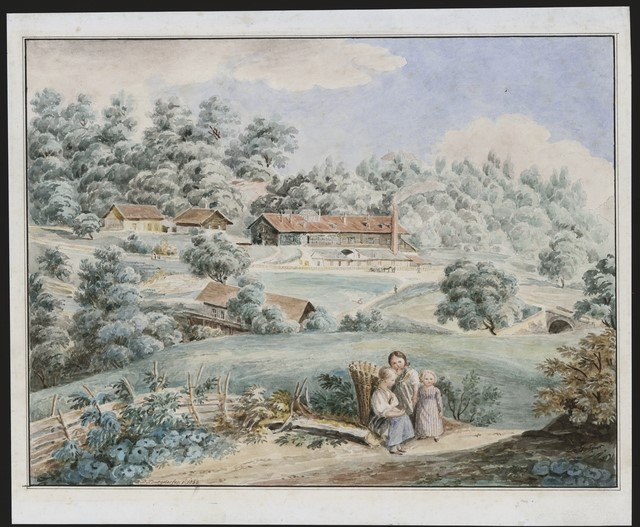
Kohler chocolate factory at Sauvabelin with the mill on the Flon River (1860)

In 1865, Charles-Amédée transferred ownership of the business to his sons, Charles-Amédée II and Adolphe Kohler. The next generation of the family, represented by Amédée-Louis and Jean-Jacques Kohler, subsequently assumed control of the company.

Between 1894 and 1896, the family constructed a new factory in neighbouring Échandens, which remained in operation until 1907. In 1897, milk chocolate began to be manufactured by Kohler after the recipe had leaked from one of Daniel Peter's relatives. In 1904, the company entered into a partnership with Chocolat Peter, managed by Daniel Peter in Orbe, forming the company Peter Kohler. A further merger followed in 1911 with Alexandre Cailler's chocolate business in Vevey, resulting in the creation of Peter, Cailler, Kohler (PCK).

These successive consolidations within the Swiss chocolate industry ultimately led to the acquisition of the brand by Nestlé in 1929.

== Products ==
Ads for hazelnut (1883) and milk (1899) chocolate

One of the company’s main specialties was hazelnut chocolate, known as chocolat à la noisette. Charles-Amédée Kohler is generally credited with introducing it in Switzerland, although it may have been created by other chocolate manufacturers, such as Suchard. Swiss hazelnut chocolate consisted of finely ground hazelnuts incorporated into the chocolate paste, similarly to Italian gianduja.

Charles-Amédée II, the founder’s son, also created the Branche, a praline-filled chocolate and hazelnut bar; the product is described in his recipe book from 1896. The Branche has been produced by Cailler since 1904, and ultimately has become one of the most popular candy bars on the Swiss market.

A recurrent advertisement poster showed a wolf attracted by Little Red Riding Hood's basket, the latter being full of Kohler chocolates. Chocolat Kohler was also advertised by French artist Charles Trenet.

== See also ==
- Swiss chocolate
- List of bean-to-bar chocolate manufacturers
