= Teuscher =

Swiss chocolatier

- Founded: 1932; 94 years ago
- Founder: Dolf Teuscher, Sr.
- Headquarters: Zürich, Switzerland
- Key people: Dolf Teuscher, Jr., Madeleine geb. Teuscher
- Website: www.teuscher.com

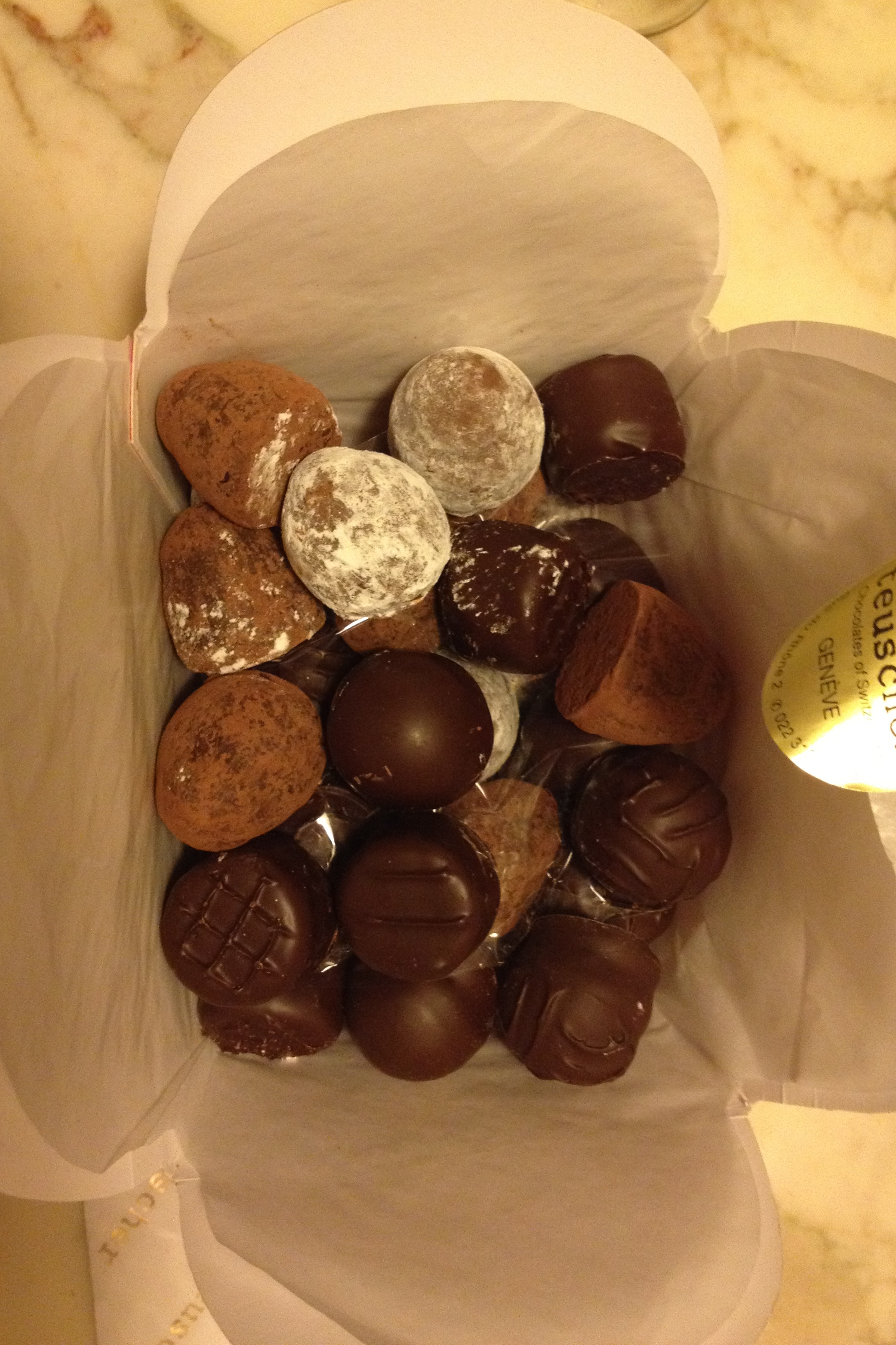
Ballotin of assorted truffles and chocolates

Teuscher is a chocolatier from in Zürich, Switzerland. It was founded in 1932 by Dolf Teuscher, Sr. and its corporate headquarters are in Dübendorf. It former flagship was located on Zürich's famed Storchengasse but now consolidated into Felix Café locations on Bellevueplatz and Bahnhofstrasse. Remaining international outlets are in Seoul, Abu Dhabi and United States (New York City, Chicago, Detroit, Beverly Hills and San Francisco).

The Swiss confectioner hand manufactures over 200 varieties of confections and pastries. Its signature confections are Champagne Truffles, the first of its kind. They are made with champagne, butter cream, and surrounded by dark cream ganache made from 66% dark base chocolate. Each is enrobed in milk chocolate and dusted with confectioner's sugar, or dark chocolate and dusted with bracingly dry unsweetened cocoa powder.

As Swiss confectioners generally do not distinguish themselves from patisseries, the Teuscher brand also creates a wide range of pastries and cookies.

Aside from a wide-ranging selection of truffles, pralines, marzipan and other items, Teuscher also manufactures dark chocolate ranging from 55% to 99% in increments of 11%.

== See also ==
- Swiss chocolate
- List of bean-to-bar chocolate manufacturers
