= Chokito =

Brand of chocolate bar

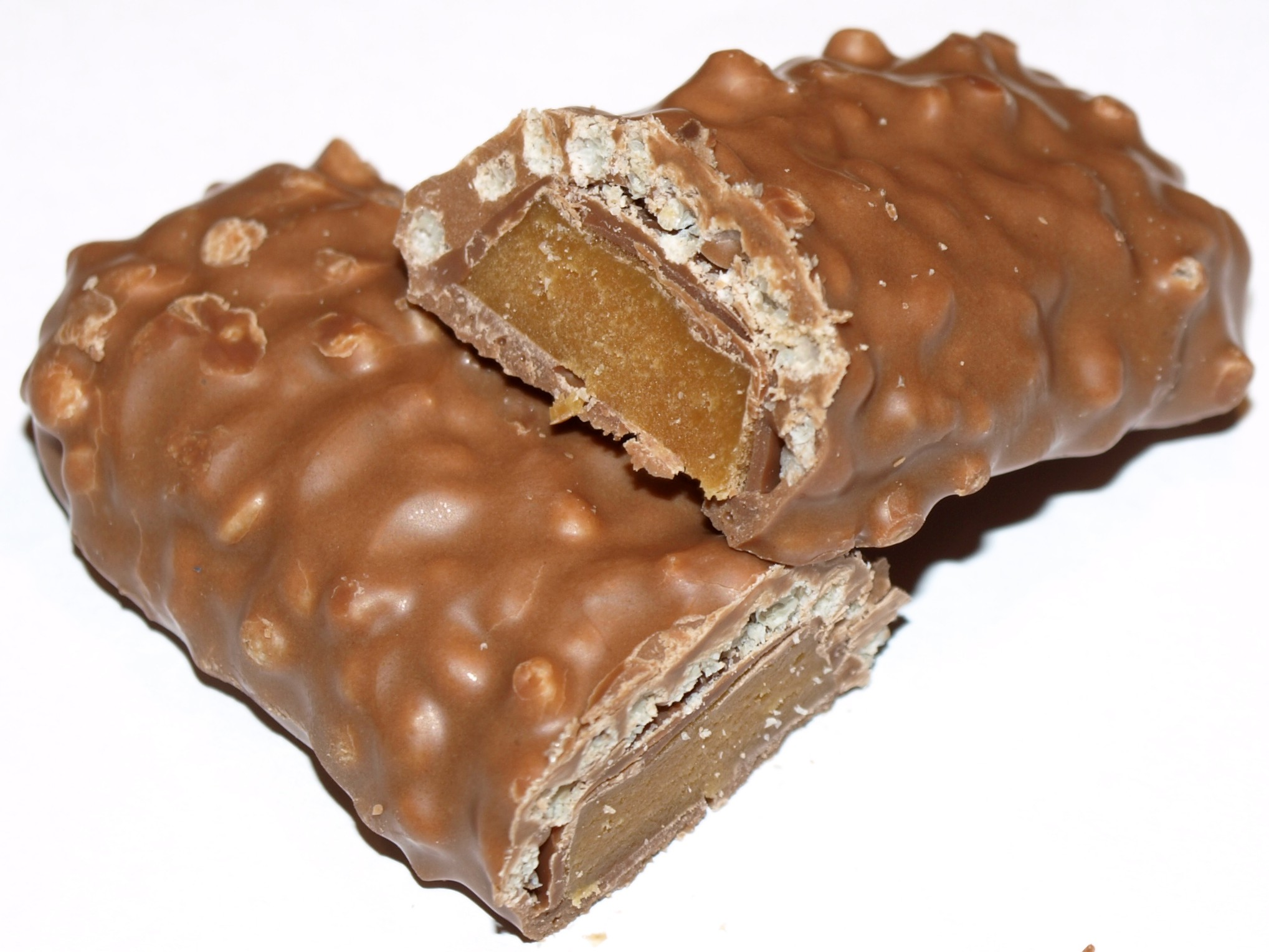
- A Chokito bar and its wrapper
- Product type: Chocolate bar
- Current owner: Nestlé
- Country: Switzerland
- Introduced: 1964; 62 years ago
- Markets: Europe, South America, Oceania
- Website: nestle.com.au/chokito

Chokito is a combination chocolate bar brand, created and owned by Nestlé. The original bar consists of an ingot-shaped caramel fudge center, with a coating of milk chocolate and crisped rice on the outside. It is manufactured by Nestlé in Switzerland, Brazil, and Australia.

The Chokito bar is originally made in Switzerland at the Nestlé-owned Cailler factory in Broc since 1964, as a modernized version of the long-established Branche chocolate bar, to counter competition from other brands. Shortly after, in 1965, a modified version was launched in the United Kingdom. The bar became very popular on the Swiss market and soon faced competition from Frey, who introduced the equivalent Risoletto in 1967. The chocolate bar was then launched in Australia in 1968 and Brazil in the 1970s. In 2018, Swiss production was relocated elsewhere in Switzerland.

== Advertising ==
Chokito was marketed by Nestlé South Africa during the late 1960s, but was withdrawn from that market in the early 1980s.

In 2010, Chokito was relaunched in Australia with redesigned packaging and a reformulated recipe. As part of the reformulation, the product moved away from the use of compound chocolate that had featured in the original recipe.

The relaunch was accompanied by a new advertising campaign centred on a character acting as a bouncer, preventing people from entering locations such as bathrooms and gyms while repeating the slogan "No no no". The campaign was aimed primarily at men aged 24 to 35 and reportedly received more than 380,000 views within two weeks on platforms including YouTube and Break.com.

The reformulated version of Chokito was introduced to the New Zealand market in 2012.

The current advertising slogan for Chokito in Australia is "big feed, big taste". During the 1970s, the product was promoted using the tagline "Chokito gets you going".

== See also ==
- 100 Grand Bar, a similar chocolate bar also introduced by Nestlé in 1964
- Crunch, another crisped rice bar from Nestlé
- List of Nestlé brands
