= François-Louis Cailler =

Swiss chocolatier (1796–1852)

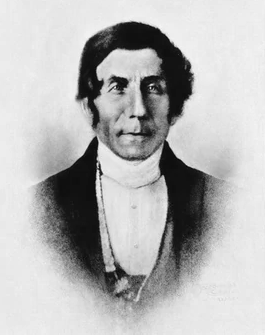
- Born: 11 June 1796; Vevey, Switzerland
- Died: 6 April 1852 (aged 55); Corsier-sur-Vevey, Switzerland
- Occupation: Chocolatier
- Known for: Founder of the oldest chocolate brand in Switzerland still in existence
- Relatives: Daniel Peter (son-in-law)

François-Louis Cailler (11 June 1796 – 6 April 1852) was a Swiss entrepreneur and early chocolatier who founded Cailler, the first modern brand of Swiss chocolate and the oldest still in existence, in 1819.

== Biography ==
Cailler was born in Vevey, in the canton of Vaud, on 11 June 1796, in a family originally from Daillens. After an apprenticeship as a grocer in Vevey, he travelled to northern Italy where, in Turin, he learned the art of chocolate-making from Ticinese chocolatiers based there.

After returning to Switzerland in 1818, Cailler began a partnership with Abram L.C. Cusin of Aubonne, operating a grocery business in Vevey under the name of Cailler & Cusin. The following year, in 1819, he set up a chocolate factory in a converted former mill, in Corsier, near Vevey, thus establishing what would become the Cailler company, and the world’s first mechanised chocolate factory. Cailler perfected a technique to solidify chocolate and make tablets.

Starting in 1820, Cailler rented additional factory space in the area in order to produce chocolate in larger scale. The partnership with Cusin, however, was dissolved the following year, and by 1826 Cailler's business went bankrupt. Around this time he married Louise-Albertine Perret, from Boudry. After the company's recover, Cailler bought two new water powered factories in Corsier-sur-Vevey and Vevey.

He died in Corsier on 6 April 1852. His wife Louise-Albertine continued to run the company along with their sons, Auguste and Alexandre.

== Legacy ==
In 1875, his son-in-law Daniel Peter had the idea of combining the chocolate with his neighbor Henri Nestlé's condensed milk to make milk chocolate. The companies of Peter and Charles-Amédée Kohler, which were already partners, merged with Cailler in 1911, then run by François-Louis' grandson, Alexandre-François-Louis Cailler (1866–1936), to form the firm Peter, Cailler, Kohler, Chocolats Suisses S.A, which was later purchased by the food industry giant Nestlé, in 1929.
