= Charles-Amédée Kohler =

Swiss chocolate maker and inventor (1790–1874)

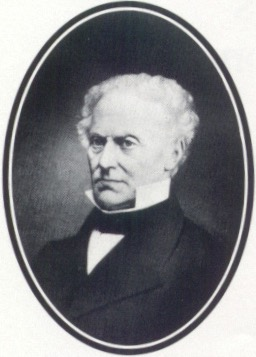
- Born: 15 June 1790; Lausanne, Switzerland
- Died: 15 September 1874 (aged 84); Lausanne, Switzerland
- Occupation: Chocolatier
- Known for: Creator of hazelnut chocolate

Charles-Amédée Kohler (born Charles-Gottlieb Kohler; 15 June 1790 – 15 September 1874) was a Swiss chocolatier and entrepreneur who founded Chocolat Kohler. He notably invented hazelnut chocolate, in his factory that opened in 1830 (Note: 1831 according to the Historical Dictionary of Switzerland) in Lausanne. After his death in 1874, the Kohler company continued in the Swiss chocolate industry. It merged in 1904 with the Peter chocolate brand and in 1911, with the Cailler chocolate brand. The company was purchased by Nestlé in 1929.

== Biography ==
Kohler was born on 15 June 1790 in Lausanne, to Anne Ernst and Gottlieb (later known by the gallicized version of his name, Amédée) Kohler, a merchant of colonial goods and wine from Büren an der Aare. While still young he joined his father's business that had operated in the city since 1793. In 1817 he formed a partnership with his brother, Frédéric, and his father to form the wholesale firm Amédée Kohler et Fils (Amédée Kohler & Sons).

In 1830, Kohler bought a mill in downtown Lausanne and established a chocolate factory, where he eventually created his recipe for chocolate mixed with hazelnuts. After his father's death in 1833, Kohler became fully dedicated to the chocolate making business and Frédéric left the firm the following year.

In 1849, he acquired a sawmill in Sauvabelin, a neighbourhood in the suburbs of Lausanne that he converted into a factory and to where he transferred the production.

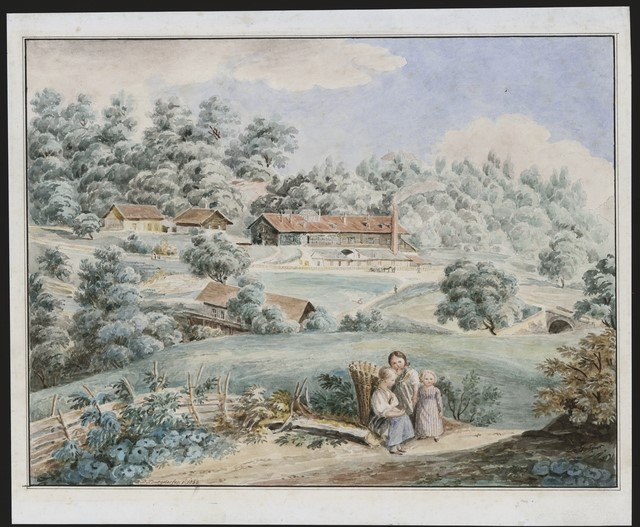
View of Le Flon Valley and Sauvabelin in 1860, with Kohler's second chocolate factory in the background, by Daniel David Burgdorfer

In 1865, Kohler retired from the company and passed the administration to his sons Charles-Amédée and Adolphe. He died in Lausanne on 15 September 1874.
