= Mathieu Cailler =

American poet

- Born: Long Beach, California, U.S.
- Education: Occidental College; Vermont College of Fine Arts (MFA)
- Occupation: Author
- Website: mathieucailler.com

Mathieu Cailler is an American author of poetry and prose.

== Life ==
Mathieu Cailler was born in Long Beach, California, United States, and grew up in Palos Verdes.

He attended Occidental College and Vermont College of Fine Arts, where he received an MFA in creative writing.

His debut collection of short stories, Loss Angeles, contained 15 stories all informed by loss, and was published in 2015.

== Books ==
His works include:

- Clotheslines. Red Bird Chapbooks. 2014.
- Cailler, Mathieu (2014). Bleyker, Ariana Den (ed.). Shhh (4th ed.). ELJ Publications. ISBN 978-1-941617-15-1.
- Loss Angeles. Short Story America Press. 15 March 2015. ISBN 978-0-9882497-4-5.
- Forest for the Trees & Other Stories, Hidden Peak Press. 2023

== Awards ==
According to his website, Cailler was the winner of a Short Story America Prize and a Shakespeare Award. He is the author of the short-story collection, Loss Angeles (Short Story America Press), which has been honored by the Hollywood, New York, London, Paris, Best Book, and International Book Awards; the poetry collection, May I Have This Dance? (About Editions), winner of the 2017 New England Book Festival Poetry Prize; and the children’s book, The (Underappreciated) Life of Humphrey Hawley (About Editions), which has been nominated for the Caldecott Medal and the Newbery Award, among other notable prizes. His most recent books are the poetry collection, Catacombs of the Heart (Spartan Press) and Hi, I’m Night (Olympia), a children’s book. His first novel, Heaven and Other Zip Codes will be published by Open Books in late 2020.
