= Daniel Peter =

Swiss businessman (1836–1919)

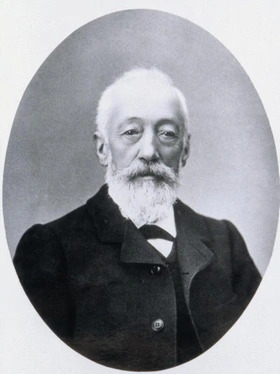
- Born: 9 March 1836; Moudon, Switzerland
- Died: 4 November 1919 (aged 83); Vevey, Switzerland
- Occupation: Chocolatier
- Known for: Creator of milk chocolate and founder of Peter's Chocolate
- Relatives: François-Louis Cailler (father-in-law)

Daniel Peter (9 March 1836 – 4 November 1919) was a Swiss chocolatier and entrepreneur who founded Peter's Chocolate. A neighbour of Henri Nestlé in Vevey, he was one of the first chocolatiers to make milk chocolate and is credited for inventing it, in 1875 or 1876, by adding powdered milk to the chocolate.

== Life ==
Peter was born on 9 March 1836 in Moudon, in the canton of Vaud, to Jean Samuel Peter, a butcher, and Jeanne-Louise Laurent, in a family of Alsatian origin. He began his commercial apprenticeship in Vevey, where in 1856 he established the candle-making business Frères Peter, but soon he diversified his business to include chocolate fabrication, as demand for his candles fell, owing to the introduction of affordable kerosene lamps. He married in 1863 to Fanny-Louise Cailler, a daughter of François-Louis Cailler, also a chocolatier.

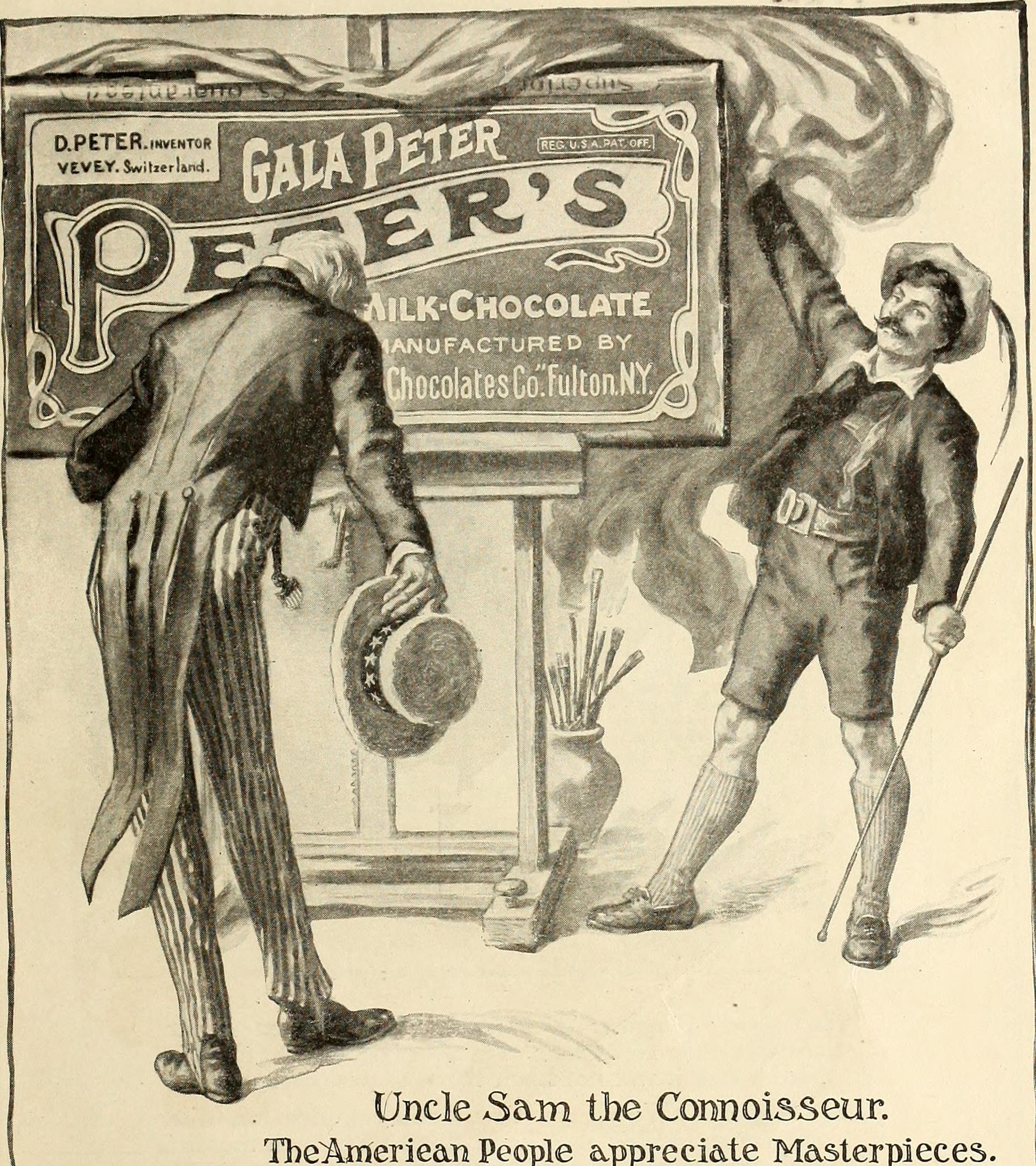
Ad for Gala Peter

When Peter came up with the process of making milk chocolate in 1857, he had a problem with removing the water from the milk, which caused mildew to form. It was not until he enlisted the cooperation of Henri Nestlé, then a baby-food manufacturer who had invented a milk-condensation process, that finally, in 1875, after seven years of effort, he was able to bring the product onto the market. However, it is only after many years of fine-tuning that the original formula was developed and, in 1887, the Gala Peter brand was finally launched. Daniel Peter called his product 'Gala' after the Greek word meaning 'milk'. From these developments, Switzerland soon dominated the chocolate market. Earlier, in 1896, Daniel Peter wrote:

I believe I know with some certainty that almost all manufacturers in Switzerland, if not all, have tried to copy me. It is proof of the value they attribute to my creation, and all of them, after unsuccessful attempts, have had to give it up, and I do not know, at the present time, any competition for my product

Daniel Peter also launched the Delta Peter brand, which consisted of milk and cocoa powder that could be added to water to make a chocolate drink. Peter used a triangular packaging, with each individual triangle of pressed powder to be used for one cup.

Earlier, in 1879, Daniel Peter and Henri Nestlé formed a partnership that organised the Nestlé Company, eventually one of the largest of Europe-based confection industries, into existence. In 1904, he merged with the Kohler company. All Peter, Cailler, and Kohler brands were bought by Nestlé in 1929.

Daniel Peter died on 4 November 1919 in Vevey.
