= List of chocolatiers =

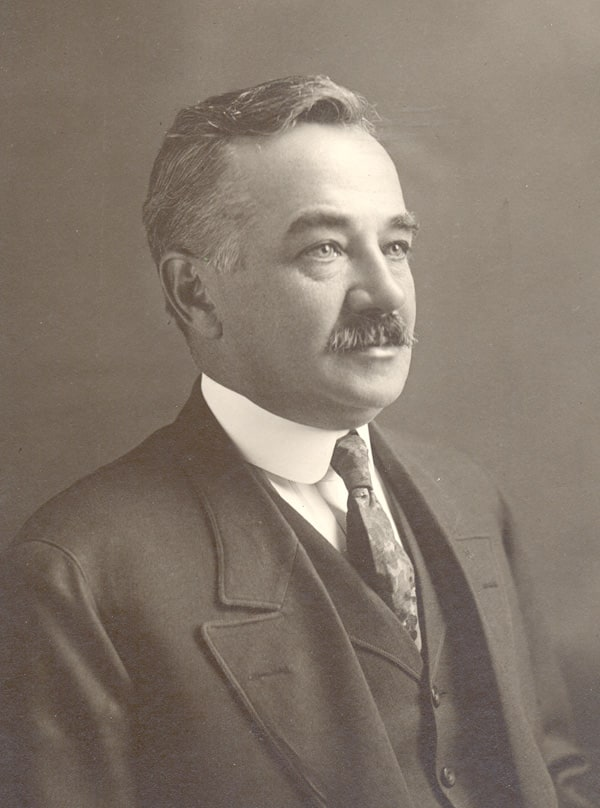
Milton S. Hershey

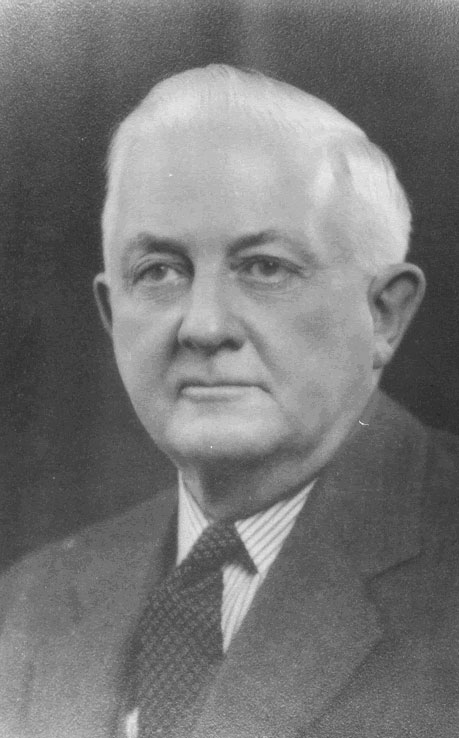
H.B. Reese

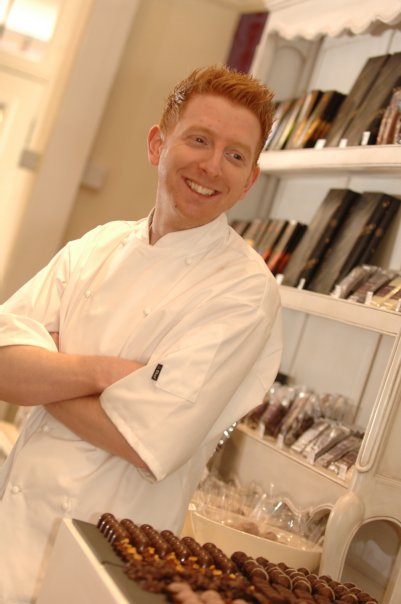
Paul A. Young

This is a list of notable chocolatiers. A chocolatier is a person or business who makes confectionery from chocolate. Chocolatiers are distinct from chocolate makers, who create chocolate from cacao beans and other ingredients.

== Chocolatiers ==
- Michel Allex
- Louis Barnett
- Anthon Berg
- Fran Bigelow
- John Cadbury
- Pascal Caffet
- Thomas Caffrey
- François-Louis Cailler
- María Fernanda Di Giacobbe
- Gilbert Ganong
- Jacques Genin
- Domingo Ghirardelli
- Mott Green
- Milton S. Hershey
- Jean-Paul Hévin
- Coenraad Johannes van Houten
- Hans Imhoff
- Andreas Jacobs
- Klaus Johann Jacobs
- Leonidas Kestekides
- Fritz Knipschildt
- Charles-Amédée Kohler
- Emeril Lagasse
- Rodolphe Lindt
- Norman Love
- Franklin Clarence Mars
- Menier family
- Antoine Brutus Menier
- Émile-Justin Menier
- Daniel Peter
- H.B. Reese
- Harry Specters
- Robert Steinberg
- Philippe Suchard
- Joseph William Thornton
- Paul A. Young

== See also ==
- Candy making
- Chocolaterie
- List of bean-to-bar chocolate manufacturers
