= Emil Baumann =

Swiss chocolatier (1883–1966)

Emil Baumann (1883-1966) was a Swiss chocolatier. He is noted as one of the inventors of Toblerone, which is considered the world’s first patented milk chocolate bar.

== Biography ==
Very little is known about Baumann’s early life prior to his association with the development of Toblerone. A report published in Der Bund in 1962 commemorating his birthday stated that he was involved in the chocolate industry at an early age. When he was 16, he was already working for chocolate factories in Bern. In 1899, Baumann co-founded the Tobler Chocolate Factory with his cousin, Theodor Tobler, in Bern, Switzerland. There are sources that cited he studied confectionery production at Metz. A variation of this account said that he went there under the direction of Tobler to learn confectionery trade secrets.

Baumann is credited with concocting the Toblerone chocolate bar. During a trip to France, he came across the Montélimar nougat, a confectionery made from honey, almond, and sugar. He then integrated it into a chocolate product, which became the company’s flagship chocolate, Toblerone. Tobler is said to have worked on the packaging and the product’s triangular shape was inspired by the Matterhorn, Switzerland’s famous mountain peak.

Baumann and Tobler registered the Toblerone product for a patent at Bern’s Federal Institute for Intellectual Property in 1909, when a young Albert Einstein was working there as a patent clerk. After two years, they were granted a patent for Toblerone, making it the world’s first patented milk chocolate bar.

Baumann later immigrated to the United States and lived in Nevada. He died on February 4, 1966.

== Controversy ==
In 2019, descendants of both Baumann and Tobler disagreed as to who invented Toblerone. The Baumann family, for instance, took issue with the publishing of a book titled The Chocolate Baron, which was co-authored by Andreas Tobler, that claimed Baumann only followed Tobler’s instructions. The Baumanns argued that while Tobler developed the shape and the packaging, it was Baumann who developed the recipe.
