= Chumicheva =

Chumicheva or Tchoumitcheva (Russian: Чумичева) is a surname. Notable people with this surname include:

- Valentina Chumicheva (1931–2021), a Soviet diver
- Xenia Tchoumitcheva (born 1987), a Russian-Swiss model, actress, and writer
