= Pascal Caffet =

French pastry confectioner and chocolate maker

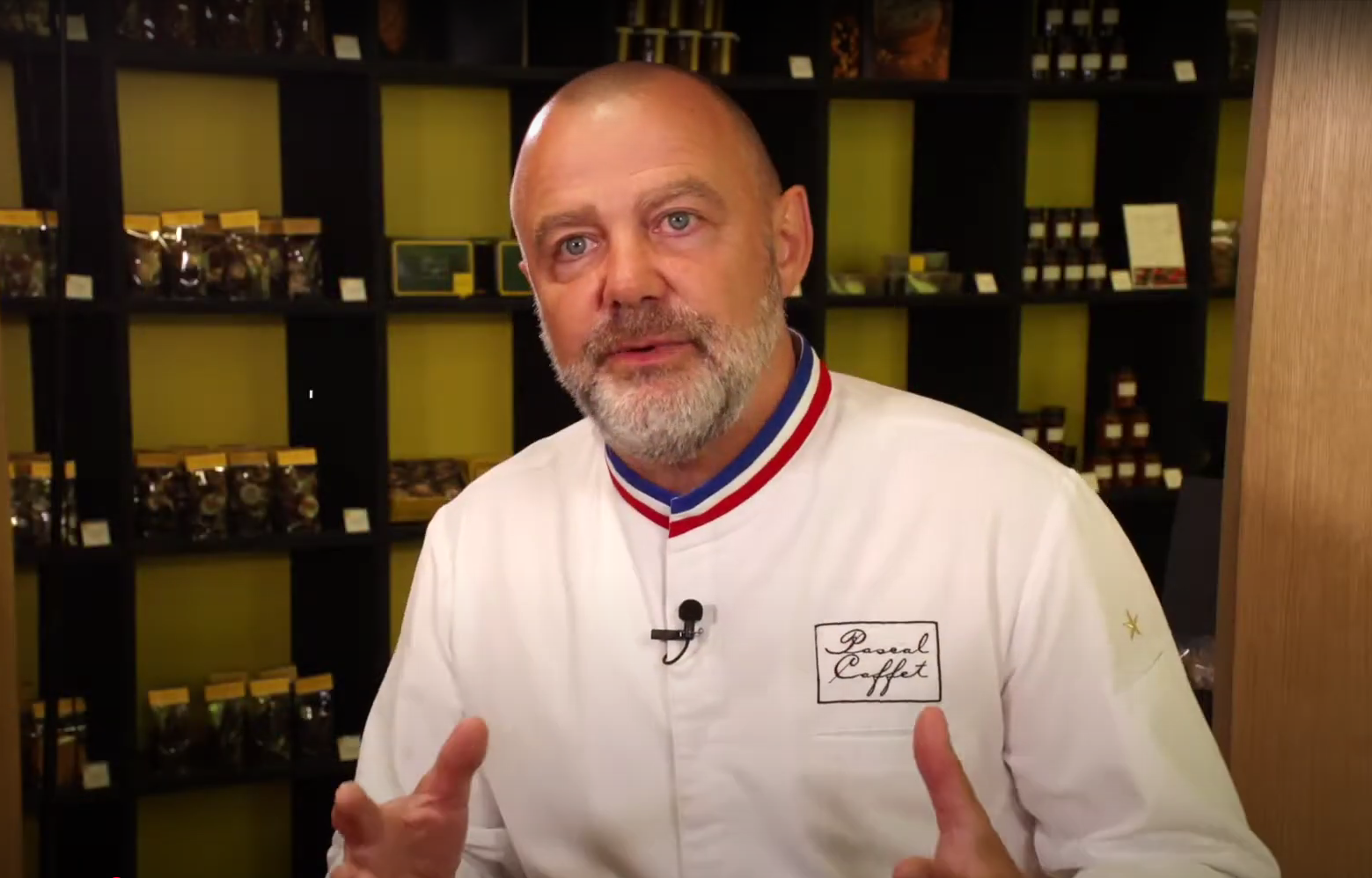
- Caffet in 2019
- Born: 1962 (age 62–63); Troyes, France
- Website: maison-caffet.com

Pascal Caffet (born 1962) is a French pastry confectioner and chocolate maker. He specializes in chocolate pralines and has shops in France, Italy, and Japan. He won the Meilleur Ouvrier de France competition.

== Early life ==
Caffet was born in 1962 and raised in Troyes, France, to Lydie and Bernard Caffet, who opened a chocolate shop, Le Palais de Chocolate, in 1979. He trained with Maison Peltier and with Gaston Lenôtre.

== Chocolatier ==
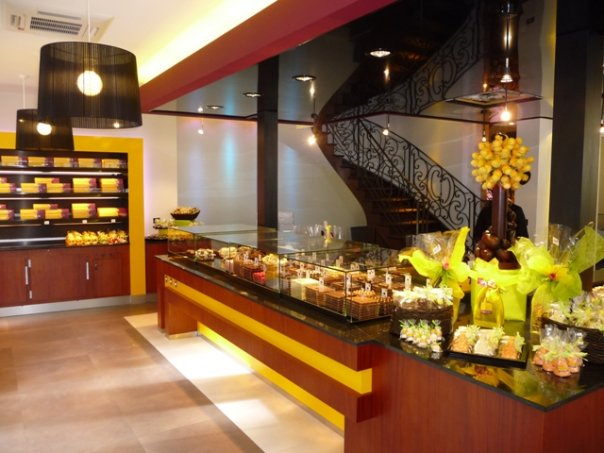
Boutique Pascal Caffet, Troyes, France

After his father's death in 1987, he and his wife, Florence, ran the shop.

In 1997 he launched a competition for early-career chocolatiers.

In 2004 the company opened another shop in Troyes and several shops in Japan. It opened its first shop in Paris in 2008. In 2010 it opened a shop in Turin, Italy. In 2013 it opened one in Nevers and one in Reims.

Caffet specializes in chocolate pralines. In 2017 he published Praline ISBN 9782732477008.

In October of 2018 a fire destroyed his workshop in Pont-Sainte-Marie.

== Awards ==
- Best French Pastry Confectioner (1989, Meilleur Ouvrier de France)
- Gold Medal Pastry & Chocolate World-Championship (1996, Champion du Monde). Milan, Italy
- Gold Medal Pastry & Chocolate World-Championship (2003, Champion du Monde). Lyon, France
- The Club des Croqueurs de Chocolat (2008)
- Best chocolate maker in France (2009)
- Living Heritage Company (2014)

== Personal life ==
Caffet was married to Florence. By 2020 he was married to Gaëlle.

== See also ==
- List of chocolatiers
