= Andreas Jacobs =

German businessman

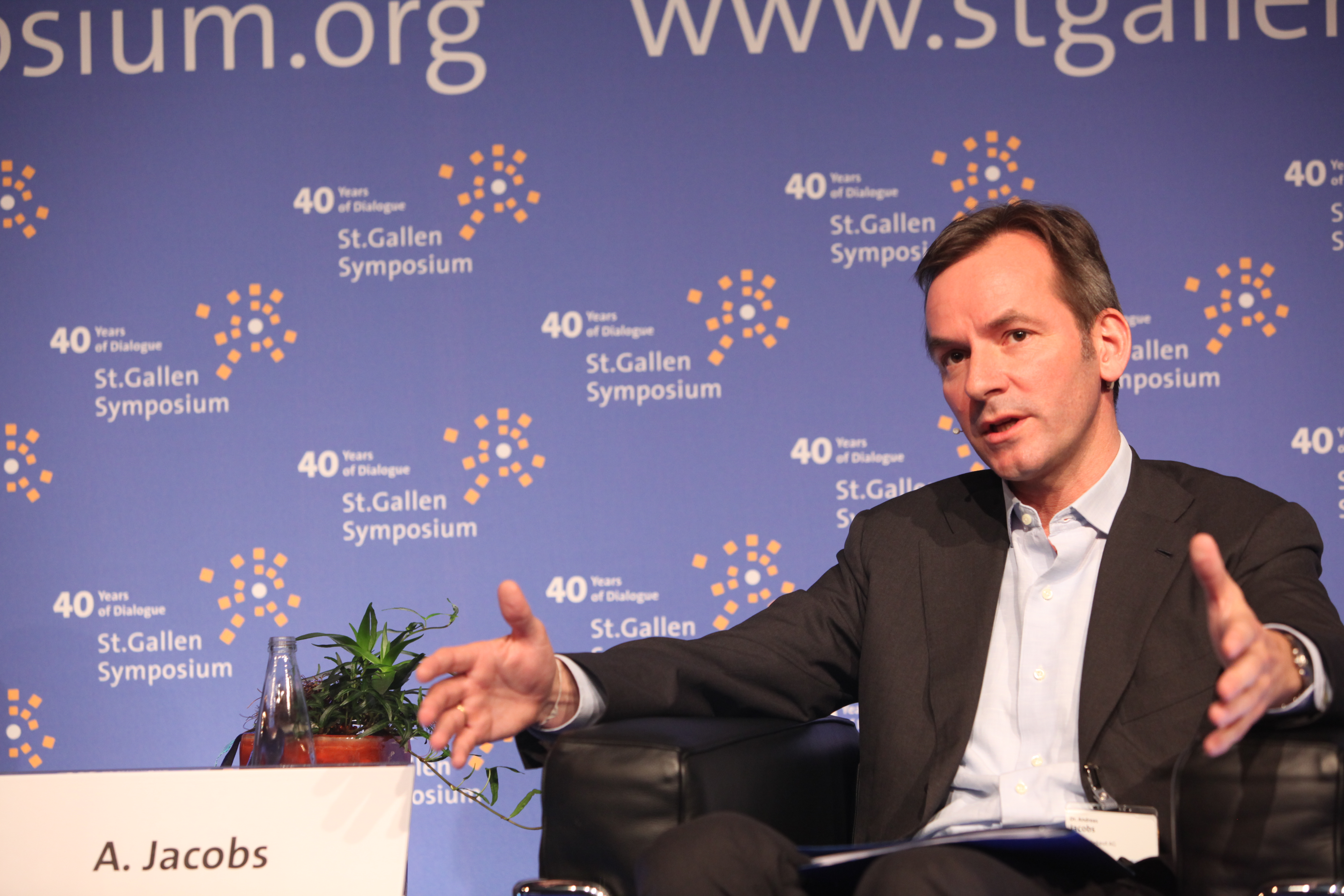
- Born: Walther Andreas Jacobs; 27 October 1963 (age 62); Bremen, West Germany
- Education: University of Freiburg; LMU Munich; University of Montpellier; University of Freiburg (Dr. iur.); INSEAD (MBA)
- Occupations: Businessman, investor and board member
- Known for: Leader and controlling owner of Jacobs
- Spouse: Natalie Jacobs
- Children: 4

Walther Andreas Jacobs (born 27 October 1963) is a German businessman, private equity investor and heir to Jacobs. His father was Klaus J. Jacobs, who was an equestrian and controlling shareholder of the company. He is chairman and a board member for business school INSEAD and several companies, which include Dr. Oetker and Louis Dreyfus Company.

== Early life and education ==
Jacobs was born in October 1963 in Bremen, West Germany to Klaus J. Jacobs. He and his elder brother Christian (born 1962) were the oldest sons of Klaus J. Jacobs through his first marriage. His father was the main heir and controlling shareholder of Jacobs, which was founded in 1895 by Johann Jacobs. Their parents divorced in 1973 and their father remarried to Zürich-born now-philanthropist Renata Jacobs, which resulted in four half-siblings: Lavinia (born 1980), Nicolas (born 1982), Philippe (born 1984) and Nathalie (born 1985).

He studied law at the University of Freiburg, LMU Munich and the University of Montpellier. Subsequently, Jacobs obtained a Doctor of Law from the University of Freiburg. Afterwards, he obtained an MBA from INSEAD in Fontainebleau, France.

== Career ==
From 1991, Jacobs worked three years as a consultant and project manager at The Boston Consulting Group in Munich. Since 1992, Jacobs has been an independent entrepreneur with a stake in several companies plus minority interests in several other companies.

Since 2000, Jacobs has been responsible for the family business in Switzerland. As from 2003, he was on the board of Barry Callebaut AG, where he was chairman from 2005 to 2016. He was executive chairman of Jacobs Holding AG, an active private equity investor, from 2004 to 2015 and a member of the board until 2019. In April 2015, he stepped down from his functions at Adecco SA, where he had been a member of the board since May 2006, chairman of the nomination & compensation committee since May 2008 and as vice-chairman of the board since January 2012. Furthermore, he was chairman of Infront Sports & Media AG (until 2011), and chairman of Brach's Inc. (from 2000 until 2004).

Jacobs is chairman of INSEAD, Minibar AG and Röwer & Rüb GmbH. Furthermore, he is CEO of Niantic Holding GmbH, a member of the advisory board of August Oetker KG, member of the board of Louis Dreyfus Company Holdings, member of the board of Hoist Group Holding Intressenter AB, and member of the board of directors of various small private companies. In 2015, he was co-founder and investor of GENUI Partners, an investment company based in Germany, where he advises several investments. In 2020, Andreas joined the board of directors of Hoist Group – provider of the widest range of hospitality technology.

The Jacobs family, one of the wealthiest German families, reached an estimated net worth of CHF 8.5 billion ($ 8.8 billion) in 2016 (largely incorporated in the endowded Jacobs Foundation, the 1st wealthiest Swiss charitable organization and 27th wealthiest charitable foundation in the world in 2020), and over EUR 4 billion ($4.7 billion) in 2021, via its family's investment company, the Jacobs Holding.
