= Golnar and Haleh Abivardi =

Swiss sisters and entrepreneurs

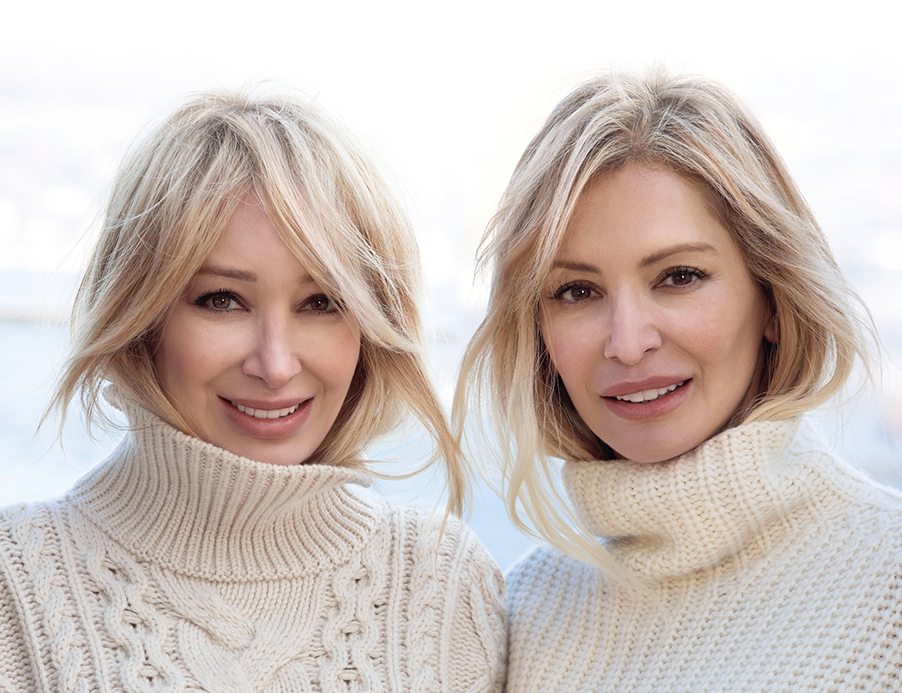
- Golnar Abivardi (left) and Haleh Abivardi (right)
- Born: March 1973 (age 53)
- Education: University of Zurich
- Occupations: Entrepreneur, dentist
- Known for: Co-founder of Swiss Smile and vVardis

Golnar Abivardi and Haleh Abivardi, also known as the Abivardi Sisters or as Goly/Goli and Haley, are Swiss dentists and businesspeople, known for the Swiss Smile chain of dental clinics and the dental care company vVARDIS.

== Early life and education ==
Their father was a natural scientist at ETH Zurich and their mother was the director of a school for the English language. Moving within the country, they started working different side jobs as teenagers, receiving their Matura in Zürich. Both studied dentistry at the University of Zurich.

== Career ==
After working as employed dentists, Haleh Abivardi, the older sibling, took over a dental practice in Amriswil in 2001, opening the Abivardi & Abivardi practice with her younger sister. In 2002, they founded Swiss Smile with its first clinic at the ShopVille shopping mall at Zürich Central Station. The business idea is inspired by the mall itself, featuring f. e. long opening hours.

In 2017 the Swiss Jacobs Holding bought a share from the Abivardi sisters and from Swedish EQT AB that had acquired a minority interest in 2013. They exited their shareholdings in Swiss Smile and the parent company Colosseum Dental in 2020.

In August 2019, the two sisters founded vVardis AG with a registered office in Zug, Switzerland, an oral care company that includes Credentis AG (acquired in 2020) and its portfolio of oral care technologies.

== Recognition and philanthropy ==
Besides being engaged in charity organisations offering free dental care for people in need, both Abivardi sisters received the Veuve Clicquot Businesswoman of the Year award for Switzerland in 2007.
