= The Yachay Initiative =

Germany-based nonprofit organization

Yachay Initiative
- Founded: 2010
- Founder: Taylor Hartrick; Caroline Laroche; Franziska Landes
- Type: Nonprofit organization
- Origins: Bremen, Germany
- Region served: Germany, Ecuador, Scotland
- Website: yachayinitiative.org

The Yachay Initiative is a registered nonprofit organization that focuses on fostering youth education and empowerment as a vehicle for community development and poverty alleviation. Founded in 2010 and named after the Quichua (Ecuadorian) verb "to learn", the Yachay Initiative (YI) has projects in Ecuador, Germany, and Scotland. The Yachay Initiative is registered in Canada and has received support from the Jacobs Foundation, the Heinz-Peter und Annelotte Koch Stiftung, and Jacobs University Bremen.

== Ecuador ==
In Ecuador, YI works with community schools to offer educational leadership programs, while also working with local families to develop organic vegetable gardens as a sustainable source of nutrients. A pilot project was completed in Ecuador in 2010 to test these programs, followed by an investigative project titled "Phase II", that aimed to co-develop enhanced versions of both programs together with the local communities. Phase "II" is now complete and ongoing projects are scheduled to start in Ecuador in 2012. The ongoing project to start in 2012 has stated the following aims: to run 10 Yachay Youth Leadership programs with 250 students in 6 communities, to support 70 families to build and sustain their first family vegetable gardens, to run a school lunch program for students participating in the Leadership program, and to launch a new Yachay Youth Internship program, both locally and internationally.

== Germany ==
In Germany, YI runs leadership programs with children in underprivileged elementary schools in Bremen. A pilot project was conducted from February 2010 to May 2010 at the Oberschule an der Lerchenstrasse in Bremen, Germany. Yachay Germany is currently launching a new and revised full length youth leadership project in partnership with a fifth grade class at the Gerhard-Rohlfs Oberschule in Vegesack.

== Outreach program ==
In Canada and Scotland, YI has been developing a workshop series to educate young people about development issues and the process of starting their own projects. A first round of presentations is expected to be held in high schools in Canada, Scotland, Germany, Norway, and Ethiopia by the end of 2011/early 2012.
