= JaCiva's Bakery and Chocolatier =

Defunct bakery and chocolate shop in Portland, Oregon, U.S.

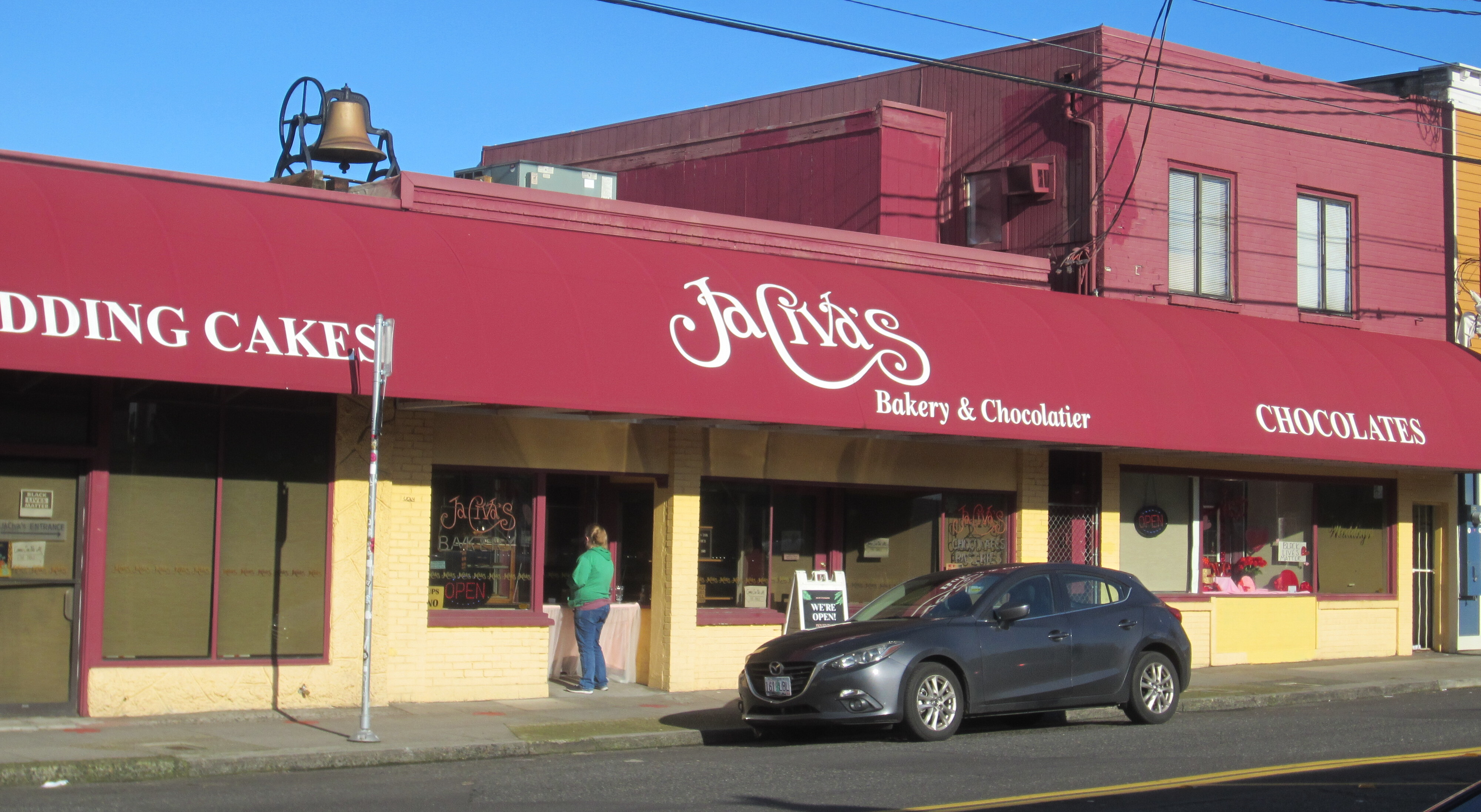
- The shop's exterior, 2021
- Interactive map of JaCiva's Bakery and Chocolatier

Restaurant information
- Established: December 1986
- Location: 4733 Southeast Hawthorne Boulevard, Portland, Oregon, 97215, United States
- Coordinates: 45.5121°N 122.6134°W
- Website: jacivas.com

JaCiva's Bakery and Chocolatier was a bakery and chocolate shop in Portland, Oregon, United States. The business closed permanently in 2024.

== Description ==
JaCiva's was a bakery and chocolate shop on Hawthorne Boulevard in southeast Portland's Sunnyside neighborhood. The shop had a small private event space and a dessert house called After Dark, which specialized in chocolates, cakes, and tortes. JaCiva's offered pastries, cheesecake, coffee cake, truffles, and other "interestingly shaped" chocolates.

== History ==
Jack and Iva Elmer co-founded the bakery in December 1986. The couple's daughters operated the business after Jack suffered a stroke in 1990. Iva helped coordinate the temporary installation of American flags along Hawthorne Boulevard at certain times of the year.

Jack died in 2014 at the age of 75. One of his surviving daughters wrote, "He was loved and will be missed greatly."

During the COVID-19 pandemic, the business had a take-out window and drive-through operation. Face masks were required even after Oregon's mandate ended, as of March 2022. The business announced plans to close in 2023, citing the pandemic as well as crime and vandalism as reasons. JaCiva's closed on July 29, 2024.

== Reception ==
JaCiva's was a runner-up in the Best Sweet Shop/Chocolatier category of Willamette Week's annual 'Best of Portland' readers' poll in 2024. Michael Russell included JaCiva's in The Oregonian's list of the 21 "most painful" restaurant and bar closures of 2024.

== See also ==
- Impact of the COVID-19 pandemic on the food industry
- Impact of the COVID-19 pandemic on the restaurant industry in the United States
- List of bakeries
- List of chocolatiers
