= Barry Callebaut =

Swiss-Belgian cocoa producer

Barry Callebaut AG
- Type: Aktiengesellschaft
- Traded as: SIX: BARN
- ISIN: CH0009002962
- Founded: Merger of Cacao Barry and Callebaut in 1996; 30 years ago
- Headquarters: Zürich, Switzerland
- Area served: Worldwide
- Key people: Patrick De Maeseneire, Chairman; Hein Schumacher, CEO
- Products: Chocolate
- Revenue: 12,189,600,000 Swiss franc (2025/2026)
- Operating income: 594,000,000 Swiss franc (2025/2026)
- Net income: 215,500,000 Swiss franc (2025/2026)
- Number of employees: 13.267 (2025/2026)
- Website: Barry-Callebaut.com

Barry Callebaut AG is a Swiss-Belgian cocoa processor and chocolate manufacturer. It was created in 1996 through the merging of the French company Cacao Barry and the Belgian chocolate producer Callebaut, and it is based in Zürich, Switzerland. The company was created in its present form by Klaus Johann Jacobs. In 2019, it had 61 production sites, located in Europe, Africa, the Americas, and Asia.

Barry Callebaut's customers include multinational and national branded consumer goods manufacturers and artisanal users of chocolate (chocolatiers, pastry chefs, bakeries, and caterers).

== History ==
=== Cacao Barry ===
Cacao Barry was founded in Hardricourt, France, by Charles Barry, an Englishman with an interest for exploring Africa in 1842. During Barry's travels to Africa, he came in contact with cocoa beans, a major component in the production of chocolate, which the company began producing in 1911.

In 1952, Cacao Barry began to produce gourmet chocolate. In 1992, the holding company Société Centrale d'Investissement (SCI) gained control of Cacao Barry and transferred 49% of its capital to Compagnie Nationale à Portefeuille (CNP), an investment fund in financier Albert Frère's group. SCI's management approach favoured greater penetration of the British market, with the consequent opening of a production site in the United Kingdom.

=== Callebaut ===
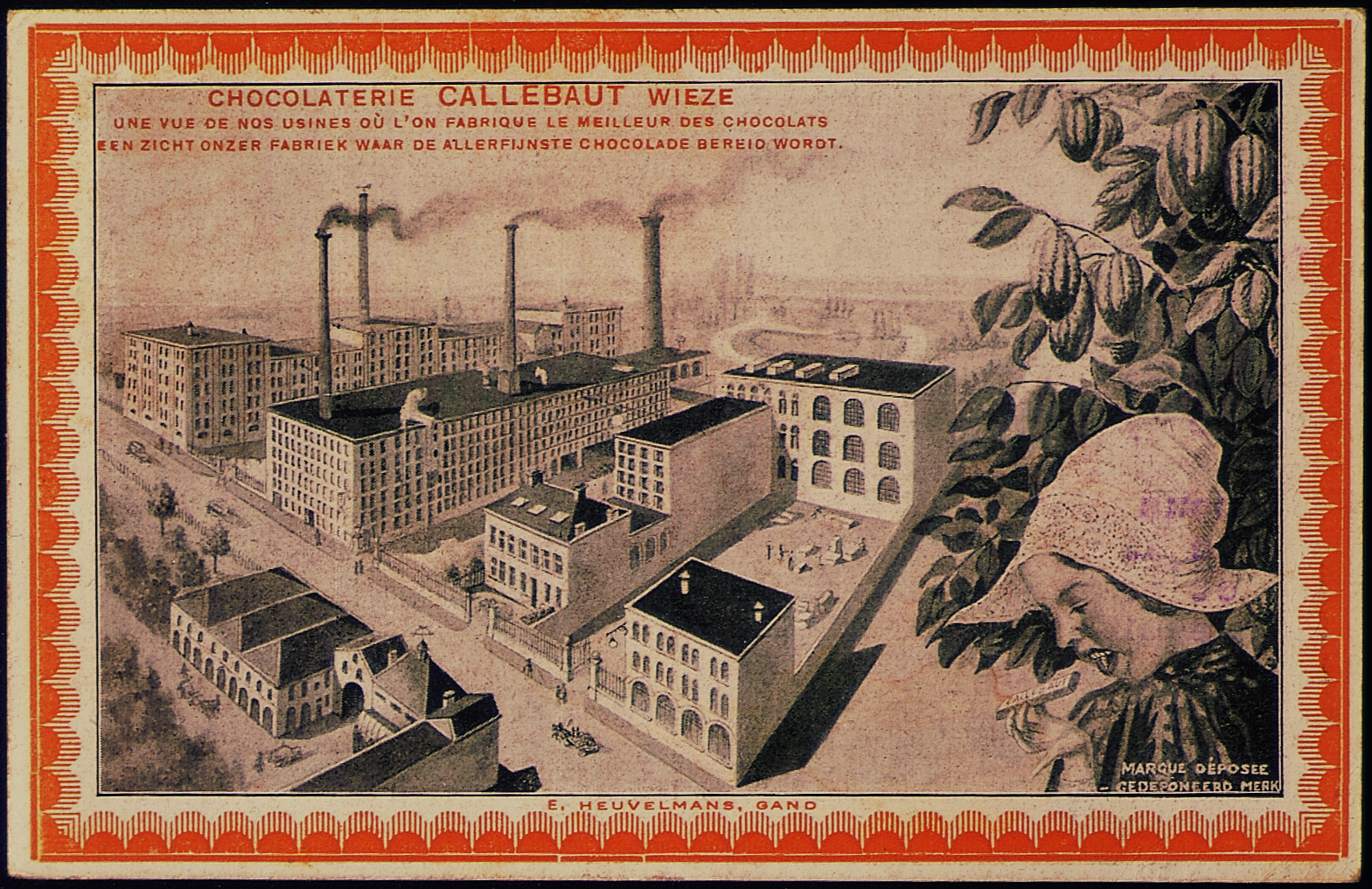
Postcard depicting the original Callebaut factory

Callebaut

Callebaut was a Belgian company, founded by Eugenius Callebaut as a brewery in Wieze in 1850. The brewery began producing chocolate bars in 1911 under Octaaf Callebaut, using the same factory, and soon switched entirely to chocolate production. It began making couverture chocolate in 1925. Following Octaaf Callebaut's death, his daughter Marie and his nephew Charles took over the company in 1945. After World War II, the production of coverture chocolate became the company's core business, complemented by a limited range of bars.

In the 1950s, Callebaut, which was still a family-run business, began exporting its products to other European as well as North American markets, leveraging the fact that Belgian chocolate had earned an excellent reputation for its quality. By 1965, Callebaut coverture chocolate was being sold across Europe and in other parts of the world. In 1981, Interfood, a subsidiary of Tobler-Suchard, bought the company. In 1983, Klaus Jacobs acquired full control of Interfood and became an international confectionery leader. After a series of acquisitions in the industry, the company merged with the US company Kraft in 1987, creating Kraft Jacobs Suchard.

=== Chocolaterie Bernard Callebaut ===
Bernard Callebaut, heir of the founding family, moved to Calgary, Canada, in 1982, where he opened a chocolate factory named Chocolaterie Bernard Callebaut.

=== Merger and acquisitions ===
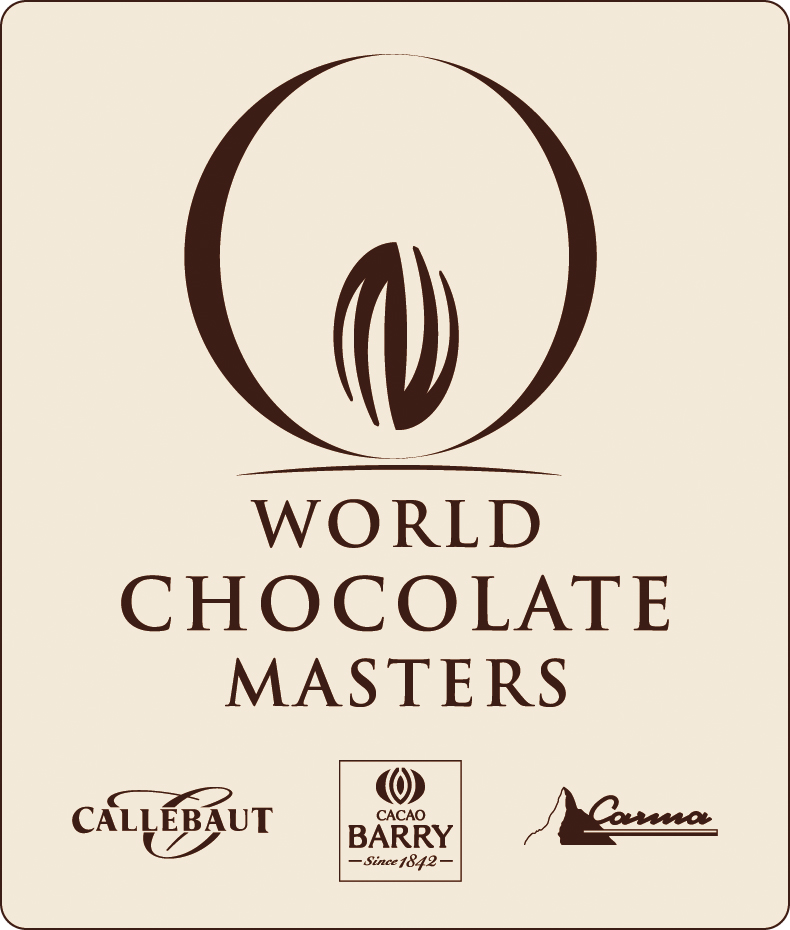
World Chocolate Masters

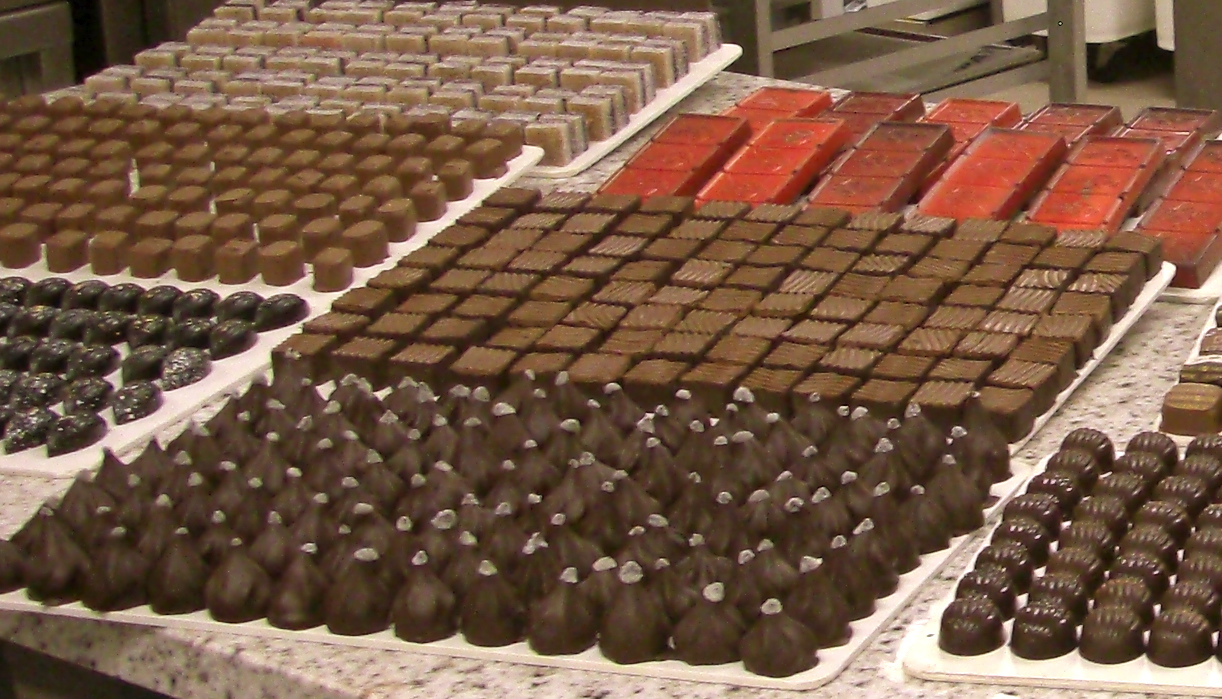
Chocolates made by Barry Callebaut

Cacao Barry and Callebaut merged in 1996 to form Barry Callebaut. In 1998, the company was listed on the SIX Swiss Exchange. From a business standpoint, the new Franco-Belgian confectionery company continued to grow, with Jacobs Suchard assigning it the management of Van Houten, the Dutch chocolate and cocoa powder maker founded in 1815 in Amsterdam, which Suchard had acquired in 1986.

In 1999, the company acquired the US-based confectionery Van Leer Chocolate and, the following year, it purchased the Swiss Carma-Pfister AG. In 2002, it acquired the German company Stollwerck for $225 million, thereby taking over the 17 brands under its control, including Sarotti. In the same year, Callebaut, together with Cacao Barry and Carma, organized the World Chocolate Masters, a biennial international chocolate competition.

In 2005, Barry Callebaut was noted as being "the world's biggest chocolatier".

In 2007, Barry Callebaut signed an agreement with fellow Swiss brand Nestlé to supply it with 43,000 tonnes of chocolate products per year. Before the year was out, it had acquired KL Kepong Cocoa Products Sdn Bhd in Port Klang, Malaysia. In 2009, Barry Callebaut bought the Spanish chocolate producer Chocovic S.A. These international acquisitions took place in the space of a few years, leading CEO Patrick G. De Maeseneire to announce, "We don't want to be a European company only, we want to be a global company". Two years later, the company transferred its Stollwerck division to the Belgian Baronie Group, disposing of most of its retail operations in European markets.

In 2012, Callebaut launched the Growing Great Chocolate program to help make cocoa cultivation a sustainable source of income for West African farmers and to make a positive impact on their living conditions.

In 2017, Barry Callebaut acquired D'Orsogna Dolciaria, an Italian company specializing in the production of amaretto biscuits, confectionery decorations, and similar products.

Barry Callebaut operates the largest chocolate factory in the world, located in the Belgian town of Wieze. Around 350,000 tons of chocolate are produced there every year.

== Products ==
=== ACTICOA ===
In 2005, Barry Callebaut introduced a "healthy" chocolate product called ACTICOA, which contains higher levels of polyphenol antioxidants (cocoa flavanols) than any other chocolate; some evidence indicates these flavanols have particular health benefits.

=== Ruby chocolate ===
In 2017, Barry Callebaut launched a new type of chocolate, ruby, named after its reddish-pink colour, which is due to the colour of the cocoa beans from which it is made.

In 2018, Nestlé Japan Ltd. launched the ruby chocolate-based Ruby Sublime KitKat, becoming the first global brand to use the pink chocolate formula. The product was also launched the same year in the UK.

=== "Second generation of chocolate" ===
In 2022, Barry Callebaut announced the "second generation of chocolate", which, according to the company, has 50 percent less sugar than most other chocolates. In addition, the dark chocolate consists of only two ingredients and the milk chocolate of only three.

== Governance and ownership structure ==
From 2015 to 2021, Antoine Bernard de Saint-Affrique was CEO of the company, after which Peter Boone took over the position, holding it until 2023, when it went to Peter Feld.

As of May 2024, the company was 30.1% owned by the Zurich-based Jacobs Holding, 5% by Renata Jacobs, 3.1% by BlackRock, and 6.5% by UBS.

== Criticism ==
=== Deforestation ===
In September 2017, the NGO Mighty Earth released a report documenting findings that Barry Callebaut purchases cocoa grown illegally in national parks and other protected forests in the Ivory Coast. The report accused the company of endangering the forest habitats of chimpanzees, elephants, and other wildlife populations by purchasing cocoa linked to deforestation. Seven of the 23 Ivorian protected areas have been almost entirely converted to cocoa plantations.

A follow-up report by Mighty Earth from December 2018 indicated little to no progress had been made in the year since Barry Callebaut and other signatories had committed to the Cocoa and Forests Initiative.

=== Child labour and slavery ===
The chocolate industry, including Barry Callebaut, signed the Harkin-Engel Protocol in September 2001, which included measures intended to end the worst forms of child labour and slavery in the cocoa industry by 2008. An evaluation by Tulane University in 2011 found that not a single one of the six measures mentioned in the Harkin-Engel Protocol had been fully implemented.

In 2021, Barry Callebaut was named in a class action lawsuit filed by eight former child slaves from Mali, who alleged that the company aided and abetted their enslavement on cocoa plantations in Ivory Coast. The suit accused Barry Callebaut (along with Nestlé, Cargill, Mars Inc., Olam International, the Hershey Company, and Mondelez International) of knowingly engaging in forced labor, and the plaintiffs sought damages for unjust enrichment, negligent supervision, and intentional infliction of emotional distress.

In 2022, the "Chocolate Scorecard", a comparative overview of production conditions led by Australian universities, attested that the company was "beginning to establish good policies" regarding child labor. In the overall assessment of the environmental and social criteria, however, Barry Callebaut was only ranked 24th out of 35 companies. The authors viewed the company's performance in areas such as transparency, livelihoods, agroforestry, and, in particular, agrochemical management as particularly critical. In 2023, Barry Callebaut revised its goal of eliminating child labour from its supply chain by 2025 to having the "supply chain [...] be covered by human rights due diligence to eliminate all identifiable cases of child labour".

=== Salmonella ===
In June 2022, Salmonella contamination was detected in a batch of chocolates at the Wieze, Belgium plant, halting production. A shipment of soy lecithin was identified as the source, and the contamination was traced back to a single tanker delivery. Production resumed gradually in August, going back to full capacity by October, after the factory facilities were cleaned.

=== Trading in Russia ===
In January 2024, Barry Callebaut was added to the list of International Sponsors of War for continuing to operate three factories in Russia and having their products used in dry rations of the Russian army.

== See also ==
- List of bean-to-bar chocolate manufacturers
- Swiss chocolate
