= Creo Chocolate =

Chocolate company based in Portland, Oregon

- Logo
- Headquarters: Portland, Oregon, United States

Creo Chocolate is a chocolate company based in Portland, Oregon, United States.

== Description ==
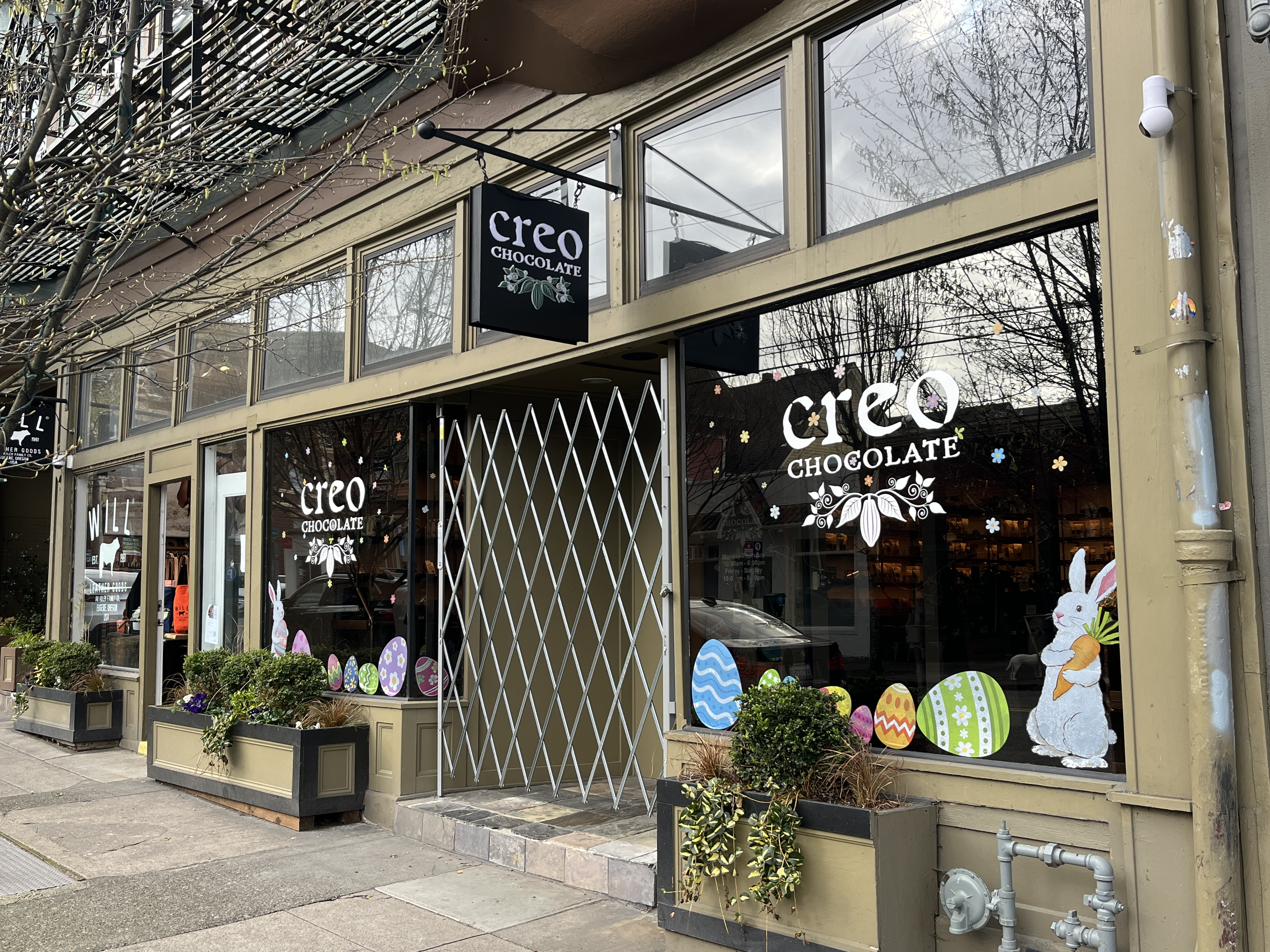
Exterior of a shop in Northwest Portland, Oregon, 2026

The chocolate company Creo Chocolate is based in Portland, Oregon. The business operates chocolate shops, offering various food and drink options such as brownies, chocolate soda, and hot chocolate. In addition to chocolate bars, Creo has also sold hot chocolate mix, chocolate-covered gummy bears, honey peanut butter truffles, and wild pecan caramels.

== History ==
The Straub family (including Tim, Janet, and Kevin) opened Creo Chocolate in 2014.

Creo has sourced Arriba Nacional cacao from Ecuador. The business also offers factory tours and classes.

Creo experienced a break-in in early 2025. In August 2025, the business announced plans to open new chocolate lab and tasting space in northeast Portland.

== Reception ==
Bennett Campbell Ferguson included the business in Willamette Week's 2016 overview of Portland's seven best hot chocolates. Samantha Bakall of The Oregonian included Creo in a similar list in 2017. In 2021, David Landsel included Creo in Food & Wine's list of the fifty best chocolate makers and chocolate shops in the United States. Rebecca Roland and Seiji Nanbu included Creo in Eater Portland's 2024 overview of the city's best hot chocolate.

== See also ==
- List of bean-to-bar chocolate manufacturers
- List of chocolate bar brands
- List of chocolatiers
