= Jacobs Holding =

Swiss investment firm

- Company type: Aktiengesellschaft AG
- Industry: Investments
- Founded: 1994; 31 years ago
- Founder: Klaus Johann Jacobs
- Headquarters: Zurich, Switzerland
- Area served: Switzerland
- Key people: Timothy Franks (CEO), Nicolas Jacobs, Philippe Jacobs
- Products: Private equity
- Owner: Jacobs Foundation
- Website: jacobsholding.com

Jacobs Holding is a Swiss investment firm based in Zürich founded in 1994 by Klaus Johann Jacobs which developed from Jacobs Suchard AG. The investment firm's sole economic beneficiary is the Jacobs Foundation.

Following the sale of 10.1% of Adecco in 2014, the focus is on the 50.1% stake in Barry Callebaut AG. In addition, the holding company has two companies in the UK and Argentina specializing in agribusiness.

== History ==
The company was founded 1994 by Klaus Johann Jacobs.

In 2001 Klaus Jacobs surrendered his entire share of the business to the Jacobs Foundation, with an effective value of CHF 1.5 billion. The foundation became the sole economic beneficiary of the business.

Andreas Jacobs was Executive Chairman from 2004 to 2015 and remained a Member of the Board afterwards. The co-presidents of the board are Nicolas and Philippe Jacobs, the other three members are Patrick Firmenich, Conrad Meyer and Renata Jacobs. Patrick De Maeseneire is the Chief Executive.

It owned Newsells Park until it was sold in 2021 to tech entrepreneur Graham Smith-Bernal.

In May 2018 it was reportedly planning to buy Portman Dentalcare.

The firm acquired and became the majority owner of Cognita Schools in September 2018.
