= Theodor Tobler =

Swiss chocolatier and founder of Toblerone (1876–1941)

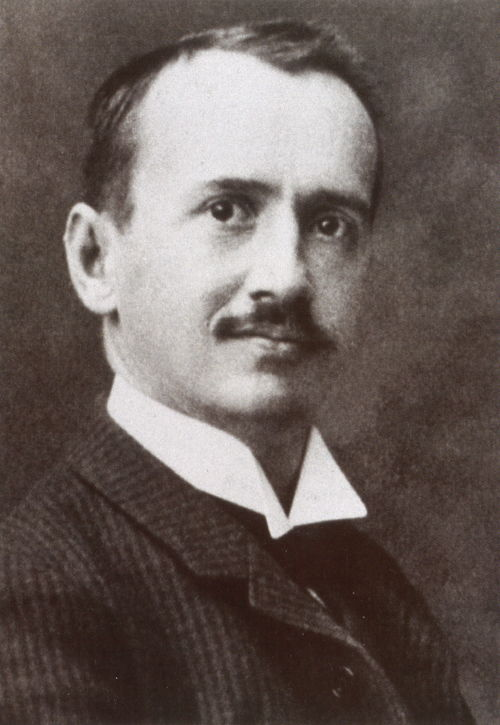
- Born: 24 January 1876; Bern, Switzerland
- Died: 4 May 1941 (aged 65); Bern, Switzerland
- Occupations: Chocolatier, businessman
- Known for: Co-creator of Toblerone

Theodor Tobler (24 January 1876 – 4 May 1941) was a Swiss chocolatier and businessman, best known as the creator, along with Emil Baumann, of the Swiss chocolate brand Toblerone.

== Early life ==
Tobler was born on 24 January 1876 in Bern to Johann Jakob Tobler (1830–1905), a confectioner from Lutzenberg, a town in Appenzell Ausserrhoden near the Austrian border, and Adeline Lorenz Tobler (née Baumann). He attended school in Bern from 1885 to 1892, but left without graduating. After receiving a commercial education in Geneva and Venice, Tobler entered his father's business in 1894.

As their demand increased in the following years, in 1899 Johann Jakob Tobler transformed the confectionery shop into a chocolate factory, naming it Fabrique de Chocolat Berne, Tobler & Cie. In 1900, the company was handed over to Tobler by his father.

== Career ==
In 1908, Tobler and his cousin Emil Baumann, the company's production manager, created the Toblerone chocolate bar, naming the product as a portmanteau combining Tobler's surname and torrone, the Italian word for honey and almond nougat. Tobler applied for a patent for the Toblerone manufacturing process in Bern in 1909. The brand was trademarked the same year at the Swiss Federal Institute of Intellectual Property, becoming the first patented milk chocolate made with almonds and honey.

Tobler left the company in 1933 and bought the Klameth confectionery firm in Bern in 1934. After attempts to manufacture chewing gum at Klameth were unsuccessful, the company acquired the distribution rights in Switzerland for the Wrigley chewing gum. In 1937, he founded the enterprise Typon AG, in Burgdorf, which produced films for the graphic industry.

He was a witness at the Bern Trial on behalf of the freemasonry. Tobler died in Bern on 4 May 1941.

== Personal life ==
Tobler was first married to Theda Born, from 1903 until their divorce in 1919, then to Bertha Eschmann after 1919. He was a member of the masonic lodge zur Hoffnung of Bern from 1902.

A pacifist and pan-european, Tobler was one of the founders in 1934, in Basel, of the Europa Union, an organization supportive of European federalism, predecessor of the present-day European Movement Switzerland, which advocates Switzerland's full entry into the European Union.

== See also ==
- List of chocolatiers
