= Claude Lebey =

French food critic and publisher

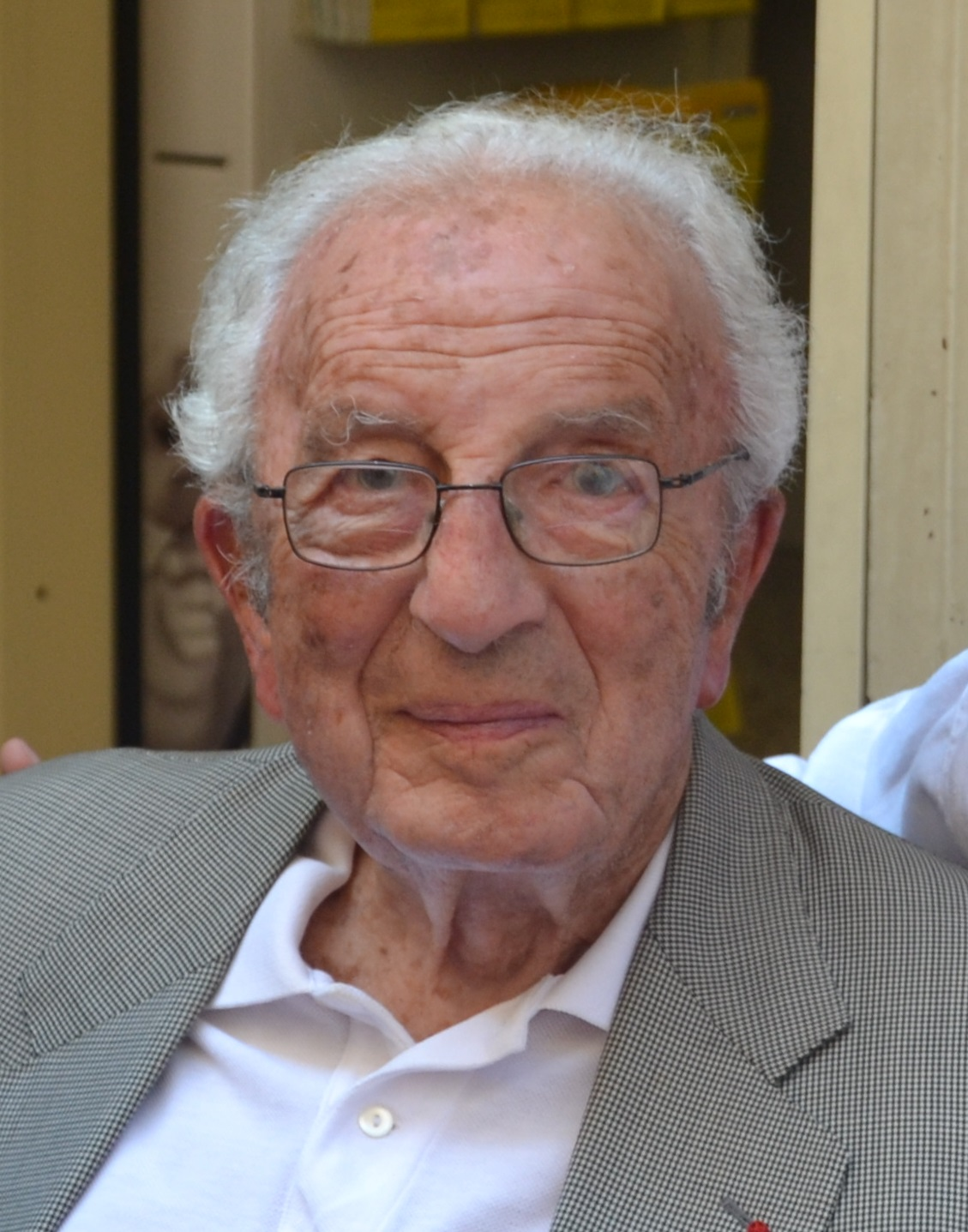
- Born: 20 November 1923
- Died: 10 January 2017 (aged 93); Provence, France
- Occupation: Food critic

Claude Lebey (20 November 1923 – 10 January 2017) was a French food critic and the author of Guide Lebey.

== Early life ==
Claude Lebey was born on 20 November 1923.

== Career ==
Lebey began his career in the textile industry, where he became a chief executive. He later became a culinary critic for L'Express, followed by Gault Millau. He was also the editor of cookbooks. For example, he edited Michel Guérard's cookbook. In 1987, he began publishing the annual Guide Lebey des Restaurants de Paris and the Lebey des Bistrots de Paris et sa banlieue. He sold the Lebey brand to Gérald de Roquemaurel et Pierre-Yves Chupin in 2011. A year later, he published his memoir.

Lebey was the founder of the Club des Croqueurs de Chocolat, a non-profit organization for "chocolate biters", in 1981. With Jacques Pessis, he was the co-founder of the Association de sauvegarde de l'oeuf mayonnaise (ASOM), a non-profit organization for the defense of egg mayonnaise, in 1990. He was also the founder of Les Amis des bistrots parisiens and Le Club des amateurs de cigares de Havane.

Lebey ate in restaurants 300 times a year.

== Death ==
Lebey died on 10 January 2017 in Provence, at the age of 93. Upon his death, chef Yannick Alléno called him "a visionary".

== Selected works ==
- Lebey, Claude (1987). Le petit Lebey des bistrots parisiens. Paris: Albin Michel.
- Lebey, Claude (1987). Guide Lebey des restaurants de Paris. Paris: Albin Michel.
- Lebey, Claude. L'Inventaire du patrimoine culinaire de la France. Vol. 1–20. Paris: Albin Michel.
- Lebey, Claude (2012). À table! : La vie intrépide d'un gourmet redoutable. Paris: Albin Michel. ISBN 9782226240187. OCLC 793946280.
