= Jean-Paul Hévin =

French chocolatier

Jean-Paul Hévin (born 10 December 1957 in Méral, Mayenne, France) is a French manufacturer of high-end chocolate, who operates 6 stores in Paris, 11 in Japan, 1 in Hong Kong, and 2 stores in Taipei headquartered in Paris.

== Career ==
In 1974 Hevin earned a vocational certificate as a confectioner/chocolatier and ice cream maker. The next year he began working as an apprentice confectioner at the Intercontinental Hotel. In 1976 Hevin moved to the Nikko hotel as an apprentice confectioner, then as pastry chef until 1988. That year Hévin opened his first shop ("Le Petit Boulé") on Avenue de la Motte-Picquet, Paris. He opened another shop in Rue Vavin in 1990 and a tea house in Rue Saint Honoré in 1997.

In 2002, he moved into the Japanese market by opening two chocolate-themed bars. He had previously worked in Japan as head of the Peltier laboratory in Tokyo. Over the years Hévin gradually opened more stores in Paris and Japan along with releasing confectionery products including cheese-flavored chocolate appetizers and chocolate energy bars.

In March 2008, he opened two shops in Hong Kong.

== Personal life ==
Jean-Paul Hévin's father was a farmer in Mayenne. His mother, who liked to cook, taught him how to make his first recipes. Although his father liked to eat confectionery, cakes were not their first priority. He only started to make pastry when he was 13, starting with simple pies. Hévin wanted to be an electronic engineer at first, applying to a school in his area. He missed the application date and decided to learn pastry instead. He attended Laval's technical school Robert-Buron, where he earned his certificate as a confectioner/chocolate maker.

== Contests and awards ==
As of 2005 he had won many awards:

- 1979 : Gold medal, Arpajon Gourmet Contest
- 1980 : First prize, Charles Proust contest
- 1982 : First Prize, French Cup of Pastry
- 1983 : First Prize, World Chocolat Master
- 1984 : First Prize, Arpajon Gourmet Contest
- 1986 : Best French Workman (Meilleur Ouvrier de France) - Pastry and Confectionery
- 2003 : Five Bars, Club des Croqueurs de Chocolat
- 2004 : #1 chocolate maker in Japan, Nikkei Shinbun
- 2005 : Paris' Best Macaroon, in the "Classic" category
