= Xenia Tchoumitcheva =

Russian-Swiss fashion influencer and entrepreneur (born 1987)

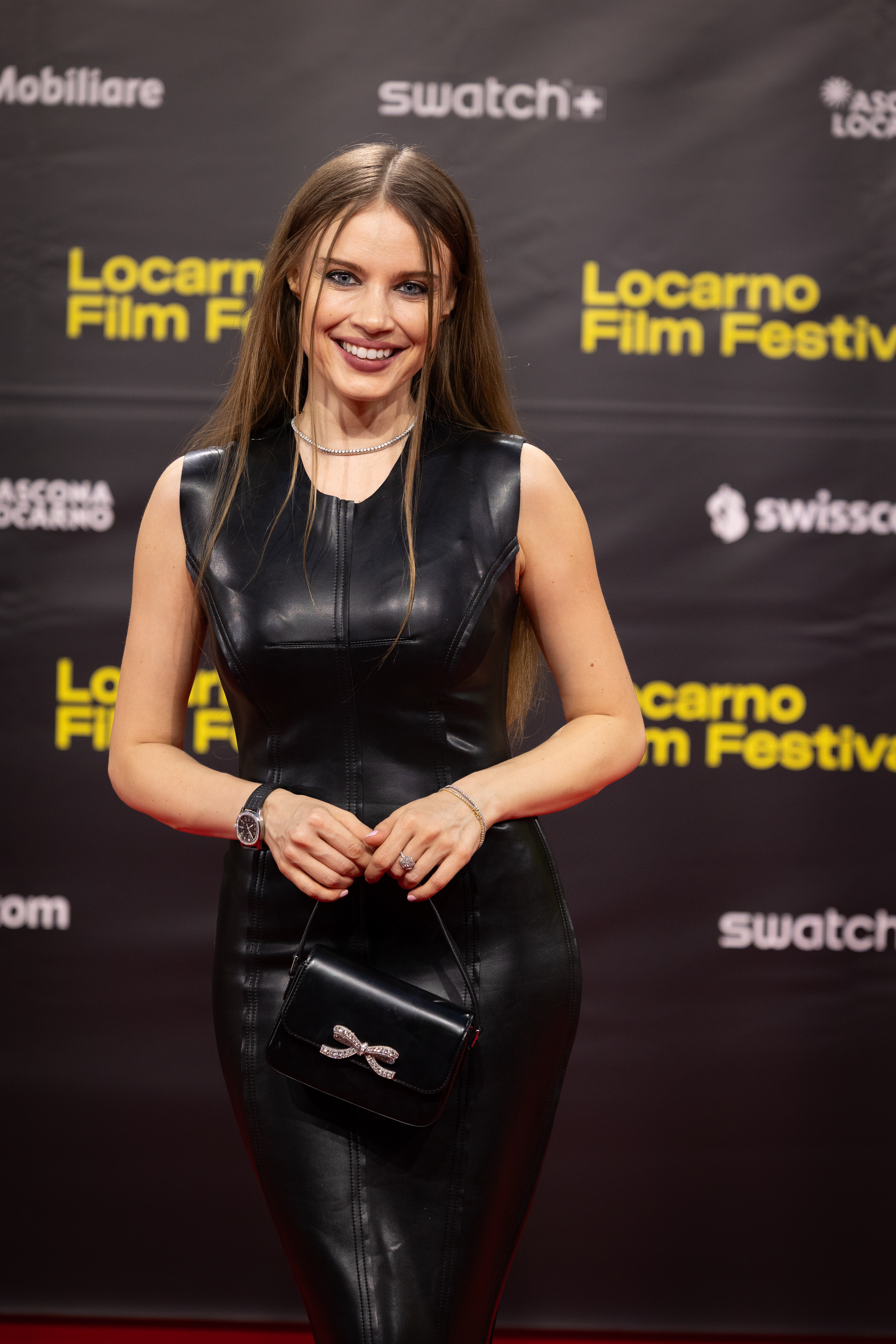
- Tchoumitcheva in 2026
- Born: Ксения Чумичева; 5 August 1987 (age 39); Magnitogorsk, Russian SFSR, Soviet Union
- Modeling information
- Height: 1.73 m (5 ft 8 in)
- Hair color: Brown
- Eye color: Blue
- Agency: CAA
- Website: www.xeniatchoumi.com

Xenia Tchoumitcheva (Ксения Чумичева, born 5 August 1987), known professionally as Xenia Tchoumi, is a Swiss model, entrepreneur, and content creator.

== Early years ==
Xenia Tchoumitcheva was born in Magnitogorsk, Russia. When she was 6 years old her family emigrated to Lugano, Switzerland. Tchoumitcheva lived in the Italian part of Switzerland, before moving to London, England.

She graduated in 2010 from the Università della Svizzera italiana with a Bachelor Degree in economics. She speaks Italian, Russian, German, French, English and Spanish.

Tchoumitcheva has interned at several financial institutions such as Merrill Lynch, the London hedge fund Duet Group and JP Morgan Chase.

== Career ==
=== Modelling experiences ===
Tchoumitcheva began modelling at the age of 12. She entered the Miss Switzerland pageant in 2006, where she was named 1st runner-up and Miss Photogenic. For the first time, the Miss Switzerland organization offered Tchoumitcheva an appearance contract similar to that of the winner. After the contest she was described as the "most eligible single woman in Switzerland". In May 2009 she was voted as the Best Bikini Body, in a survey by the magazine Schweizer Illustrierte. In 2012 she was profiled in the Spanish GQ magazine.

In December 2012, the Swiss edition of Maxim magazine put her on the cover, awarding her the title of "Most Beautiful Woman of the Year".

Tchoumitcheva has worked with several modelling agencies including Option Model Agency (Zürich), Oxygen Models, Tess Management, and Elite Model Management (Barcelona and Miami).

She was named as one of the 99 most influential women in the world for 2016, according to the AskMen annual list for the category influencers.

As a digital influencer, she collaborates with Ferragamo, Dior and Vogue. In autumn 2016 she shot fashion editorials with magazines including ELLE, Vanity Fair and L'Officiel. She has worked with brands including Chopard, L'Oréal, Moët & Chandon, Bulgari, American Express, Tom Ford and Samsung.

In September 2019, Tchoumi signed a representation deal with the CAA talent agency covering television, endorsements, personal appearances and publishing. In September 2023 she made her catwalk debut at New York Fashion Week for Jovani's runway show.

=== Public speaker ===
Tchoumitcheva speaks regularly at universities and conferences about female leadership, as well as her online business, brand creation, and other topics. She spoke at the Swiss Web Program Festival, at the Cantonal Bank of Geneva, and at the University of St. Gallen Alumni Conference, where she also interviewed the ex-Deutsche Bank CEO Josef Ackermann. In September 2015 she gave a TEDx talk about female leadership and internet against prejudice.

In 2017, she gave a talk at the United Nations HQ about the power of digital women, and was officially nominated an ITC SheTrades ambassador.

=== Actress ===
Tchoumitcheva began to work in commercials and music videos in 2007 (e.g. "Candino-Festina"). She starred in the short movie Les Enfants de la Honte of the French film maker Alain Margot, which appeared on the NIFF film festival. She was in the music video with Italian-Swiss singer Paolo Meneguzzi in May 2010. In June 2011, she had a supporting role in the short film Lines.

After graduating from the university in 2010, she travelled to New York City and took acting classes at the New York Film Academy.

In January 2011, Tchoumitcheva finished shooting a role as a rockstar in the French cinema production Bob et Les Sex Pistaches starring the French actor Jules Sitruk. She also appeared in the film Without Men with Eva Longoria and Christian Slater in 2011.

=== TV host ===
Among several hosting engagements, she presented the Miss Switzerland 2011 pageant live on the three national channels on 24 September 2011.

In March 2012 Tchoumicheva started to host her own TV show about successful Italian businesses called "L'Italia che funziona", on Italian channels Rete 4 and Italia1. She also hosted Miss Ukraine 2012 in Russian, alongside the Russian comedians "Prozhektorperiskhilton" (ПрожекторПерисхилтон).

In April 2013, Tchoumitcheva was the official host and catwalk model of the annual Energy Fashion Night with Irina Shayk.

Since 2013, Tchoumitcheva works as a journalist for the Swiss economic magazine Bilan and has her own online show called La Recette de Mon Succès.

=== Spokesmodel ===
Tchoumitcheva has modelled for different brands including Visilab Sunglasses, Audi, Burger King and Casino Lugano. In 2012, she was the official face of the Spanish airline Air Europa, Revlon cosmetics and Nikon cameras. In 2015, Xenia becomes the official brand ambassadress for Swiss Smile luxury products. She also collaborated for her blog as the official fashion influencer with the Pirelli Calendar 2015, together with Scott Schumman from the blog The Sartorialist In 2016, Xenia's yearly partnership with the luxury watch brand IWC was announced.

=== Writer ===
As of 2012, Tchoumitcheva co-writes a monthly column for the cultural magazine Schweizer Monat and the luxury US magazine Haute Living. She also launched her own online business and luxury blog called "Chic Overdose" in the spring of 2013.

In December 2020, Tchoumitcheva’s book Empower Yourself was published by Watkins Media, with international distribution by Penguin Random House. The book addresses themes of motivation, independent thinking, and gender equality.

== Professional name ==
As of 2015, Xenia changed her official public name to the shortened version Xenia Tchoumi, as it is easier for English speakers to pronounce since she moved to London.
