= Chocolat Tobler =

Swiss chocolate manufacturer

- Industry: Confectionery
- Founded: 1868 (confectionery), 1899 (chocolate factory)
- Founders: Johann Jacob (Jean) Tobler; Theodor Tobler
- Headquarters: Bern, Switzerland
- Products: Chocolate, including Toblerone
- Number of employees: 500–900 (1910–1925)
- Parent: Kraft Foods (from 1990)

Chocolat Tobler, or Tobler, is a Swiss chocolate company in Bern. It grew out of a confectionery that Johann Jacob (Jean) Tobler opened in 1868; his son Theodor Tobler built a chocolate factory in 1899, and in 1908 the company launched Toblerone, which became its best-selling product. Tobler merged with Suchard in 1970; in 1990 it passed to the American group Philip Morris, which incorporated it into its subsidiary Kraft Foods.

== History ==
A railway wagon advertising Chocolat Tobler, promoting milk and crémant chocolate

Johann Jacob Tobler (1830–1905), known as Jean, a confectioner from Appenzell, opened a confectionery in Bern in 1868. Following the development of milk chocolate and conching in the Swiss chocolate industry, his son Theodor joined the business in 1894 and in 1899 built a chocolate factory, whose products sold well. In 1902 Tobler was converted into a joint-stock company (Aktiengesellschaft). From 1910 to 1925, with 500 to 900 employees, the firm was the largest industrial employer in the city of Bern. It also took over businesses in Turin, Lugano, Bordeaux and Laupen.

By the turn of the century, the company sold milk chocolate, crémant ('melting') chocolate, cocoa powder, and chocolate pralines. In 1908, Tobler launched Toblerone, which became its best-selling product.

The company ran into financial difficulties in 1912, 1929 and 1931, after which it was restructured by Otto Wirz in 1931–1932. After World War II, sales rose sharply again. In 1970 the company merged with Suchard. In 1982 the coffee producer Klaus Jacobs acquired a majority of the shares, and in 1990 he sold his stake to Philip Morris, which incorporated Tobler into Kraft Foods. In 1984 Tobler moved its production from the Länggasse quarter of Bern to Bern-Brünnen, from where its chocolate specialties are exported to more than 100 countries.

== Bibliography ==
- P. Feuz, A. Tobler, Schoggibaron, 1996 (2nd edition 1998)
- Y. Leimgruber et al. (eds.), Chocolat Tobler, 2001
- P. Feuz et al., Toblerone, 2008

=== Archives ===
- Musée d'art et d'histoire de Neuchâtel, Suchard-Tobler archive
