= Swiss Smile =

Swiss chain of dental clinics

- Industry: Dental clinics and oral hygiene products
- Founded: 2002
- Key people: Haleh Abivardi, Golnar Abivardi (founders), Jürg Trepp (CEO)
- Parent: Jacobs Holding, Haleh and Golnar Abivardi
- Website: www.swiss-smile.com/en/

Swiss Smile is a chain of dental clinics from Switzerland. Founded by dentists and entrepreneurs Golnar and Haleh Abivardi, the company runs branches in various locations besides offering luxury products for oral hygiene.

== History ==
Having grown up in St. Gallen and Basel, and after finishing school and their dentistry studies in Zürich, Haleh and Golnar Abivardi, started working as employed dentists in Zürich. In 2002 they founded Swiss Smile and its first clinic in the Zürich ShopVille shopping mall in 2003. Inspired by the long opening hours of the mall, they wanted to offer the full service dentistry package of their clinic 365 days a year featuring long opening hours.

In 2007 Swiss Smile started expanding its business in Switzerland and internationally, opening branches in e.g. St. Moritz, Moscow or London with the latter being closed in 2010. The same year, the chain launched its product line offering luxury products for oral hygiene, including toothpaste and -brushes and dental floss.

The Abivardi sisters won the Veuve Clicquot Business Woman of the Year award for Switzerland in 2007.

As part of the Dentacare project in Zürich, Swiss Smile is collaborating with Sozialwerke Pfarrer Sieber offering free dental services for people in need who cannot afford treatment on their own.

In 2013 the Swedish private equity group EQT AB acquired a minority interest in Swiss Smile. A few years later, in 2017, the Jacobs Holding bought the controlling interest from EQT AB and the Abivardi sisters for 50 Million Swiss francs; the Abivardi sisters remained invested and actively engaged in Swiss Smile.

As of March 2019 the chain runs its clinics in 20 locations in Switzerland, including eight in Zürich and its surrounding area, among other cities such as Aarau, Bern, St. Moritz and Zug. Internationally, Swiss Smile runs one center in Moscow (Russia). Formerly Swiss Smile used to run branches in other European cities like London from 2007 to 2010, but they partly closed them down, focussing mostly on Switzerland with the exception of keeping their clinic in Moscow.

== Products ==
The Swiss company runs — apart from their dental clinics — a sortiment of oral hygiene products. It offers toothpaste -brushes and dental floss. The products are settled in the upper price class, offering luxurious designs and ingredients such as gold- or diamond particles in their toothpastes. Mostly aimed at the US market, South America, Asia, Russia.
