= Newsells Park =

Country house in Hertfordshire, England

Coordinates: 52.0268°N 0.0140°E

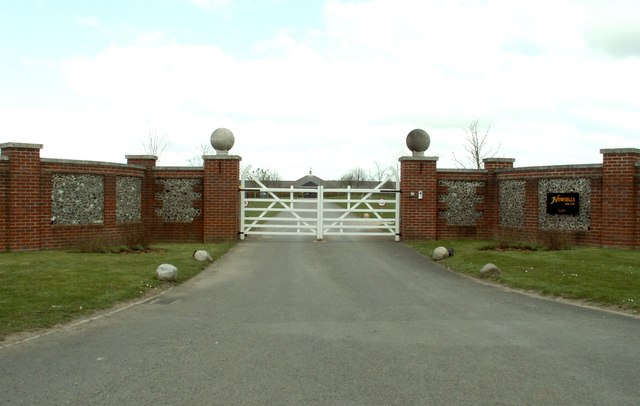
Entrance to the eastern section of Newsells Park Stud

Newsells Park is a country house and estate at Barkway in Hertfordshire.

== History ==
The estate and the original manor house, built in the late 17th century, was acquired by Admiral Sir John Jennings in 1721 and was his home until he died in 1743. His son, George Jennings, commissioned Richard Woods to lay out the park in 1763. The main house went on to become the family home of Field Marshal Lord Strathnairn in the early 1880s. Strathnairn was keen on horses and had an obelisk erected in memory of his favourite charger which he had ridden during the Indian Mutiny.

Sir Humphrey de Trafford, a prominent racehorse owner, acquired the house in 1926 and lived there with his family until the house burnt down during the Second World War. De Trafford had a new house built and continued to live on the estate, breeding famous racehorses including Alcide, who won the 1958 St. Leger Stakes and the 1959 King George VI and Queen Elizabeth Stakes, and Parthia, who won the 1959 Epsom Derby, until his death in 1971. The estate continues to operate as an active horse stud and from 2000 to 2021 was owned by Jacobs Holding AG until it was sold to tech entrepreneur Graham Smith-Bernal.
