= Jacques Genin =

French chef, cookery book writer, and chocolatier

Jacques Génin is a French chef, cookery book writer, and well-known chocolate and caramel maker in Paris.

He supplies chocolates, caramels and petits fours to more than 200 top French hotels and restaurants, including the Hôtel de Crillon, the Plaza Athénée and Le Meurice. His chocolate factory has been described by the New York Times as "a holy site for connoisseurs," and in 2008, he opened a shop selling to the public in the Marais neighbourhood of Paris.

Genin is not a qualified maître chocolatier under the French system, but is self-taught, and has described himself as a rebel. He began his career in food in a slaughterhouse, opened his first restaurant when he was 28, and at age 33 worked as head pâtissier at the global chocolate company La Maison du Chocolat. In 2010, he was named one of the top French chocolatiers by the Club des Croqueurs de Chocolat.

His daughter, Jade, formerly a lawyer, has also opened a chocolate store in Paris.
