= Graham Smith-Bernal =

British innovator and entrepreneur

- Born: January 17, 1958 (age 68); England
- Known for: Legal software
- Notable work: LiveNote, Opus 2 Magnum
- Children: 3
- Awards: The Queen's Award for Enterprise

Graham Smith-Bernal (born 17 January 1958) is a British innovator and entrepreneur. His companies, Smith-Bernal International and Opus 2 International, created technologies which facilitated virtual and hybrid court, arbitral and public enquiry hearings and led to paperless trials throughout multiple global jurisdictions.

== Early life ==
Smith-Bernal grew up and went to school in Slough, Berkshire. He left school with a single ‘O’ level. After business college he joined the UK’s first stenography course becoming, while still a teenager, one of the UK’s first qualified court stenographers. His first job was as an official court reporter in London Crown Courts, High Courts and arbitrations.

== Career ==
In 1990, Smith-Bernal devised the interactive real-time transcription and evidence management system, LiveNote. In 2011, he created the cloud-based collaborative software platform, Opus 2 Magnum for managing evidence in major disputes and inquiries.

Previously, in 1981, Smith-Bernal set up his first business, Smith-Bernal International (SBI), specialising in providing verbatim reporting services in litigation, arbitration and public inquiry hearings. A year later SBI was appointed as Official Court Reporter to the 11 Crown Courts at Knightsbridge and subsequently to a further 70 courts in 8 UK cities. SBI pioneered the introduction of computer-aided transcription and a digital transcript management software. Each sped up transcriptions and provided lawyers with digital transcripts.

In 1990 SBI’s new software division created the world’s first Windows based real-time interactive software transcription programme, LiveNote. This enabled lawyers to annotate and search live real-time transcript testimony, reducing manual note taking performed by judges and lawyers in complex hearings. Its creation saw SBI appointed to hearings including BCCI and Lloyds of London disputes. The technology was used by the defence team on the OJ Simpson trial in Los Angeles in 1995 and in Lord Saville’s Bloody Sunday Inquiry established in 1998 by British Prime Minister, Tony Blair. After selling SBI in 1997, Smith-Bernal retained the US software business and saw LiveNote become a standard for managing deposition hearings, with more than 80% of the top 100 US law firms signed up on enterprise licenses. In 2006, LiveNote was sold to Thomson Reuters for an undisclosed sum.

In 2011 Smith-Bernal set up Opus 2 International to develop the company’s Magnum software. This facilitated seamless collaboration between remote and in-court teams of lawyers and their clients across all case materials, transcripts and documents as well as synchronised audio and video. It was first used in the Berezovsky v Abramovich trial in London in 2012, where it saved more than 5 million pieces of hard copy paper. In 2018, for his work with Opus 2 and Magnum, Smith-Bernal received the Queen’s Award for Enterprise for Innovation.

Following the sale of Opus 2 in 2017, Smith-Bernal bought Newsells Park Stud - a commercial stud farm in North Hertfordshire breeding classic and Group One racehorses.

== Personal ==
Smith-Bernal is married with three children.
