= Paul A. Young =

English chef

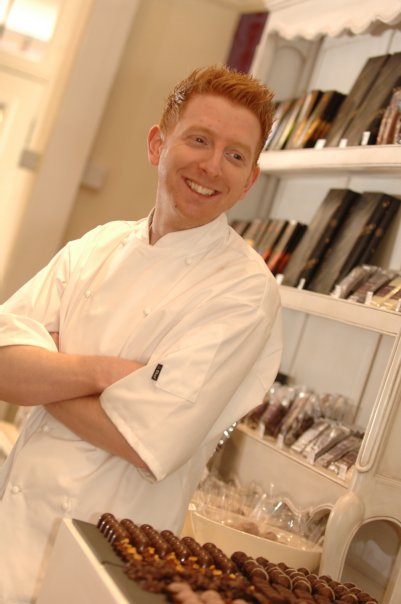
- Born: Paul Andrew Young; July 28, 1973 (age 53); Barnsley, South Yorkshire, England
- Education: Leeds Metropolitan University
- Occupations: Chocolatier and pâtissier
- Known for: Paul A Young Fine Chocolates
- Website: www.paulayoung.co.uk

Paul Andrew Young (born 28 July 1973) is an English chocolatier, pâtissier and television personality.

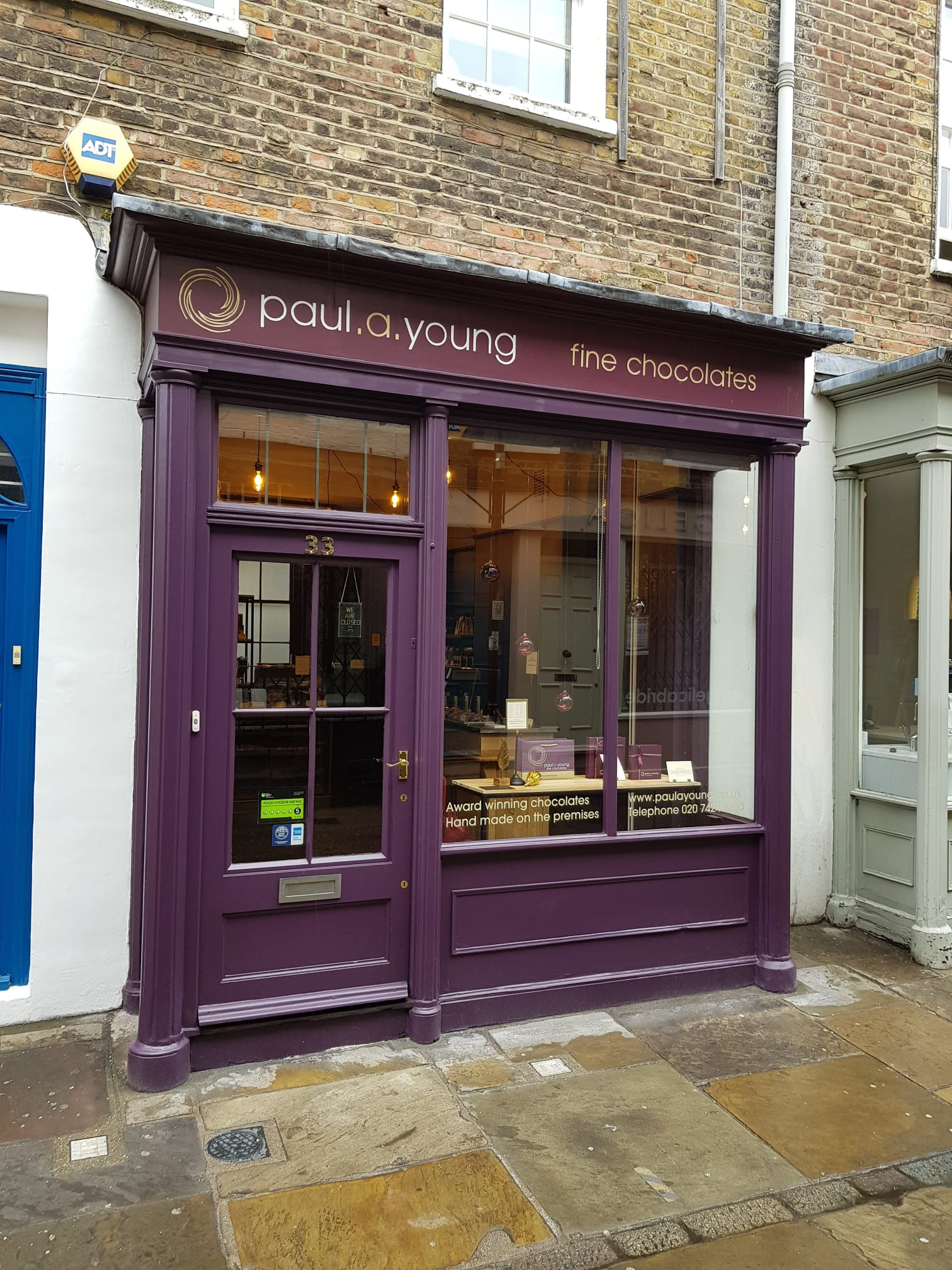
Paul A Young storefront in Camden Passage, London. The shop closed in 2023.

== Early life and education ==
Young was born in Barnsley, South Yorkshire, Young's parents divorced when he was 18 months old, and as a result he and his brother were raised by their mother in Trimdon Station, County Durham. He attended Wellfield Community School until the age of 15, when he left to attend New College Durham in order to study hotel catering and management. Upon completing his foundation course at New College, Young subsequently attended Leeds Metropolitan University.

Young relocated to London after leaving university and worked as Head Pastry Chef under Marco Pierre White at The Criterion Brasserie and Quo Vadis. Young then left Quo Vadis to work as a product developer for Marks & Spencer and Sainsbury's, before founding his own company, Paul A. Young Fine Chocolates Ltd, with business partner James Cronin in 2004.

== Work ==
Paul A. Young Fine Chocolates opened their first chocolaterie, in Camden Passage, Islington, in 2006. A second shop would open the following year in The Royal Exchange, and a third on Soho's Wardour Street would follow in June, 2011. The Royal Exchange store closed c. August 2019 due to rent increases.

In 2023, Young announced the closure of his London shops. On 31 July 2023, the final Camden Passage shop shut down permanently.

Young launched his first chocolate cookbook entitled Adventures with Chocolate in 2012 via Kyle Books. His second book Sensational Chocolate was released in 2016 via Clearwater Publishing. The book featured recipes from 50 celebrities including Emma Thompson and Nigella Lawson, and all profits went to the Children's Air Ambulance, of which Young was an Ambassador.

Young has appeared on a variety of cookery shows including Saturday Kitchen and This Morning, typically sharing different chocolate recipes or acting as an expert/judge.

In 2019, Young controversially used the divisive flavour of the Durian fruit (popular in Southeast Asia) in a campaign to draw attention to Domestic Violence on behalf of Woman’s Trust. He subsequently apologised for any offence he may have inadvertently caused towards the Southeast Asian community.

== Personal life ==
Young is in a relationship with partner Luke. In addition to serving as an Ambassador to the Children's Air Ambulance, Young also served as Vice-President of The Sick Children's Trust.

== Filmography ==
=== Television ===
Year	Title	Role	Notes	Channel
2013	Paul Hollywood's Pies and Puds	Self	Episode 6	BBC One
2016	The Saturday Show	Self	Episode 16	Channel 5
2017	The Sweet Makers	Self	1 series (four episodes)	BBC Two
2019–2020	This Morning	Self	2 episodes (4 Dec 2019 and 12 Feb 2020)	ITV
2019–2020	Saturday Kitchen	Self	5 episodes	BBC One
2020	Snackmasters	Self	1 episode	Channel 4
2023	Top Chef: World All-Stars	Self	1 episode S20 Ep4	Bravo (American TV network)

== Bibliography ==
- Adventures with Chocolate (2012) ISBN 978-0857830838
- Sensational Chocolate (2016) ISBN 978-1908337344
