= Fritz Knipschildt =

Danish chef and chocolatier

Fritz Knipschildt is a Danish chef and chocolatier.

== Early life and education ==
Born and raised in Odense, Denmark, Knipschildt began at the age of 13, working in a local restaurant as a dishwasher. He quickly advanced and before he had attended culinary school, Knipschildt was put in charge of the bistro kitchen of a new restaurant in the north of Copenhagen. After training at the Hotel and Restaurant School of Denmark, Knipschildt worked in the Mont Blanc area of France twice, and also in southern Spain. A few years later, he was able to move to the United States and worked as a private chef, after which he was sponsored by a French restaurant in New York City.

== Career ==
In 1999, he began making chocolates out of his small one-bedroom apartment, selling them to local retailers. Soon afterward he began supplying his chocolates to larger retailers such as Dean & Deluca and Martha Stewart, forming his company Knipschildt Chocolatier, LLC. In 2005, Knipschildt opened Chocopologie Café, which offers chocolates as part of a menu of classic bistro fare.
