= Toblerone =

Swiss chocolate brand

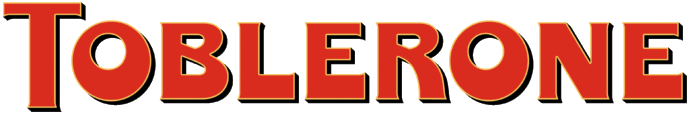

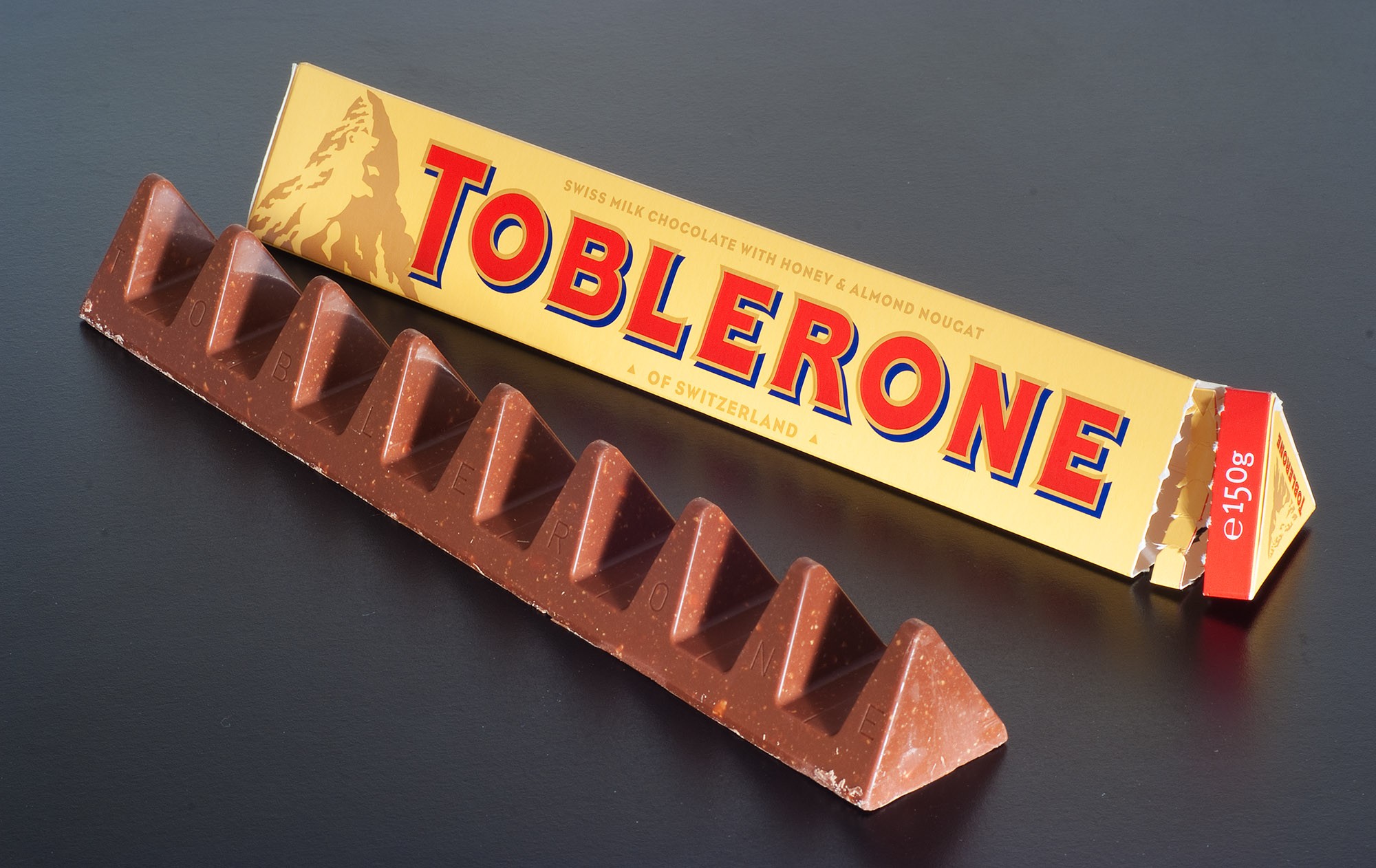
- The 2016-2018 chocolate bar and pre-2022 packaging
- Product type: Chocolate bar
- Current owner: Mondelēz International (U.S.)
- Country: Switzerland
- Introduced: 1908; 118 years ago
- Related brands: List of Kraft brands
- Previous owners: Kraft Foods Inc. (1990–2012); Jacobs Suchard AG (1982–90); Interfood S.A. (1970–82); Tobler (1908–70)
- Website: toblerone.ch

Toblerone (/ˈtoʊbləroʊn/ TOH-blə-rohn, German: [tobləˈʁoːnə], Swiss Standard German: [toblɛˈroːnɛ]) is a chocolate brand owned by Mondelez International (originally Kraft Foods). It was produced in Bern, Switzerland, except for some produced before 1970 in England and Scotland, until 2022, when Mondelez began producing some of it in Bratislava, Slovakia. Following the shift away from exclusively Swiss production, the labels were changed to say "created in Switzerland" rather than "made in Switzerland", and the graphic logo was changed to less resemble the Swiss peak Matterhorn.

Toblerone is known for its distinctive shape as a series of joined triangular prisms inspired by the Matterhorn mountain and lettering engraved in the chocolate. "Toblerone" is a portmanteau of "Tobler", the surname of its co-founder Theodor Tobler, and "torrone", the Italian word for nougat. The company was independent from 1899 until 1970, then merged with Suchard, then with Jacobs as Jacobs Suchard, then acquired by Kraft Foods—which has been renamed to Mondelez International—in 2012.

== History ==
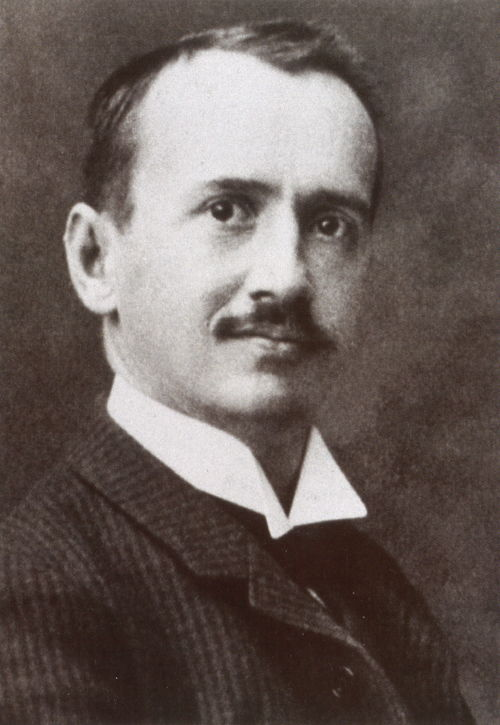
Theodor Tobler created the bar and its packaging.

The Tobler chocolate factory was founded in 1899 by Emil Baumann (1880–1960) & Theodor Tobler (1876–1941) in Bern. At the time, the Swiss chocolate industry was expanding dramatically as recently invented milk chocolate became widespread. In 1908, Emil Baumann, the cousin of Theodor Tobler, created the unique recipe consisting of milk chocolate including white nougat, almonds, and honey. Theodor Tobler came up with the distinctive triangular shape and packaging. The product's name is a combination of Tobler's name and the Italian word torrone (a type of nougat).

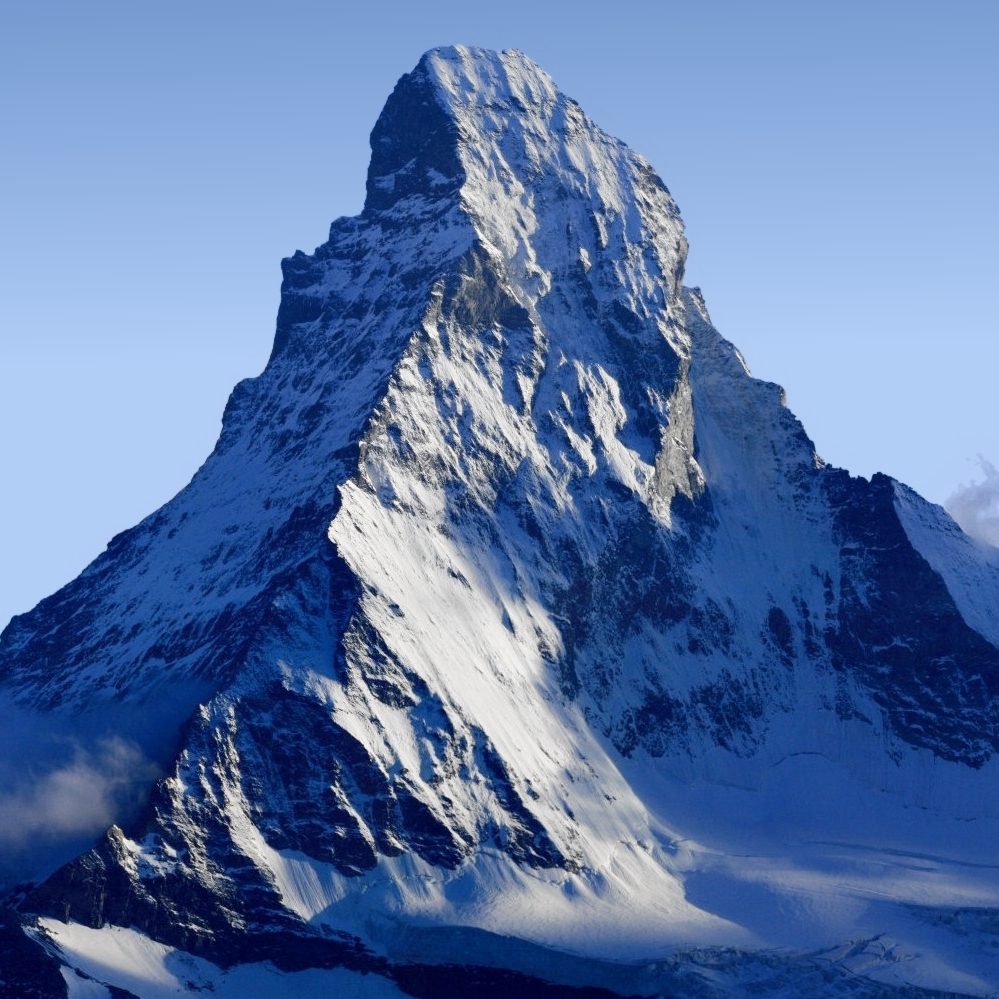
The Matterhorn in the Alps served as inspiration for the bar shape and was shown on the bar's logo until 2022.

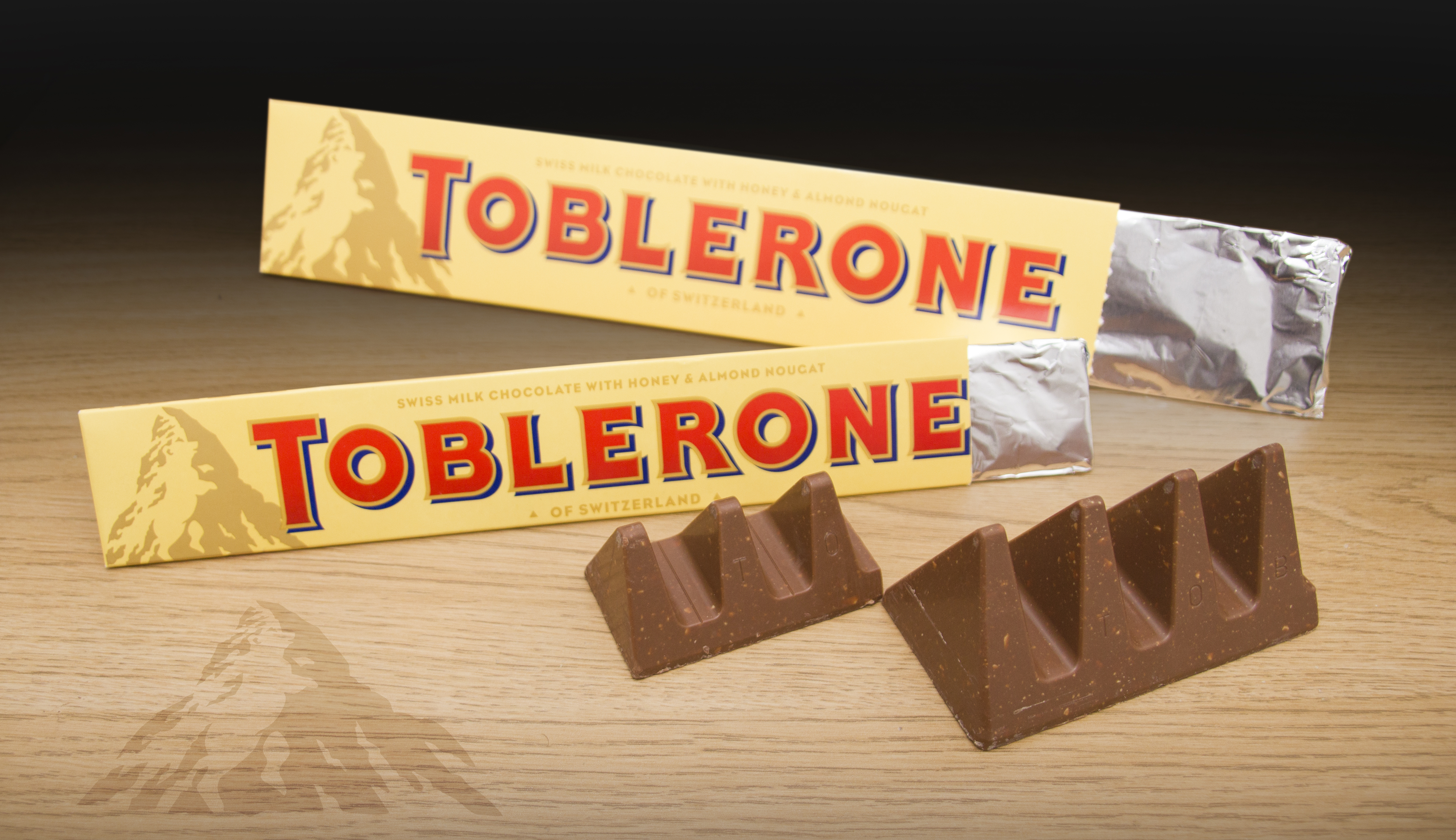
Packaging with Matterhorn inspired logo

The triangular shape of the Matterhorn in the Swiss Alps/Italian Alps is commonly believed to have given Theodor Tobler his inspiration for the shape of Toblerone. However, according to Theodor's sons, the triangular shape originates from a pyramid shape that dancers at the Folies Bergère created as the finale of a show that Theodor saw. Another source of inspiration could have been the similar triangular packaging of the Delta Peter brand. Nevertheless, a silhouette of the Matterhorn appeared on the modern Toblerone packaging used until 2022, when the iconography had to be abandoned for legal reasons due to production moving out of Switzerland. An outline of a bear, the symbol of Bern, is also depicted on the mountain on the packaging.

Theodor Tobler applied for a patent for the Toblerone manufacturing process in Bern in 1909. The Toblerone brand was trademarked the same year, at the Swiss Federal Institute of Intellectual Property in Bern. Albert Einstein, who was working at the institute as a clerk, might have been involved in the patenting. Toblerone was thus the first patented milk chocolate bar. It is probably also one of the oldest candy bars using milk chocolate, although not the first one; the Branche, another iconic product of the Swiss chocolate industry, had been launched a few years earlier.

A Toblerone version made of dark chocolate was launched in 1969. A white version was launched in 1973.

Some early advertisements for Tobler chocolate appeared in the international languages Esperanto and Ido.

The Tobler company was independent for many years. In 1970, it merged with Suchard, the makers of Milka, to become Interfood. After the Tobler & Suchard merger it was decided to create a new and single source for marketing & exporting the various products manufactured by both companies worldwide, Multifood. Max E. Baumann, the son of Emil Baumann, was made director of this new division. Tobler & Suchard companies merged with the Jacobs coffee company in 1982 to create Jacobs Tobler & Suchard. Kraft Foods Inc acquired the majority of Jacobs Suchard, including Toblerone, in 1990; in 2012, it was spun off (alongside several other brands) to Mondelēz.

== Sizes and variants ==
Bar sizes range from ten centimetres to nearly one metre, all similarly proportioned. According to Schott's Food & Drink Miscellany the sizes and number of peaks for Toblerones are as follows:

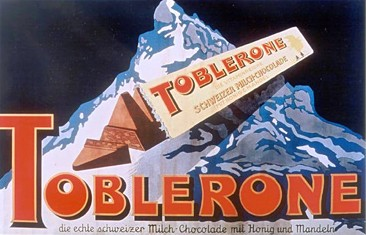
1920s advertisement in German language

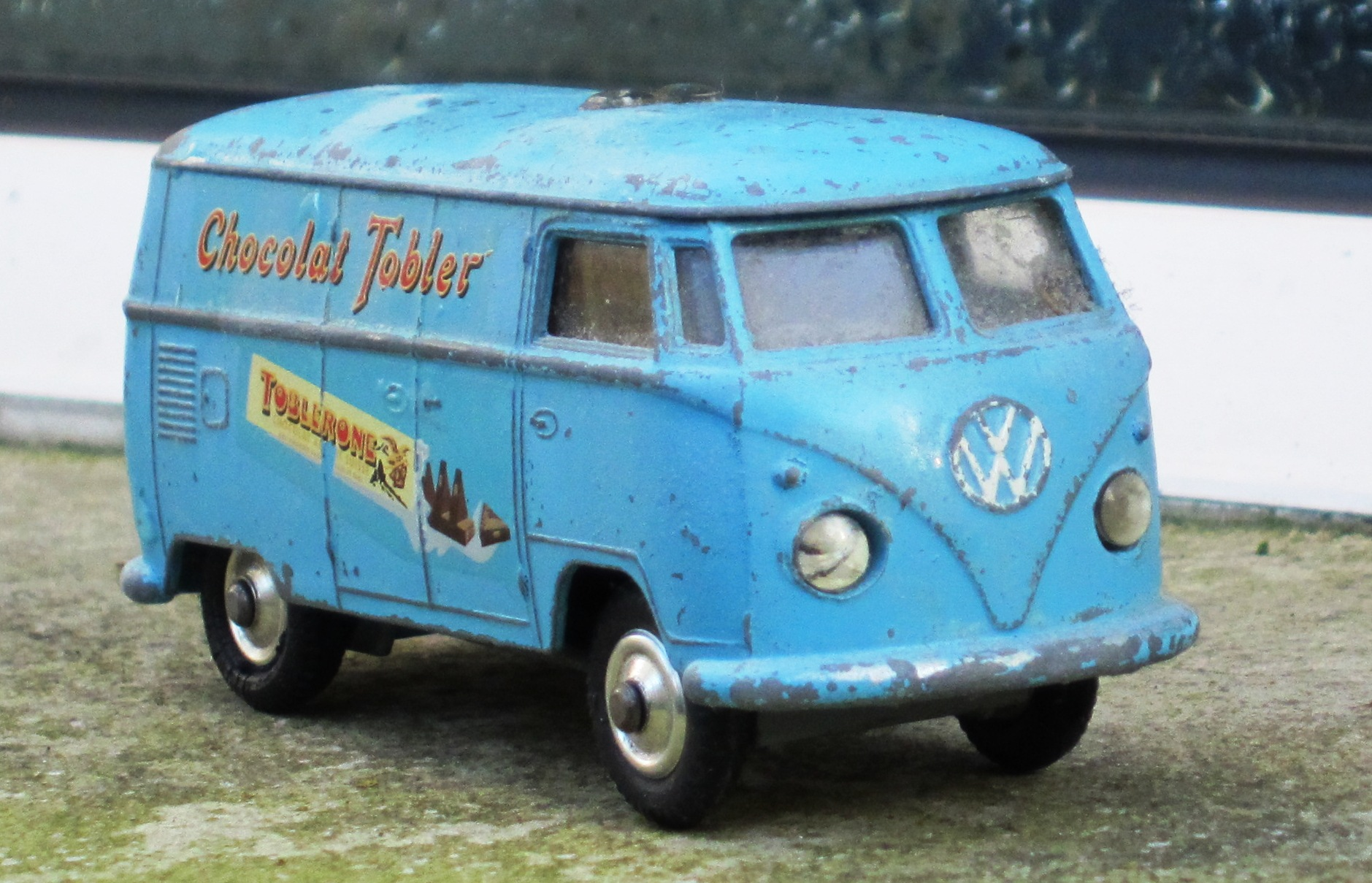
Advertising in the 1960s included the production of a model Volkswagen Type 2 by Corgi Toys, featuring Toblerone designs on its side panels.

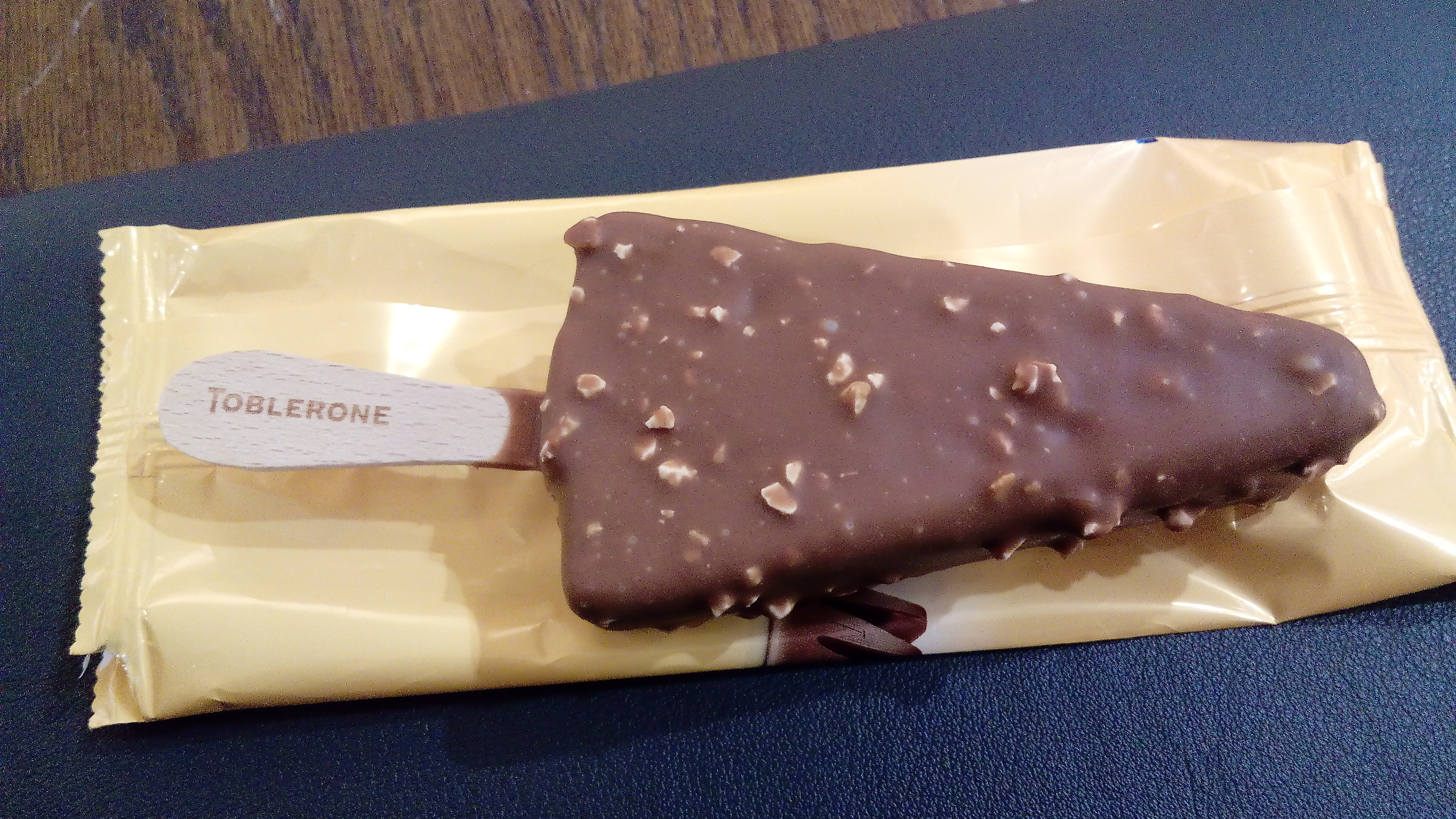
Toblerone ice cream

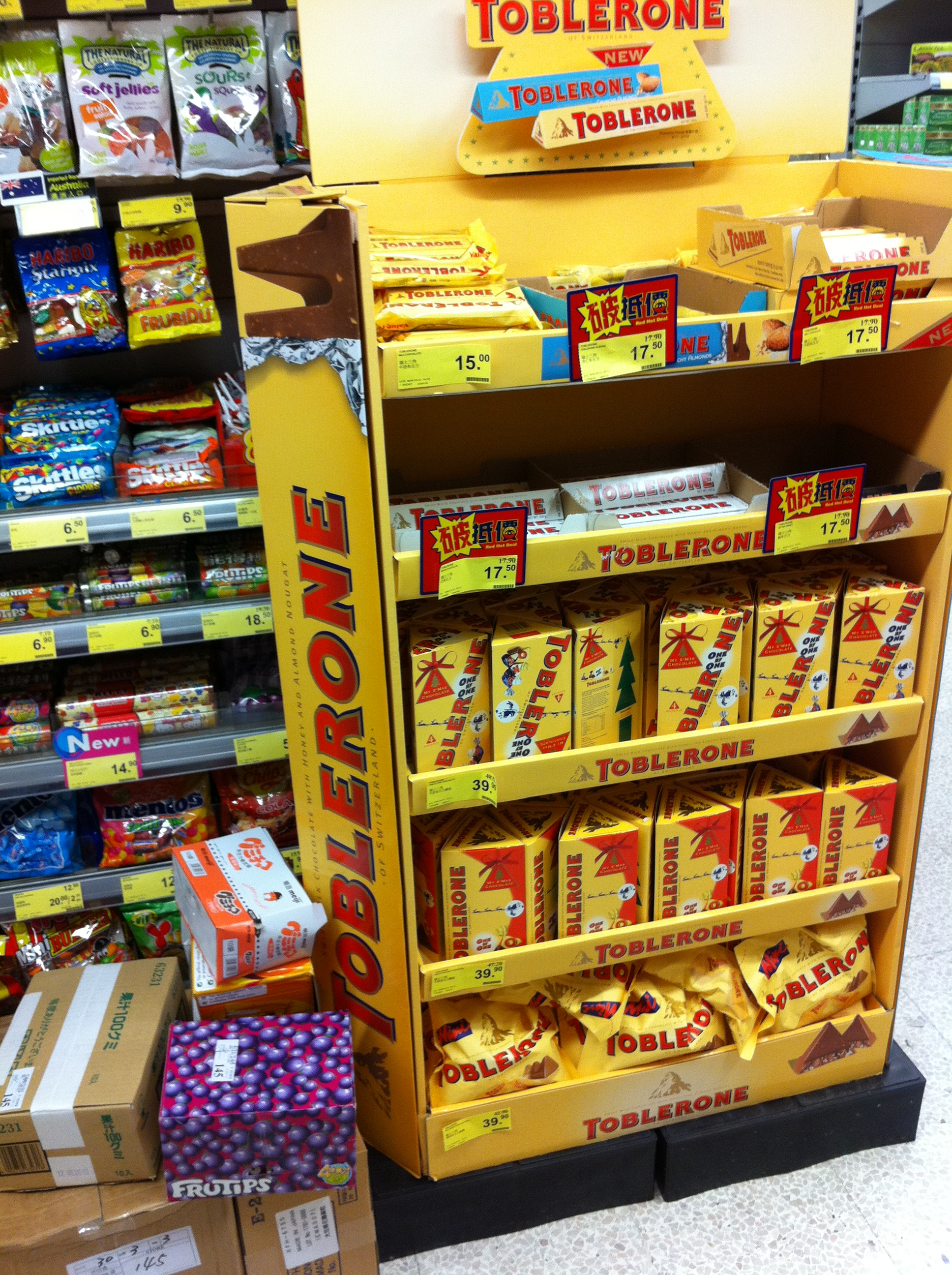
Toblerone displays in Hong Kong in 2012

| Size (g) | Tiny | Mini | 35 g | 50 g | 75 g | 100 g | 150 g | 200 g | 360 g | 750 g | 4.5 kg |
| Size (oz) | | | 1.2 oz | 1.7 oz | 2.6 oz | 3.5 oz | 5.3 oz | 7.0 oz | 12.7 oz | 26.5 oz | 159 oz |
| Peaks | 3 | 3 | 8 | 11 | 11 | 12 | 9 | 10 | 11 | 17 | 12 |

For the yearly Toblerone Schoggifest, a special oversized bar is created to celebrate the bar's anniversary. The bar's weight represents the years of Toblerone, with the first bar in 2008 weighing 100 kg.

Since 1969, other variants of Toblerone have been produced. These include:

Dark chocolate
In a black triangular box (1969)
White chocolate
In a white triangular box (1973)
Milk chocolate Mint Crisp
In a white/green triangular box (1985)
Snowtop
Editions with white chocolate peaks, also in a white/silver triangular box
Filled editions
Milk chocolate with a white chocolate centre (blue triangular box)
OneByOne
Individually wrapped triangular chunks
Toblerone Pralines
Released in 1997, a single peaked version in the distinctive beige packaging
Fruit & Nut
In 2007 with a half purple triangular cardboard box
Honeycomb crisp
With a half white box with honeycomb pieces pictured on it (2009)
Crunchy Salted Almond
With honey and almond nougat and salted caramelised almonds
Berner Bär
500 g milk chocolate bar, with a relief portrait of the Bernese Bear and the Coat of arms of Bern on its face. The only non-triangular Toblerone.
Toblerone Tobelle
Toblerone thins in a beige triangular box:
Crispy Coconut
With honey and almond nougat and coconut
Golden Caramel
Caramel with honey and almond nougat
Tobler Truffles
Limited edition, with personalizable box (2022)

=== 2016 size changes ===
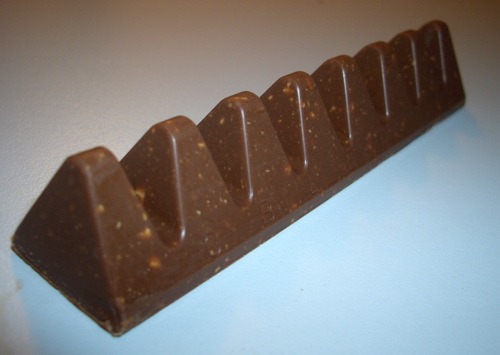
Pre-2016/post-2018 shape

In 2016, the 400 g and 170 g bars in the United Kingdom were modified to have two peaks removed and larger gaps between the peaks, which reduced the cost of making the bars by cutting the weight by about 10%, to 360 g and 150 g, while retaining the same package size and retail price. Other sizes were unaffected. The change was not well received, with one member of the Scottish Parliament calling for "government action" over the change. In 2018 the bar reverted to its original shape, and the 170 g/150 g bar was replaced by a 200 g bar.

== Manufacturing ==
In the past it was manufactured in other locations including Bedford in England, and Dundee in Scotland from the 1930s up to 1969.

Producer Mondelez planned to start additional limited production from the end of 2023 in a Slovak factory (known formerly as Figaro) in Bratislava. Swiss rules introduced in 2017 mandate that indicators of Swiss provenance such as packaging stating "Swiss" and showing images typical of Switzerland may not be used, so the bar labels were changed to say "created in Switzerland", and the image of the Swiss Matterhorn was replaced by a "modernised and streamlined mountain logo that aligns with the geometric and triangular aesthetic".

In April 2025, Mondelez International announced an investment of approximately 65 million Swiss francs (CHF) in its Toblerone manufacturing facility in Bern, Switzerland. The place serves as Toblerone's global center, where the heritage brand was founded in 1908 and where approximately 90 percent of Toblerone products sold worldwide are manufactured today. As a visual symbol of its Swiss heritage, Toblerone packaging for chocolates manufactured in Bern will now showcase the Swiss flag. This emphasises the product's origin.

Ingredients in a traditional Toblerone bar include sugar, whole milk powder, cocoa butter, cocoa mass, honey (3%), milk fat, almonds (1.6%), emulsifier (Soya Lecithin), egg white, flavouring, cocoa solids (28%) and milk solids (14%).

== Similar products ==
By 1920, the Toblerone recipe already faced competition from other manufacturers, for instance from another Swiss manufacturer, Cailler, who launched the Chocmel tablet that year. Another comparable chocolate made in Switzerland (in this case both for the ingredients and shape) is Mahony, produced by Frey.

In July 2017, in response to Toblerone's 2016 reduction in size, the British variety store chain Poundland launched its own version of Toblerone called "Twin Peaks", which is larger than the modified Toblerone bar.

== Cultural impact ==
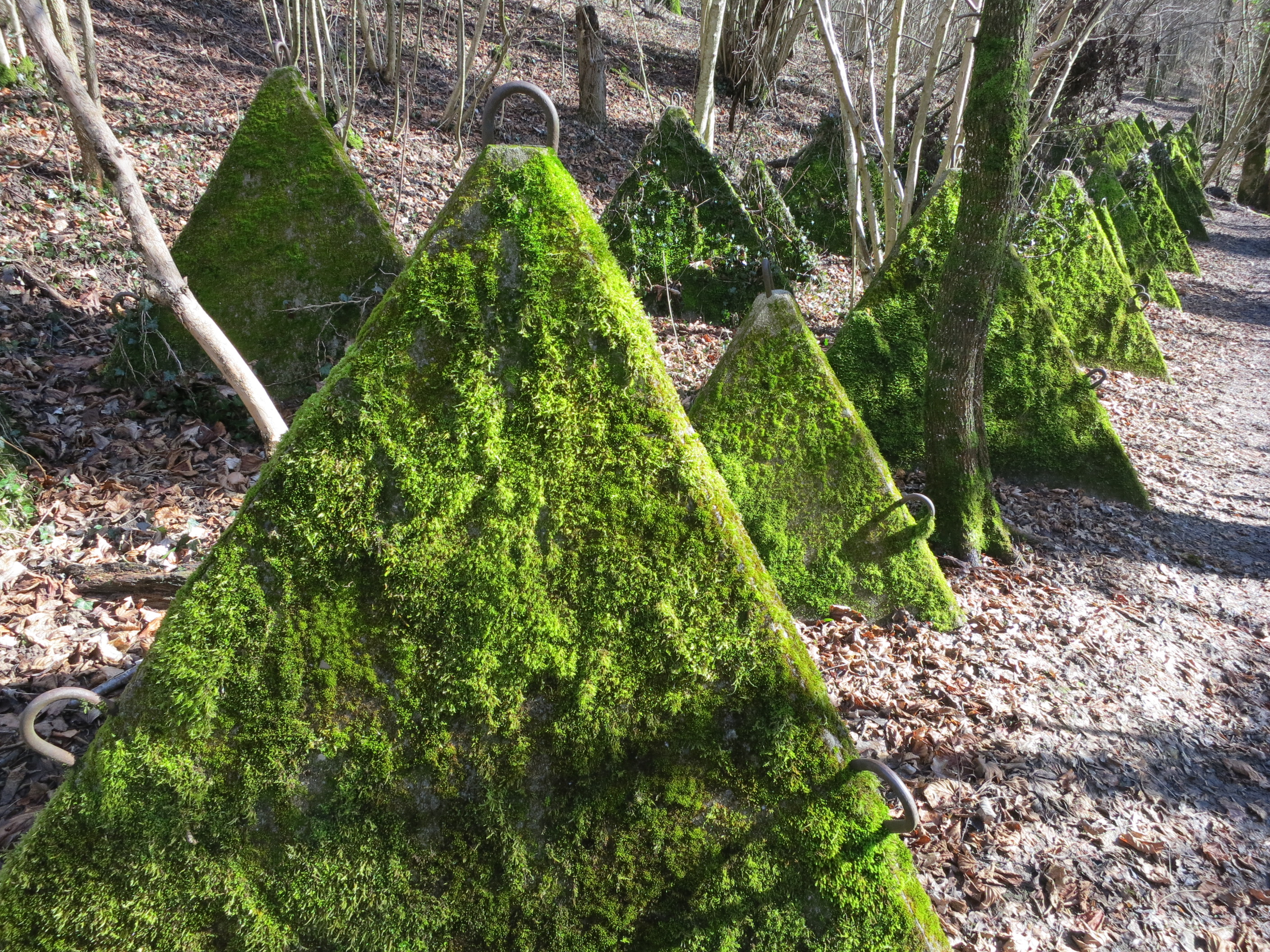
Moss-covered anti-tank pyramids, commonly referred to as "Toblerones"

The distinct pyramidal shape of the bar lent its name to the Toblerone line, a series of anti-tank emplacements from World War II era, prevalent in Switzerland's border areas.

The interior of the Tobler factory in Switzerland was the location where the title sequence of Willy Wonka & the Chocolate Factory (1971) was filmed. However, the majority of the film was produced in West Germany.

British comedy character Alan Partridge battled a longstanding addiction to Toblerones, which became a running gag of his TV series.

In 1995, it was revealed that the Swedish politician Mona Sahlin had misused her government-issued credit card for unauthorised purchases. Because she had bought, among many other more expensive items, two bars of Toblerone, pro-Sahlin journalists attempted to downplay her abuse of parliamentary financial privileges as the "Toblerone affair", but Sahlin was nevertheless forced to step down as a Prime Ministerial candidate. She returned to politics in 1998.

A triangular set of residences for students of the University of Manchester on the Oxford Road, Manchester, England, built in about 1975 are known as the Toblerones.

The largest-sized Toblerone in production is used as a running gag in the 2017 Netflix series Neo Yokio.

=== Association with air travel ===
Toblerone has long been associated with air travel and duty-free retail. Food writer and cookbook author Irvin Lin wrote:

It was something I associated with being a child, and that exclusivity of only getting it at the airport. Purchasing a Toblerone was very special for me. My friends' families would go on vacation and they brought back this chic, European, long triangle-shaped chocolate. I never saw [Toblerones] at a grocery store. I thought you could only get it at the airport or when you were traveling and part of the jet set.

Mondelez has leaned into this perception with a number of marketing campaigns to further associate the brand with travel. This includes the "Sense of Place" campaign in 2015, which involved limited edition travel destination-themed packaging and the #TravelisBack campaign in 2022, targeting younger travelers with social media influencer collaborations. In 2024 Toblerone's "Win a Diamond" concept tied with the iconic Toblerone shape, and slogans like "Diamonds are forever-ish" brought humor and style to the travelers' experience.

== See also ==
- List of references to the Matterhorn

== Bibliography ==
- Schott, Ben (2003). Schott's Food & Drink Miscellany. London: Bloomsbury ISBN 0-7475-6654-2
