= Klaus Johann Jacobs =

Swiss businessman (1936–2008)

- Jacobs circa 2000
- Born: December 3, 1936; Bremen, Germany
- Died: September 11, 2008 (aged 71); Küsnacht, Switzerland
- Other name: Klaus J. Jacobs
- Citizenship: Swiss
- Education: University of Hamburg; Stanford University
- Occupations: Food and beverage company founder, chocolatier
- Known for: Jacobs AG
- Spouse: Renata Jacobs
- Children: 6 (including Andreas Jacobs)

Klaus Johann Jacobs (3 December 1936 – 11 September 2008) was a German-born billionaire in the coffee and chocolate industry, with Swiss citizenship.

== Early life and education ==
He was born on 3 December 1936 in Bremen, Germany. Jacobs attended the University of Hamburg and later Stanford University.

== Career ==
He started his career in the global coffee and chocolates industries.

- In 1962, he became Director of Purchasing and Marketing for the Jacobs AG coffee business, the company founded by his great-uncle.
- In 1972 he became General Manager of the company.
- In 1982, the company merged with Interfood to create Jacobs Suchard AG, Europe's number one chocolate and coffee business.
- In 1987, Jacobs expanded his business in North America with acquisition of Brach's.
- In 1990, when most of the consumer-oriented elements of Jacobs Suchard were sold to Philip Morris, Jacobs created with Brach's and non-consumer businesses of Jacobs Suchard a company which is now known as Barry Callebaut. Barry Callebaut is today the world's largest raw chocolate producer being embroiled in both childslavery and deforestation of protected areas As a result of cocoa production, 7 of the 23 Ivorian protected areas have been almost entirely converted to cocoa.
- In 1991, Jacobs became also involved with the human resource services industry with the acquisition of Adia Personnel Services where he led the company to a Global Fortune 500 Company following the merger with Ecco in 1996 to form Adecco.

== Philanthropy ==
The Jacobs Foundation was established by Klaus J. Jacobs in December 1988, in Zurich, Switzerland. In 2001, the founder surrendered his entire share of the Jacobs Holding AG to the Jacobs Foundation, with an effective value of CHF 1.5 billion ($ 900 million). The Jacobs Foundation's goal is to contribute to Productive Youth Development by bringing together basic research, application and intervention projects and through dialogue and network building. The Jacobs Foundation supports research and projects worldwide. Klaus J. Jacobs donated EUR 200 million to the Jacobs University Bremen in 2006.

== Death ==
He died on 11 September 2008 in Küsnacht, Switzerland.

== Memberships ==
- World Scout Foundation
- President of the Friends of the Hohe Tauern National Park from 1996 to 1998
- Board of Directors of the Zurich Opera House since 2003
- Board of the Association of the Friends of Bayreuth

== Decorations and awards ==
- 2005: Honorary doctor of the Faculty of Psychology of the University of Basel
- 2005: Education Award of the College of Education Zurich for educational and youth projects
- 16 April 2008: Bremen Gold Medal of Honour for services rendered to the benefit of the city of Bremen
- 2008: Leibniz Medal of the Berlin-Brandenburg Academy of Sciences for his contributions to the advancement of science
- 1999: Silver World Award of the Boy Scouts of America
- 2005-2008: Bronze Wolf Award of the World Scout Committee
- 1991: Grand Gold Decoration for Services to the Republic of Austria
- 2000: Austrian Cross of Honour for Science and Art, 1st class

== Klaus J. Jacobs Awards ==
The Klaus J. Jacobs Research Award honours outstanding achievement in child and youth development and the Klaus J. Jacobs Best Practice Award for positive development of children and youth are awarded annually in memory of Jacobs. The first award ceremony took place on 3 December 2009. The awards are given by the Jacobs Foundation of Zurich.

=== Background ===
The prizes are given to honour outstanding achievements in research and practice that make a significant contribution to young people's success in life and development.

=== The Klaus J. Jacobs Research Award ===
The Klaus J. Jacobs Research Award recognises academic research of significant social relevance for child and youth development. Additionally, research findings from the interdisciplinary projects thus honoured should be suited to active practical implementation. The prize money for the award comes to one million Swiss Francs, which can be used for an academic project chosen by the recipient.

The award winner is chosen by a jury of internationally respected researchers: Albert Bandura (Stanford University, USA), Monique Boekaerts (Leiden University, the Netherlands), Jeanne Brooks-Gunn (Columbia University, USA), Anne C. Petersen Michigan University, USA), Meinrad Paul Perrez (Université de Fribourg, Switzerland), Rainer K. Silbereisen (Friedrich Schiller Universität Jena, Germany) and William Julius Wilson (Harvard University, USA).

=== The Klaus J. Jacobs Best Practice Award ===
The Klaus J. Jacobs Best Practice Award is given for exceptional engagement by an institution or individual whose practical work makes real use of innovative ideas for the positive development of children and youth. The prize money amounts to 200,000 Swiss Francs which can be used for a project chosen by the recipient.

The award winner of the Best Practice Award is chosen by the board of the Jacobs Foundation.

Year	Research Award Winner	Best Practice Award!
2009	Laurence Steinberg (Temple University)	Father Johann Casutt (ATMI, Surakarta, Indonesia)
2010	Terrie Moffitt (Duke University); Avshalom Caspi (King's College London)	Opstapje, Germany a:primo, Switzerland
2011	Michael Tomasello (Duke University)	Christiane Daepp (Ideenbüro, Switzerland)
2012	Dante Cicchetti (University of Minnesota)	Off Road Kids Foundation, Germany
2013	Greg J. Duncan (University of California, Irvine)	ELTERN-AG, Germany
2014	Michael Meaney (McGill University, Canadian Institute for Advanced Research)	The Serenity Harm Reduction Programme, Zambia
2015	Sarah-Jayne Blakemore (University College London)	Gesamtschule Unterstrass, Zurich
2016	Orazio Attanasio (University College London)	International Child Support-Skilfull Parenting, Kenya
