= Club des Croqueurs de Chocolat =

Association of chocolate specialists

- Formation: 1981; 45 years ago
- Type: Association
- Purpose: Chocolate specialists
- Website: Official website

The Club de Croqueurs de Chocolat (literally: "Chocolate Crunchers' Club") is an association of chocolate specialists. Founded in 1981, it publishes a gastronomic guide dedicated to chocolate every year, and awards prizes at the Salon du Chocolat in Paris.

Among the founders in 1981 were Claude Lebey, food critic, Nicolas de Rabaudy, journalist, Jean-Paul Aron, philosopher, and Philippe Court, director of a champagne house.

The Club has won many awards such as, the flavor and originality award in 2022. They also meet every two months in Paris for tastings and an annual dinner during which the menus are exclusively made up of dark and milk chocolate (candies, bars, desserts).
