= Jacobs (coffee) =

German coffee brand

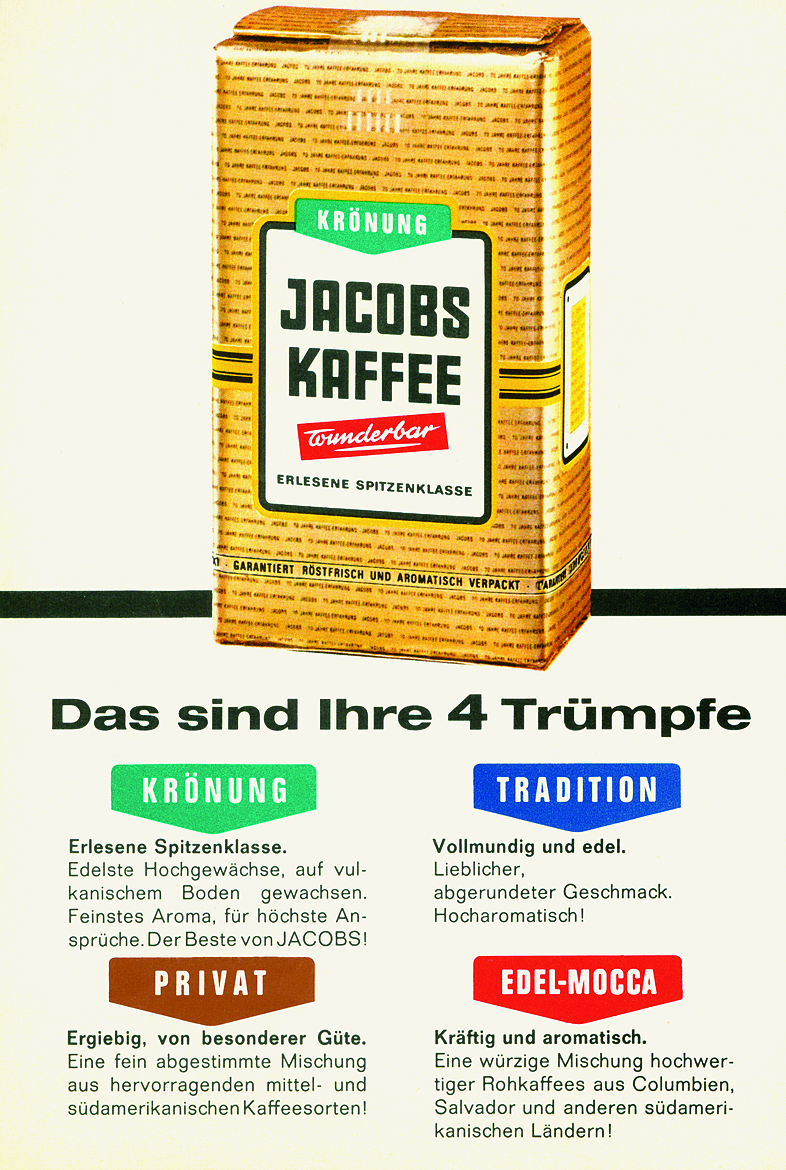
- Jacobs Coffee in 1966
- Headquarters: Germany
- Website: jacobs.de

Jacobs (German pronunciation: [ˈjaːkɔps]) is a brand of coffee that traces its beginnings to 1895 in Germany by Johann Jacobs (1869 in Borgfeld, Bremen – 1958 in Bremen) and is today marketed in Europe by JDE Peet's.

== Major markets ==
Major markets are Austria, the Baltic countries, North Macedonia, Finland, Bulgaria, Croatia, Bosnia and Herzegovina, Serbia, the Czech Republic, Germany, Turkey, Greece, Israel, Hungary, Poland, the Netherlands, Romania, Russia, Slovakia, Azerbaijan, Switzerland, Iran, Tajikistan, Georgia, Armenia, Ukraine, Namibia, South Africa, Tunisia, Morocco, Mexico, The Bahamas, Ireland, Botswana, Zimbabwe and Zambia.

== Managements ==
Under the direction of Klaus Johann Jacobs, who took over the company in 1970, Jacobs expanded into other fields. It merged with the Swiss chocolate company Interfood in 1982 to form Jacobs Suchard, and bought the American Brach's Candy in 1987, among other acquisitions. Jacobs Suchard, with the exception of Brach's and Interfood, was sold to Kraft Foods in 1990. During the 1970s until 1990s it was produced by Jacob's in Ireland.

== Brands ==
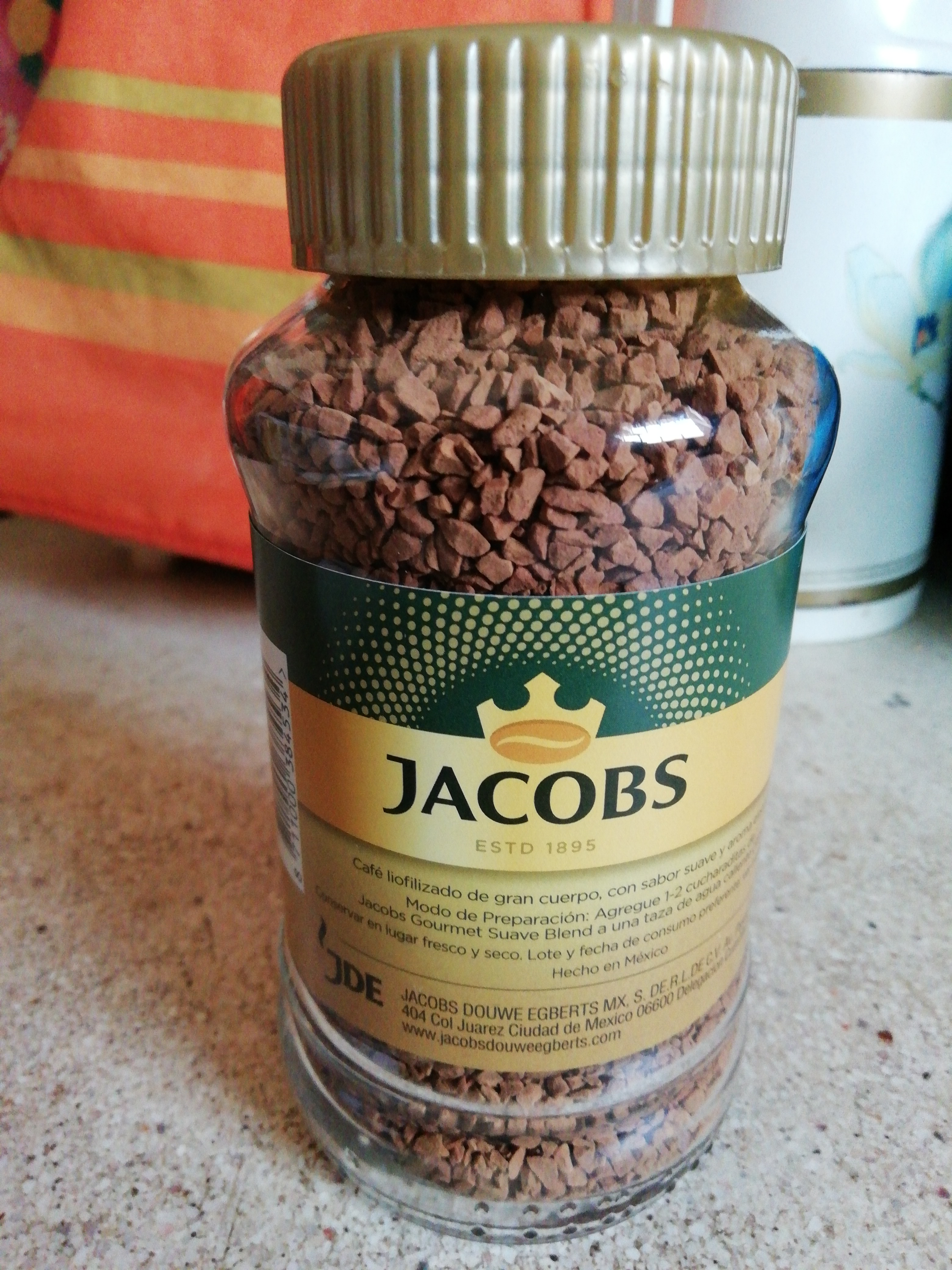
Jacobs coffee in Mexico

- Jacobs Krönung (marketed as Jacobs Monarch in some markets) and available in disks for the Tassimo coffee maker.
- Jacobs Night&Day
- Jacobs Cronat Gold
- Jacobs 3in1
