= Chocolate bar =

Confection

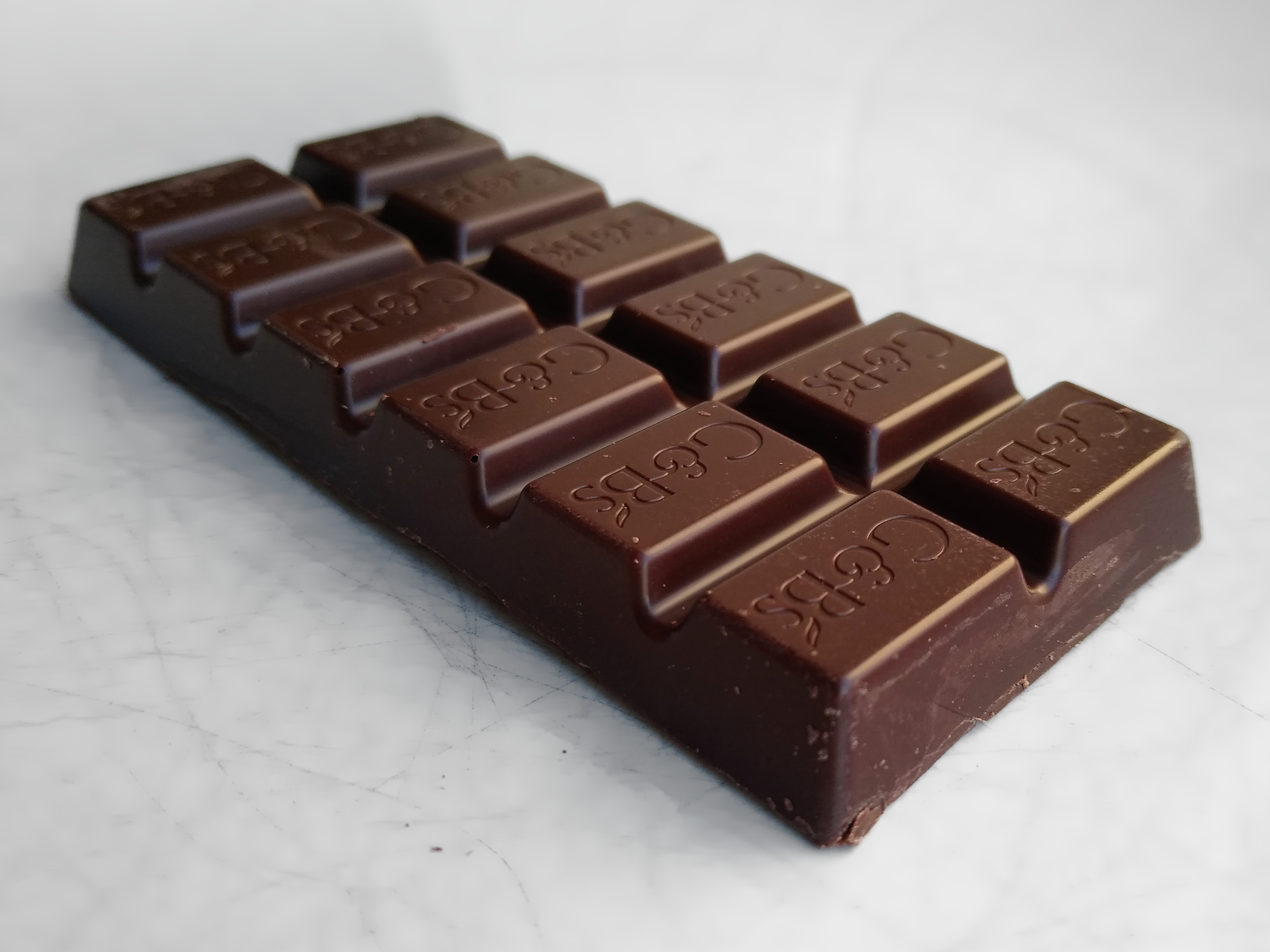
- Dark chocolate bar
- Alternative names: Chocolate tablet
- Type: Confectionery
- Place of origin: Europe (modern confection)
- Main ingredients: Cocoa liquor, cocoa butter, sugar
- Ingredients generally used: Milk, nuts, fruit, caramel, nougat, wafers
- Variations: Types of chocolate

A chocolate bar is a confection containing chocolate, which may also contain layerings or mixtures that include nuts, fruit, caramel, nougat, and wafers. A flat and easily partitionable chocolate bar is also called a tablet. In some varieties of English and food labeling standards, the term chocolate bar is reserved for bars of solid chocolate, with candy bar used for products with additional ingredients.

The manufacture of a chocolate bar from raw cocoa ingredients requires many steps, from grinding and refining, to conching and tempering. While the grinding of cocoa beans is an ancient Mesoamerican practice, the subsequent processes were independently developed by chocolate manufacturers in different European countries. There is therefore no precise moment when the first chocolate bar came into existence. Solid chocolate was already consumed in the 18th century. The 19th century saw the emergence of the modern chocolate industry; most manufacturing techniques used today were invented during this period.

Dark, milk and white are the main three types of chocolate. Ingredients not derived from cocoa have been added to bars since the beginning of the chocolate industry, often to reduce production costs.

== Terminology ==
Terminology in the 1900s

In many varieties of English, chocolate bar refers to any confectionery bar that contains chocolate. In some dialects of American English, only bars of solid chocolate are described as chocolate bars, with the phrase candy bar used as a broader term encompassing bars of solid chocolate, bars combining chocolate with other ingredients, and bars containing no chocolate at all. In Canada, while the term chocolate bar is commonly used for bars combining chocolate with other ingredients, only bars of solid chocolate can be labelled as a chocolate bar.

The term bar may refer to a large variety of shapes, including not oblong ones, such as squares. Small (bite-sized) chocolate pieces are however usually referred to as chocolates, regardless of shape. These include neapolitans, bonbons, pralines and truffles.

Cake chocolate is an old commercial designation for solid chocolate, although referring primarily to plain blocks of chocolate. Early chocolate bars intended for direct consumption were marketed under a variety of names, such as bâtons, cigars, wafers etc, before the term bar became commonplace.

== History ==
=== Early history ===
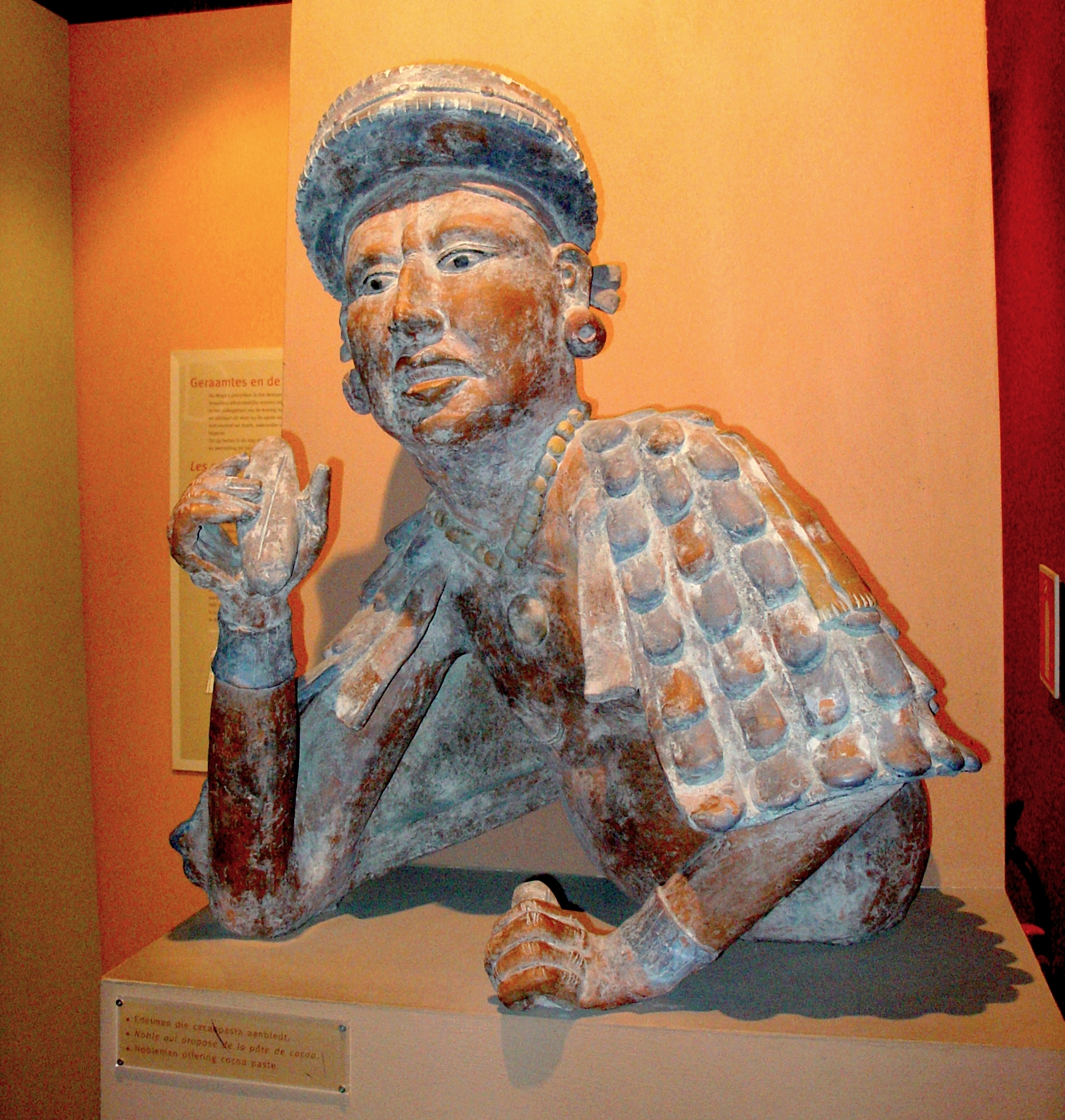
A Mayan holding sticks of ground cocoa paste

Solid chocolate was probably already consumed in pre-Columbian America, in particular by the Aztecs, despite the beverage being the traditional form of consumption of cocoa in Mesoamerica. In fact, any finely ground cocoa that is not immediately used to make a drink turns into solid chocolate. The grinding of the cocoa beans was done with a stone metate. Dominican friar Diego Durán mentions in his writings that Aztec soldiers carried small balls of ground cocoa among other military rations. Cocoa was introduced into Europe in the early 16th century, possibly already under its processed (solid) form.

Until the 18th century, chocolate was essentially consumed as a drink. Transport of cocoa beans was slow and difficult, therefore making the product very expensive in Europe. Chocolate was usually sold as a solidified ground but still grainy cocoa paste (in the form of blocks, sticks or balls) to be dissolved in water or milk, either plain or already sweetened and flavoured. It is unclear when bars or tablets of chocolate (meant to be eaten straight as a candy rather than grated into a drink) were made for the first time. It is known, however, that the consumption of solid chocolate by the wealthy increased by the end of the 18th century, notably in the form of pastilles ("drops") and bâtons ("sticks"). Sweetened preparations more likely to be consumed on their own or used in confectionery included French chocolate, flavored with vanilla, and Spanish chocolate, flavored with cinnamon and cloves. These preparations, often made with equal parts cocoa and sugar, were the precursors of modern chocolate. Cane sugar, another colonial commodity, was widely used in Europe by the 18th century.

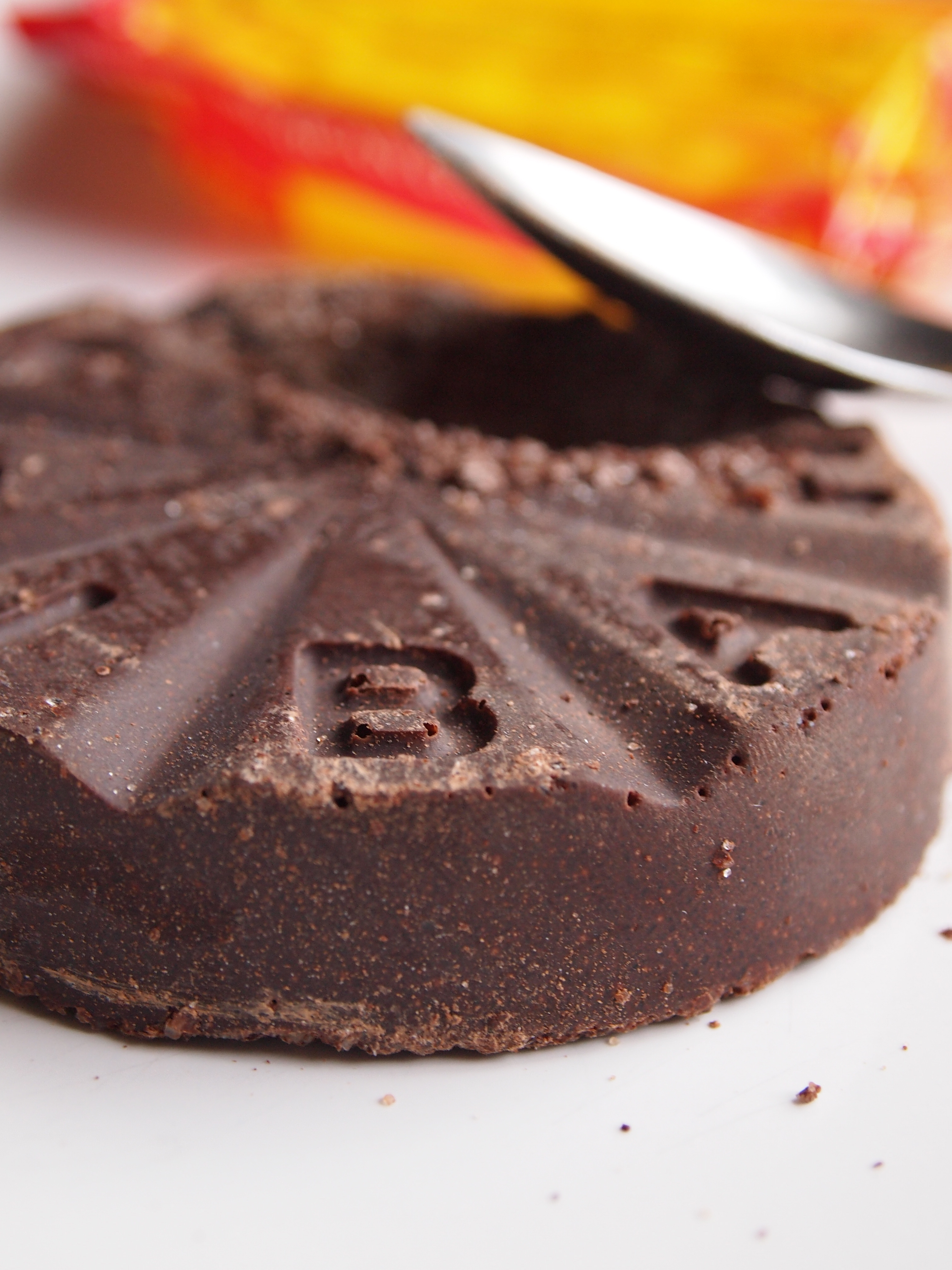
Modern-day Mexican chocolate for drinking

Diablotins (French for "little devils") were among the earliest candies made from solid chocolate. They were produced as early as the 1720s in France and came in various shapes, coated with nonpareils that allowed them to be handled without the chocolate melting from the warmth of the fingers. The name of the confection probably reflected chocolate's controversial reputation in the 18th century. Pistachios have also been paired with chocolate since the 18th century.

An illustration of the popularity of chocolate as a confection is given by the Marquis de Sade who wrote to his wife in a letter dated May 16, 1779, complaining about the quality of a care package he had received while in prison. Among the requests that he made for future deliveries were for cookies that "must smell of chocolate, as if one were biting into a chocolate bar." This phrasing is highly suggestive of the fact that the use of chocolate in both baking and consumption on its own was well-established before the French Revolution. Another suggestive illustration is given by a contemporary encyclopedia, which mentions bonbons, diablotins, and even a form of "white chocolate" consisting of cocoa butter. However, at the time, chocolate was still ground by hand and produced on a small scale. Methods to extract cocoa butter were also inefficient, and cocoa butter was rarely used in chocolate-making.

Up to and including the 19th century and even the early 20th century, confectionery of all sorts was typically sold in small pieces, which were bagged and sold by weight, while larger blocks of chocolate intended for drinking were individually wrapped, usually with paper. Individually wrapped chocolates and candies, in tin foil or vellum paper, had been sold since the 19th century but were hand-wrapped and likely very expensive. Modern chocolate bars, as we know them today, evolved from these earlier forms of candies in the late 19th and early 20th century, offering a more convenient way of packaging and selling confectionery for both buyers and sellers.

=== Industrialisation ===
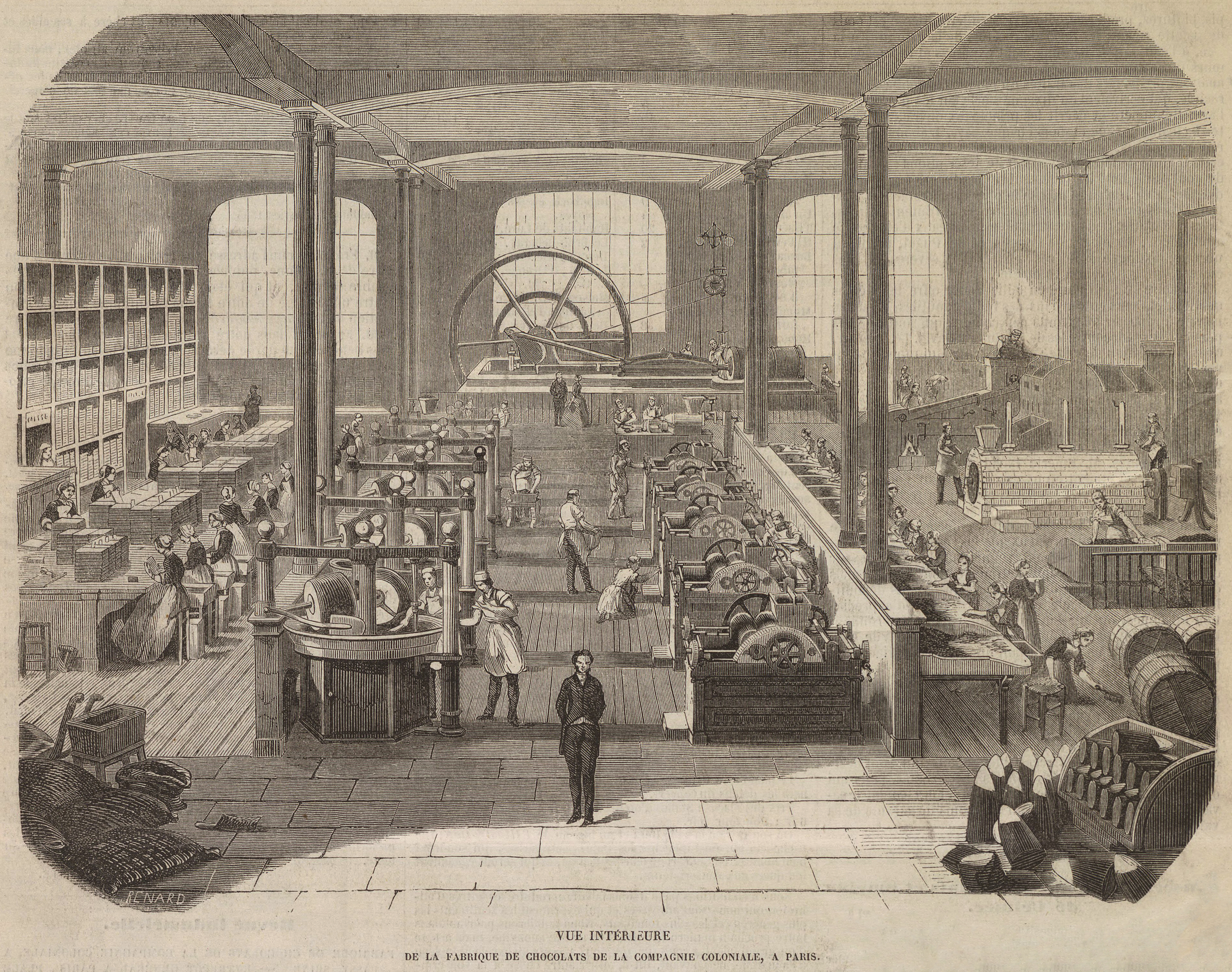
Mid-19th-century French chocolate factory featuring melangers and roller mills

The late 18th century saw the beginning of the mechanization of chocolate manufacturing. Water and wind power was used first, steam-powered machines followed. This not only enabled chocolate to be produced on a larger scale but also improved its quality. Among the pioneers were Joseph Storrs Fry, who patented a method of grinding cocoa beans using a Watt steam engine in 1795, and Poincelet, who invented the melanger in 1811, soon adopted by most chocolate manufacturers. Roller mills, initially consisting of two cylindrical rolls and later incorporating three or more, also began to be used around this time. The combined use of melangers and roller mills enabled the production of sweet chocolate with a more homogeneous texture.

In the early 19th century, several chocolate manufacturers are credited for technical improvements or novelties. François-Louis Cailler, who founded the Cailler factory in 1819 in Switzerland, sold assortments of chocolate tablets. Shortly after, in 1826, another Swiss chocolatier, Philippe Suchard, founded the Suchard factory where he used and developed the melanger. The same year, Pierre Paul Caffarel founded the Caffarel factory in Italy, using a new grinding machine, also allowing him to increase production. During that decade, in England, Fry & Sons introduced chocolate lozenges as a "substitute for food when travelling".

1828 marked a breakthrough for both eating and drinking chocolate: Casparus van Houten patented an effective method for pressing the fat from roasted cocoa beans. The centre of the bean, known as the "nib", contains an average of 54 percent cocoa butter. Van Houten's machine – the hydraulic cocoa press – reduced the cocoa butter content by nearly half. This not only allowed the creation of defatted cocoa powder (to be used for chocolate drinks), but also the creation of pure cocoa butter on a large scale. The additional cocoa butter (mixed with cocoa liquor and sugar) would allow the production of chocolate with a higher fluidity, therefore with a higher moldability into more complex shapes. It is not known when the first chocolate with added cocoa butter was manufactured. However, in 1832, the first workshop for producing chocolate moulds opened in Paris, testifying to the increasing use of chocolate in confectionery, especially in France.

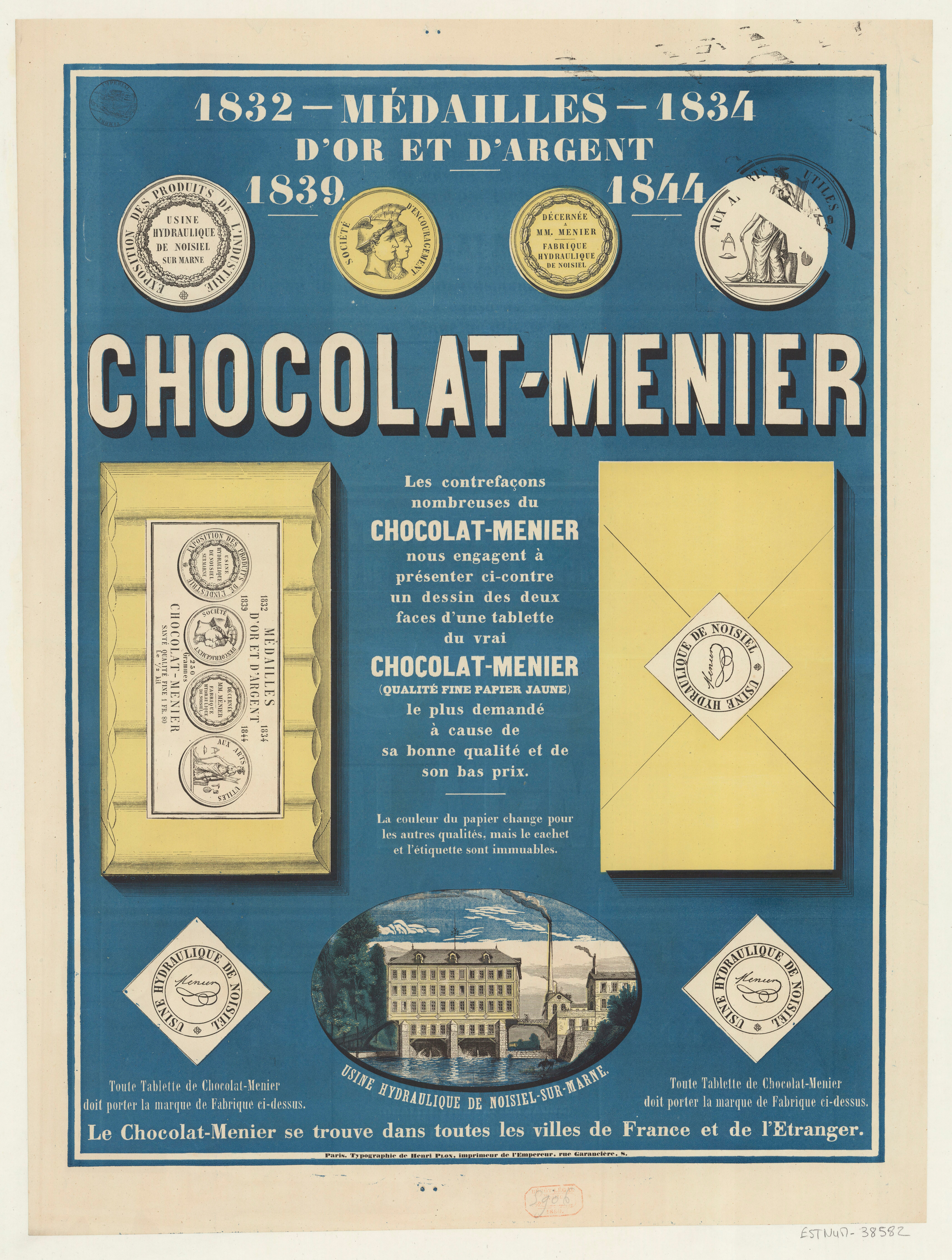
The Menier chocolate tablet (1860 poster)

An American magazine reported in 1836 that small, sweetened chocolate bars were gaining popularity in France for their nutritional value and convenience. At the time, chocolate was still typically manufactured without sugar in Great Britain and the United States, while sweetened chocolate had already become established in continental Europe. There, the industry also benefited from the introduction of domestically produced beet sugar, which eventually supplanted cane sugar in European confections.

In the 1830s, French pharmacist Antoine Brutus Menier, who first used chocolate as a coating for pills, developed a chocolate factory in Noisiel. In 1836, a yellow-wrapped chocolate tablet with six semi-cylindrical divisions is launched. By the 1840s the production of a wide variety of chocolate bars and bonbons is attested, possibly already using additional cocoa butter. Semi-finished products like finely ground cocoa liquor and cocoa butter were also sold by Menier. Menier's tablets bore a trademark to protect them from counterfeits. By the 1860s, production reached 2,500 tonnes, a quarter of the country’s total output, much of it exported.

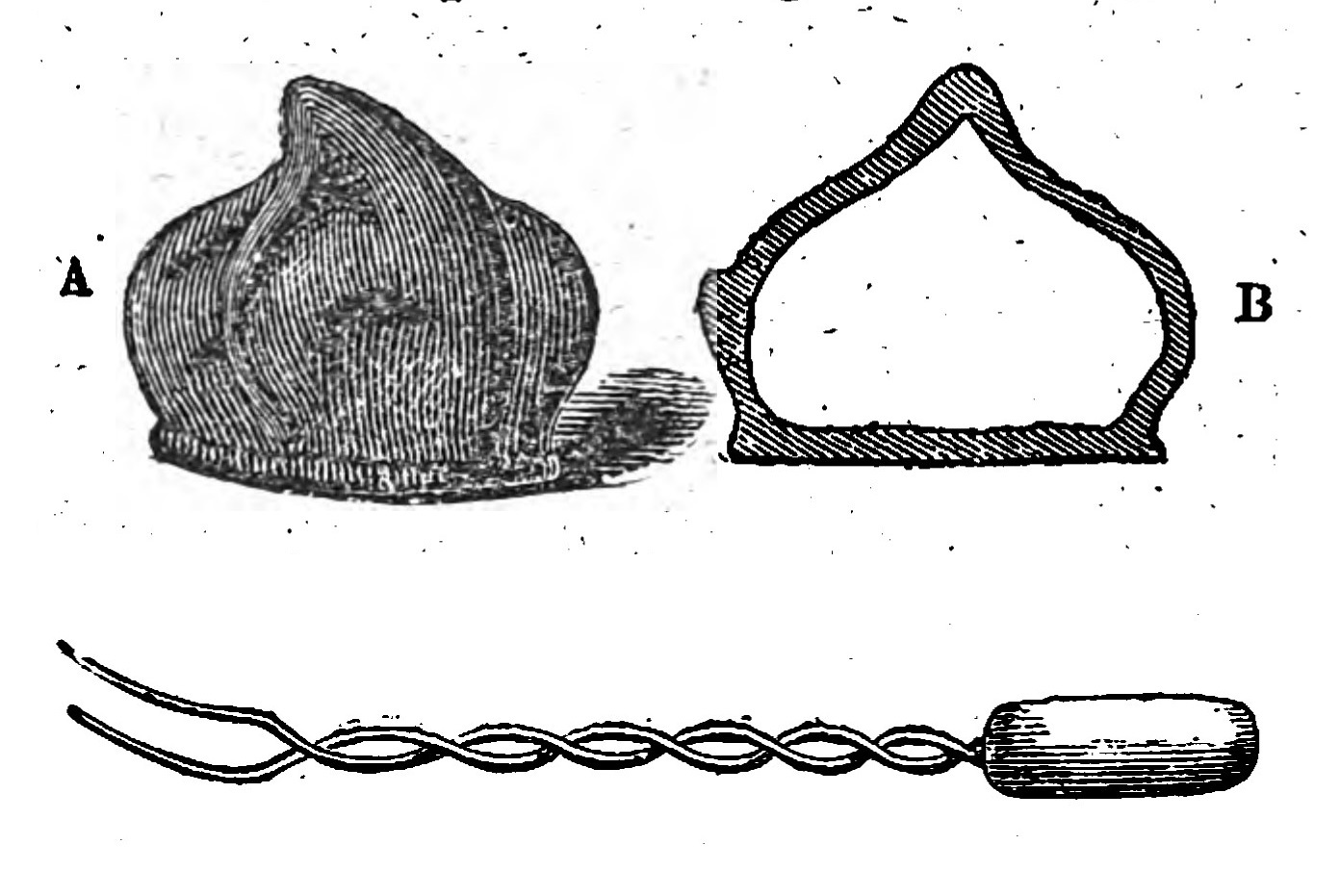
The making of a chocolate cream with couverture in the 1850s

French chocolate was commonly moulded into 125- and 250-gram tablets, as well as into smaller bâtons and disk-shaped croquettes, the latter intended for individual consumption and individually wrapped. Pralines and creams were among the most popular chocolate confections. Couverture chocolate was also used to coat confections by the 1850s. French assortments remained dominant in the confectionery market until milk chocolate emerged in the 1890s.

While almonds had long been established in European confectionery, notably in the form of praline and nougat, hazelnuts also began to be used in chocolate-making by the mid-nineteenth century, particularly in Italy and subsequently in Switzerland. Both Caffarel and Kohler are credited with contributing to the introduction of hazelnut chocolate. Gianduja, first developed in Turin and made with regionally grown hazelnuts, even emerged as a distinctive type of chocolate before the invention of milk chocolate and became particularly popular throughout Europe.

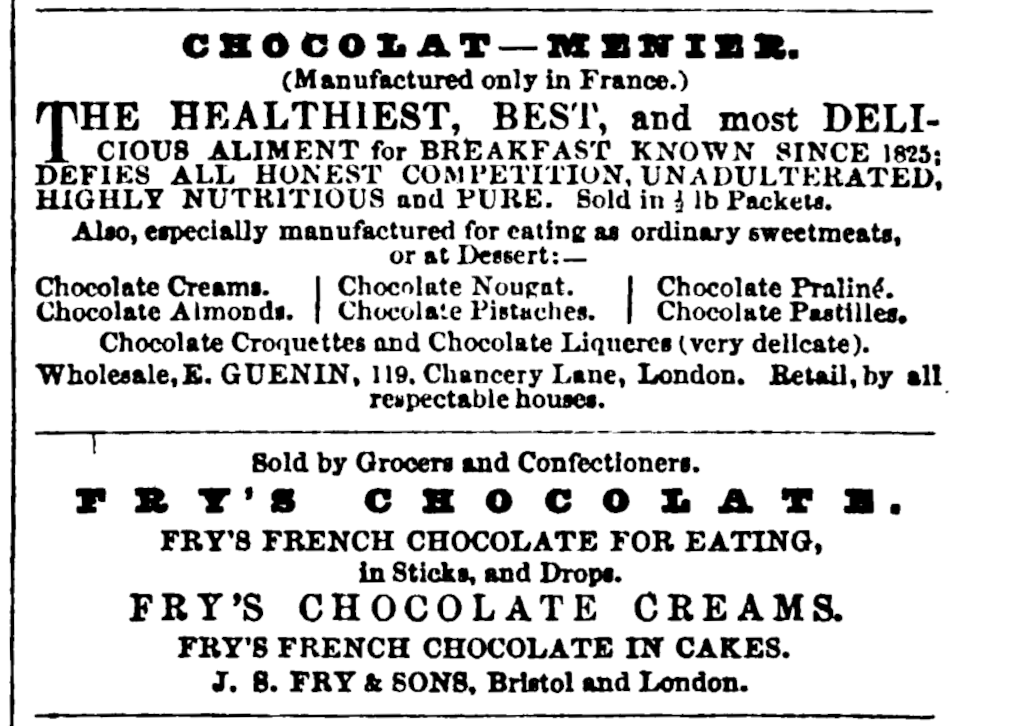
Menier and Fry's ads (1864)

In the 1840s, British manufacturers adopted eating chocolate to counter the popularity of French imports. In 1842, John Cadbury sold "French Eating Chocolate". He was followed by Joseph Fry who sold Chocolat Délicieux à Manger ("delicious eating chocolate") in 1847. The latter, which was probably made with additional cocoa butter, has been described as the first solid chocolate bar in Britain, although it was not successful. In 1849, both Fry and Cadbury chocolates were displayed publicly at a trade fair in Bingley Hall, Birmingham. Meanwhile, the Walter Baker company introduced sweetened chocolate bars during the California gold rush, popularising chocolate as an everyday food in the United States.

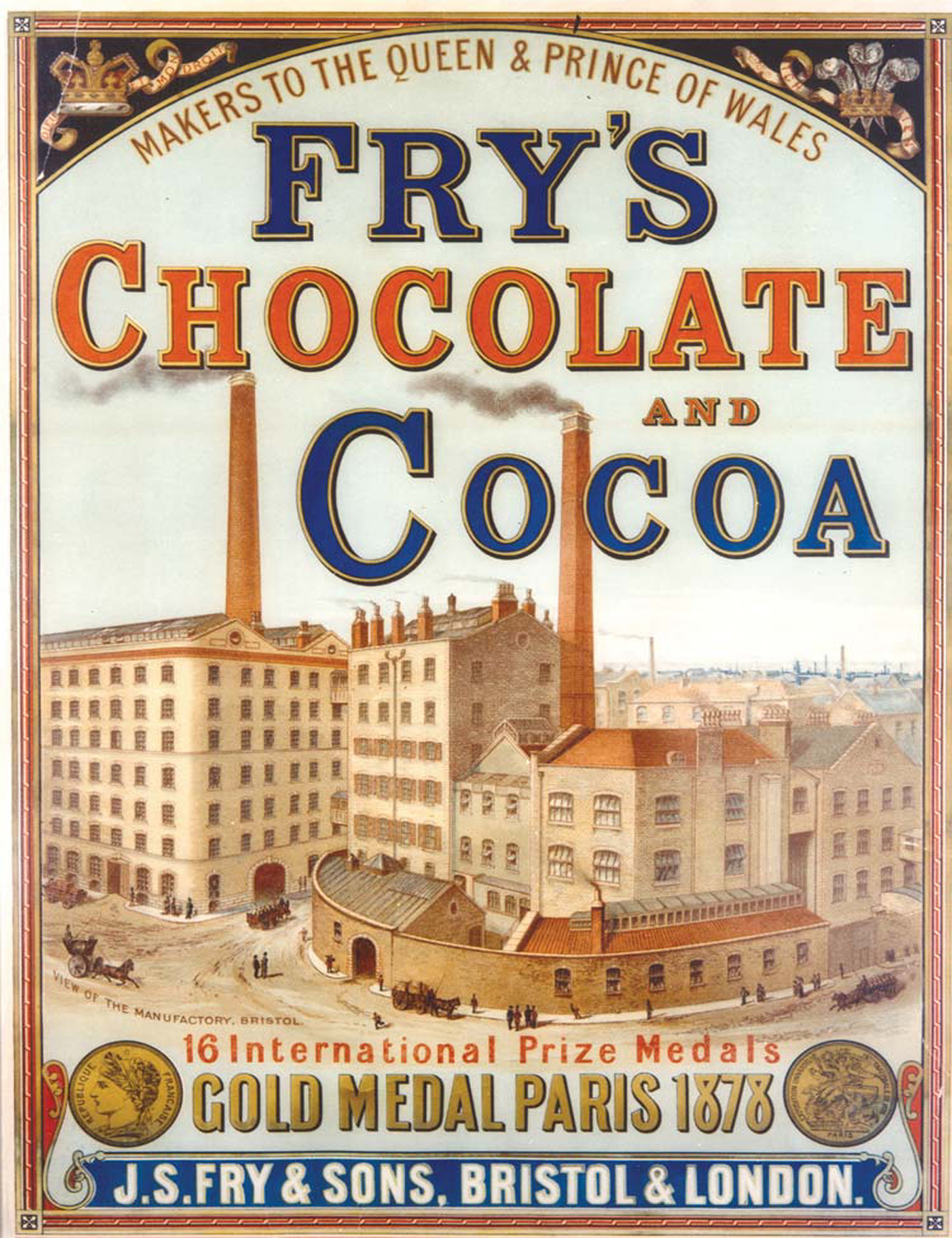
Fry and Sons Manufactory in the late 19th century

Fry's chocolate factory in Bristol, J. S. Fry & Sons, began the mass-production of various chocolate candies, notably Fry's Cream Sticks released in 1853, which led to the Fry's Chocolate Cream bar in 1866. The production of eating chocolate rose from about 10 tonnes in 1852 to over 1,100 tonnes in 1880; a Van Houten press was acquired and installed in 1868, two years after its competitor, Cadbury, installed his. Novelties included the first chocolate Easter egg in the UK in 1873. In addition to Cadbury and Fry, Rowntree's and Terry's were major British chocolate companies, as chocolate manufacturing expanded in England throughout the rest of the century.

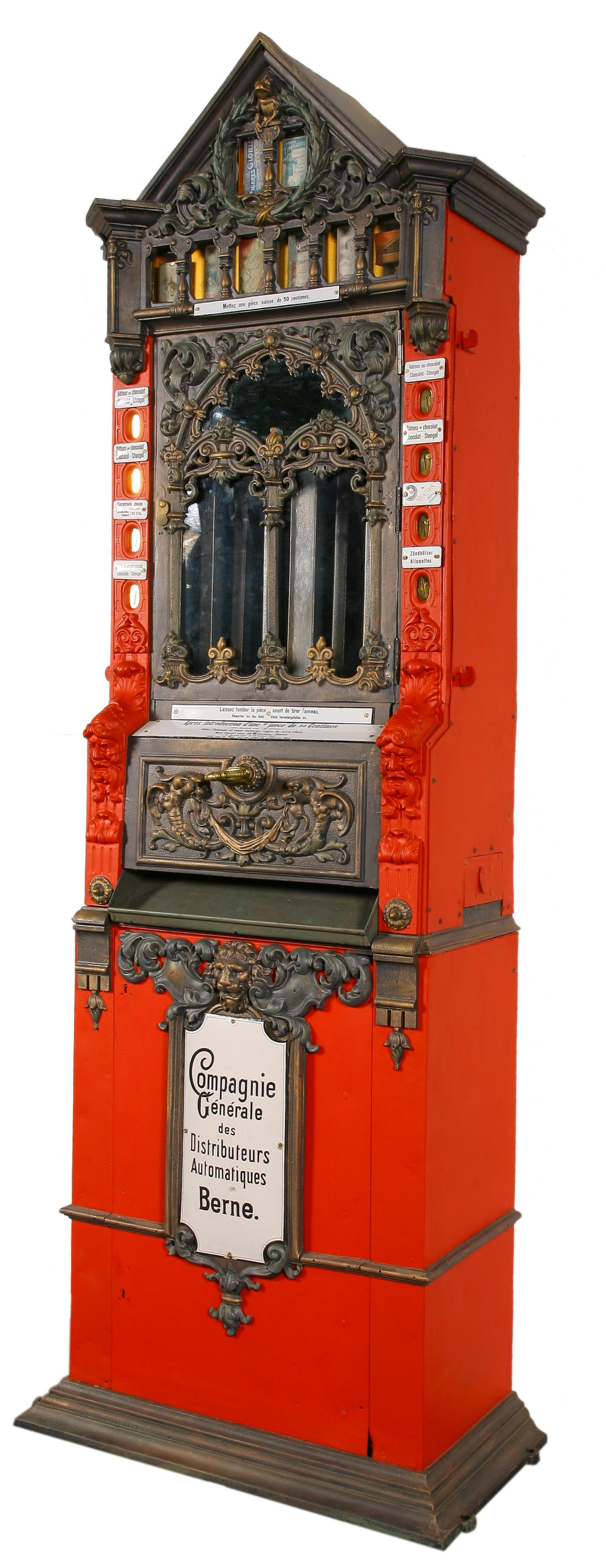
Chocolate vending machine (1895)

In 1860, the German confectionery company Stollwerck began producing chocolate. It became one of the largest chocolate manufacturers, perhaps offering the widest assortment of chocolate products in the 1880s. In 1887, the company installed its first chocolate vending machines. By 1890, 18 million chocolate bars had been sold through vending machines alone. The vending-machine network also extended to the United States. In the 1890s, North American companies such as Ganong Bros. and Lowney's also manufactured and sold assortments of chocolates. The Chicago World’s Fair of 1893, which showcased chocolate manufacturers and chocolate-making equipment, would further encourage the adoption of chocolate in confectionery across North America.

By the end of the century, European chocolate makers such as Menier, Fry’s, Suchard, and Stollwerck had already expanded well beyond their domestic markets, developing extensive export and distribution networks. Mechanised production and improvements in transport enabled these firms to reach increasingly international markets, while some also established factories abroad, including Menier in England (1870) and the United States (1891), Suchard in Germany (1879), and, later, Stollwerck in Austria-Hungary (1896).

=== Modern era ===
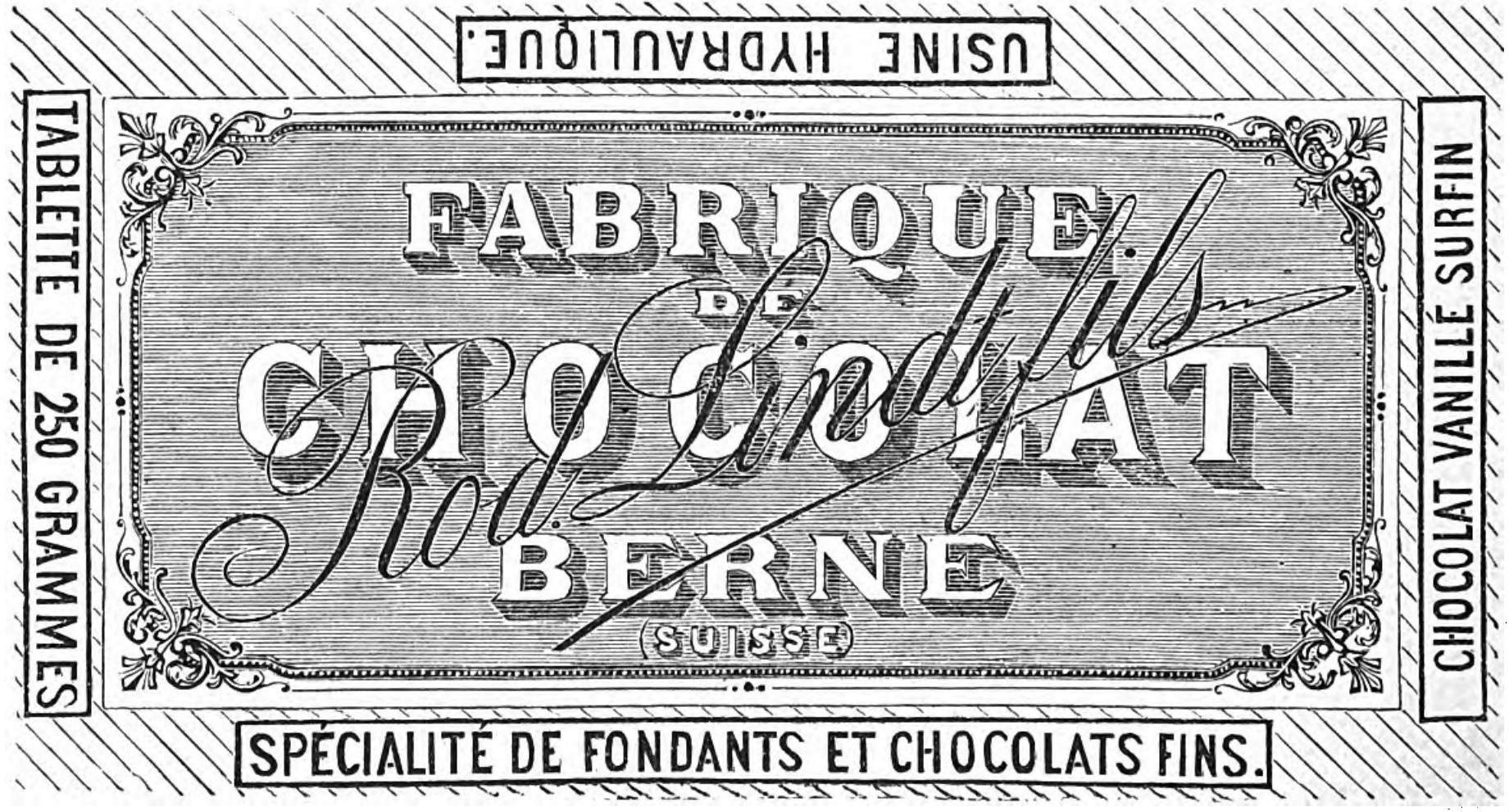
Ad for Lindt (1880s)

Rodolphe Lindt, a Swiss confectioner from Berne, discovered the conching process in 1879. Conching evenly blends cocoa butter with cocoa solids and sugar, therefore making the chocolate perfectly smooth. This chocolate, made with additional cocoa butter and moulded into thin tablets, became known as chocolat fondant ("melting chocolate"). At first a trade secret, it became a standard process in the chocolate industry by the 1920s. The last stage of chocolate manufacturing, tempering, was also developed at around this time. Tempering allows the production of chocolate that is hard and stable at room temperature and that has an attractive shiny appearance.

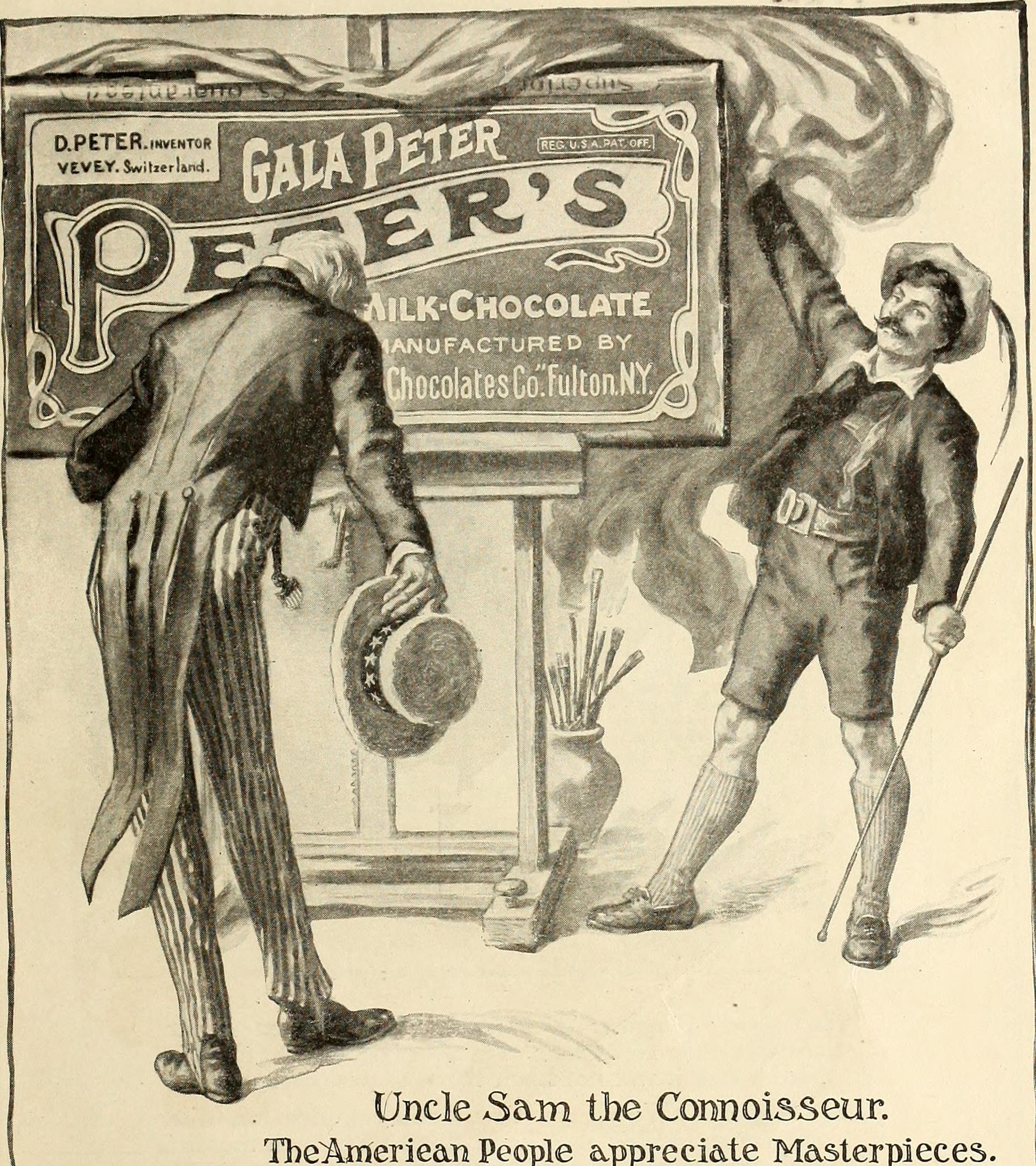
Ad for Gala Peter in the early 20th century

A few years earlier, in 1875, milk chocolate makes its appearance. It was developed by another Swiss confectioner, Daniel Peter. He was able to make milk chocolate with the help of his neighbour Henri Nestlé in Vevey, who was specialized in dehydrated milk products. Daniel Peter launched his successful Gala Peter brand in 1887. Cailler and Suchard (Milka) followed in the late 19th century, while other factories opened during this period also benefiting from the development of conching, notably Frey and Tobler. Confectionery chocolate production increased rapidly, and Swiss chocolate came to dominate the chocolate market.

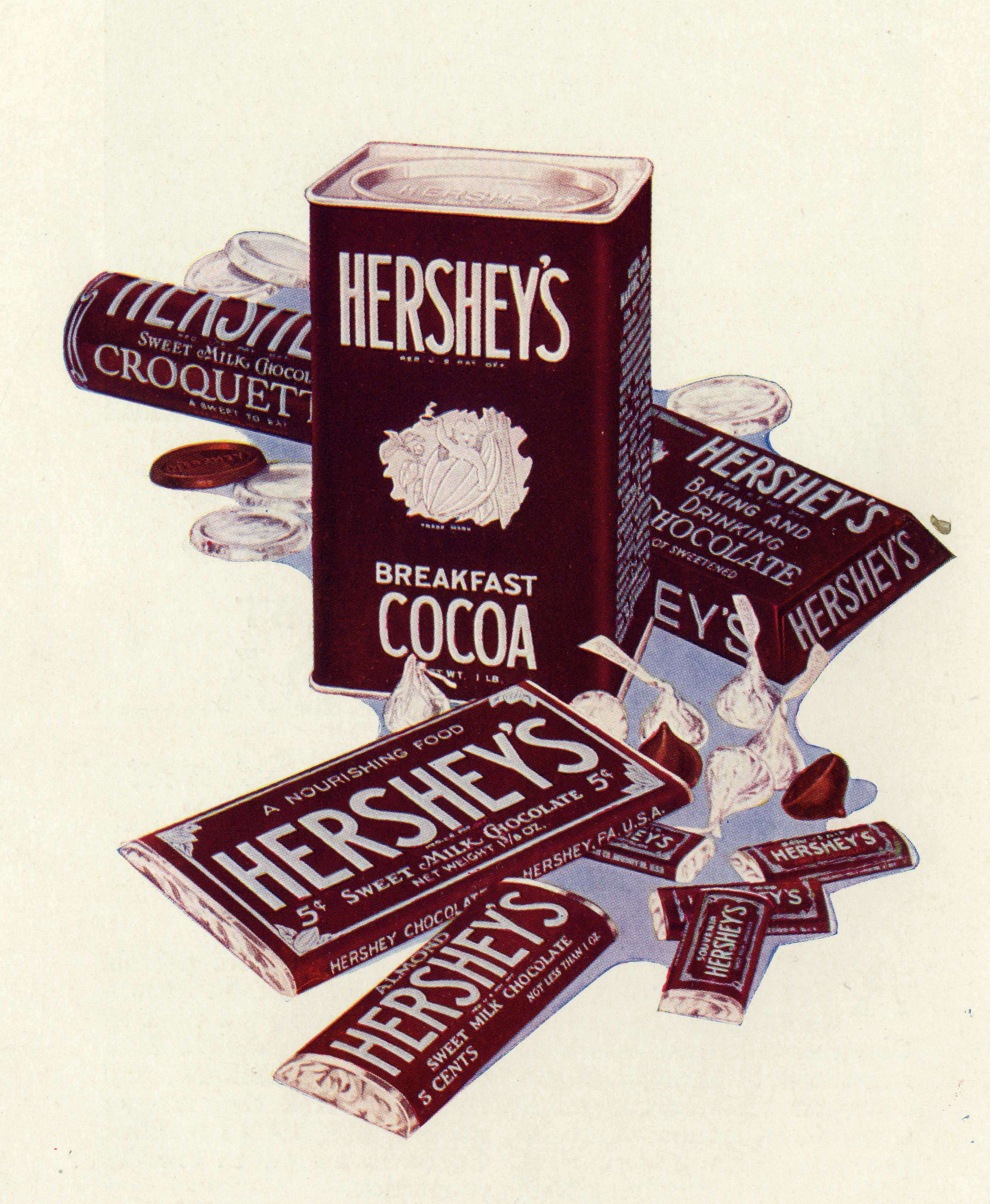
Hershey's croquettes, bars and neapolitans in the 1920s

In 1897, following the lead of Swiss companies, Cadbury introduced its own line of milk chocolate bars in the UK. Cadbury Dairy Milk, first produced in 1905, became the company's best selling bar. In the United States, immigrants who arrived with candy-making skills drove the development of new chocolate bars. Milton S. Hershey, a Pennsylvania caramel maker, saw a German-manufactured chocolate-making machine at the 1893 World's Fair. He immediately ordered one for his Lancaster factory and produced the first American-made milk chocolate bar.

Until the 20th century, chocolate confections (other than plain bars) were made by hand. In the early 1900s, the first automated enrobing lines began to be introduced. The development of moulded and filled chocolates, as distinct from simply enrobed chocolates, is attributed to Jean Neuhaus (1912) and Jules Séchaud (1913), respectively Belgian and Swiss. Neuhaus is generally regarded as the inventor of the modern praline, while Séchaud is credited with inventing the machinery used to fill chocolates and launching the first filled chocolate bar.

Chocolate bar sales grew rapidly in the early-20th century. During World War I, the U.S. Army commissioned a number of American chocolate makers to produce 40 pound blocks of chocolate. These were shipped to Army quartermaster bases and distributed to the troops stationed throughout Europe. When the soldiers returned home, their demand for chocolate contributed to the increasing popularity of the chocolate bar. Chocolate manufacturing techniques had also spread to Japan by 1918. During the 20th century, many chocolate manufacturers merged into larger corporations and multinational companies. White chocolate was introduced in 1936 by Nestlé, while ruby chocolate was introduced in 2017 by Barry Callebaut.

=== Bean-to-bar movement ===
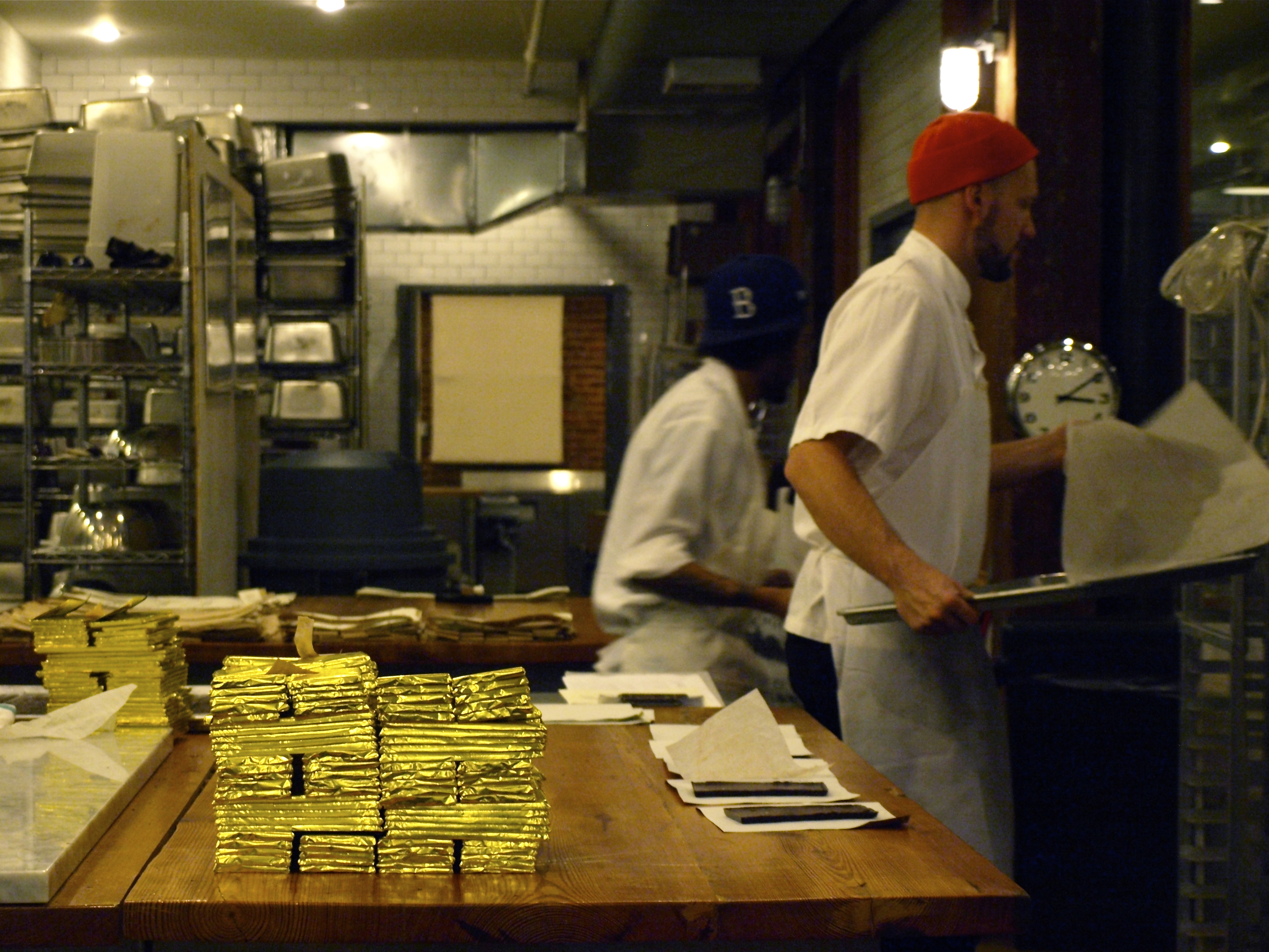
Craft chocolate making in the United States (2010s)

A craft chocolate movement emerged in the 1970s and 1980s but surged significantly in the 2000s and 2010s. Pioneer makers sought to reclaim chocolate as a pure, unprocessed food by returning to traditional manufacturing, often using vintage chocolate making equipment. Craft chocolate makers began focusing on the unique flavor profiles of different cocoa varieties rather than blending them to achieve a consistent flavor. They also established direct-trade relationships to ensure farmers received equitable compensation. By 2010, the term "bean-to-bar" had been widely adopted to distinguish small-batch artisans from mass-market chocolate manufacturers.

== Ingredients ==
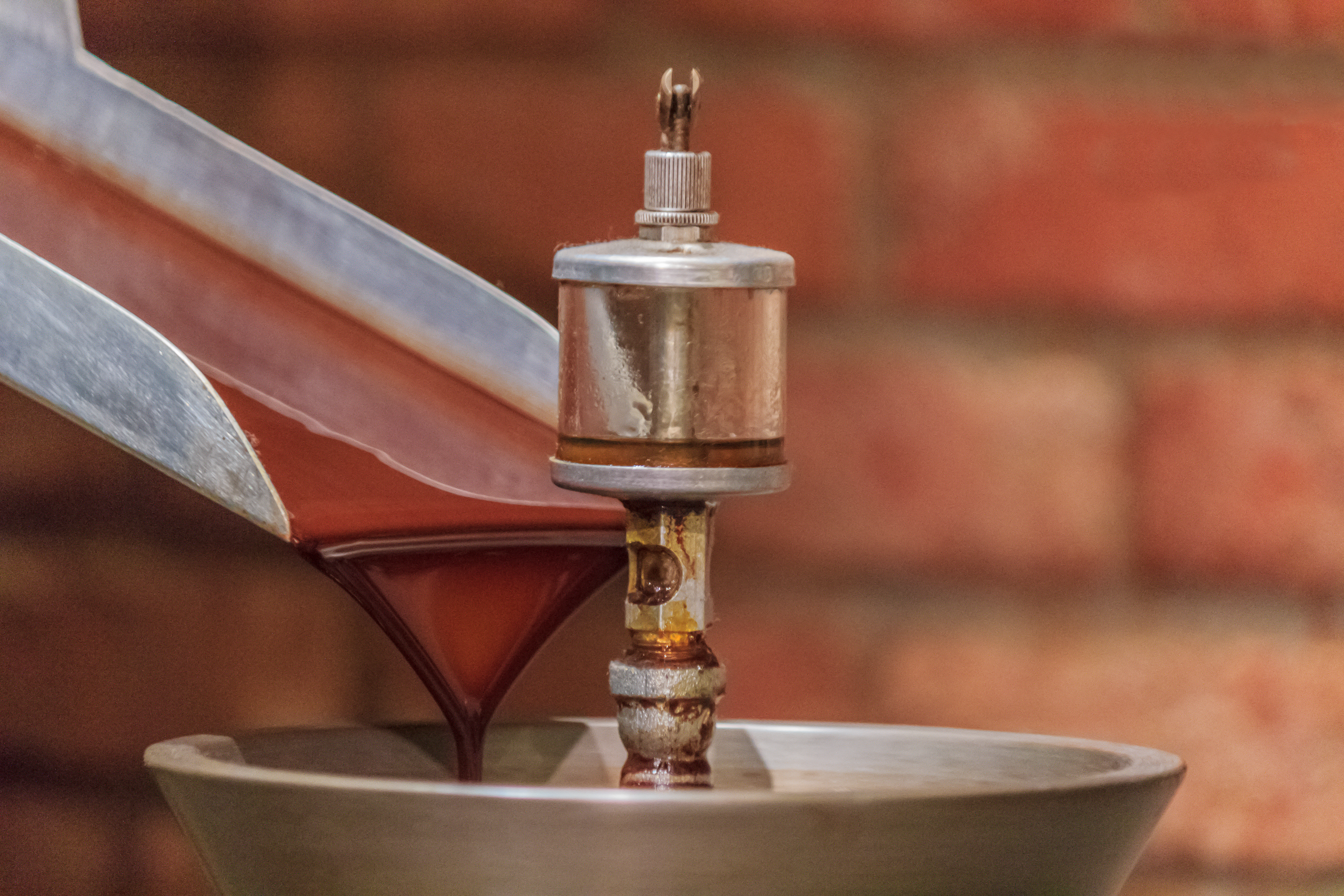
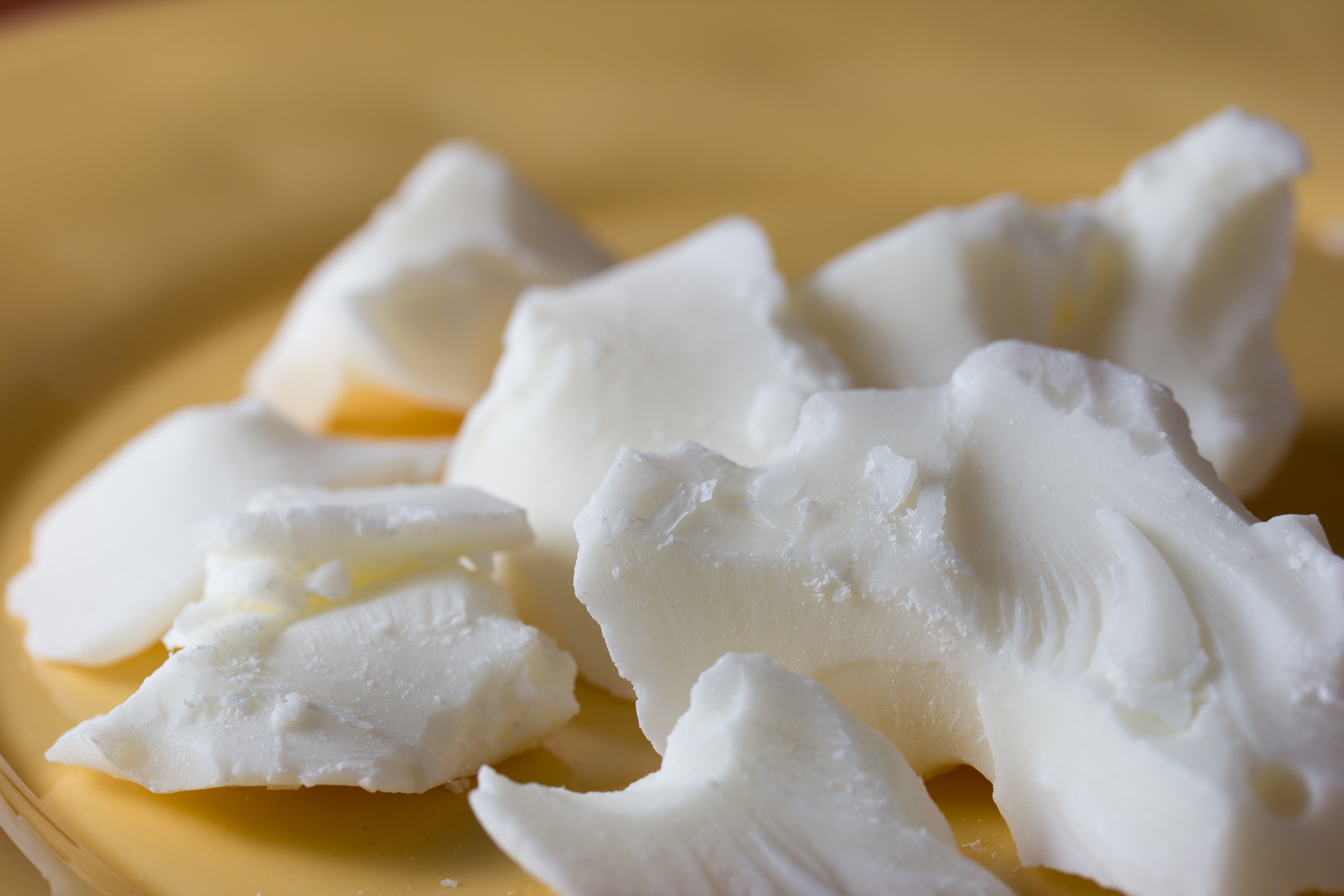
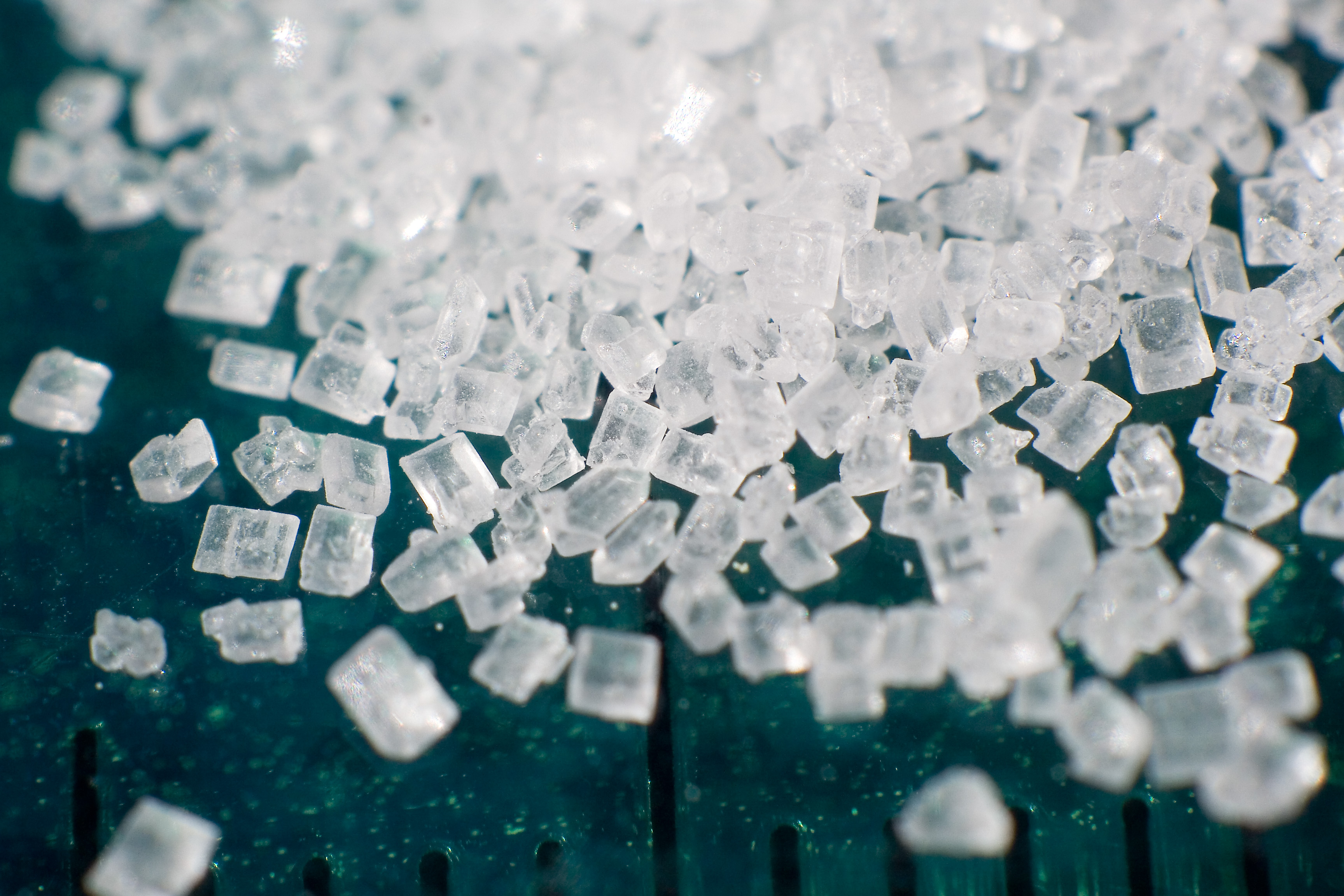
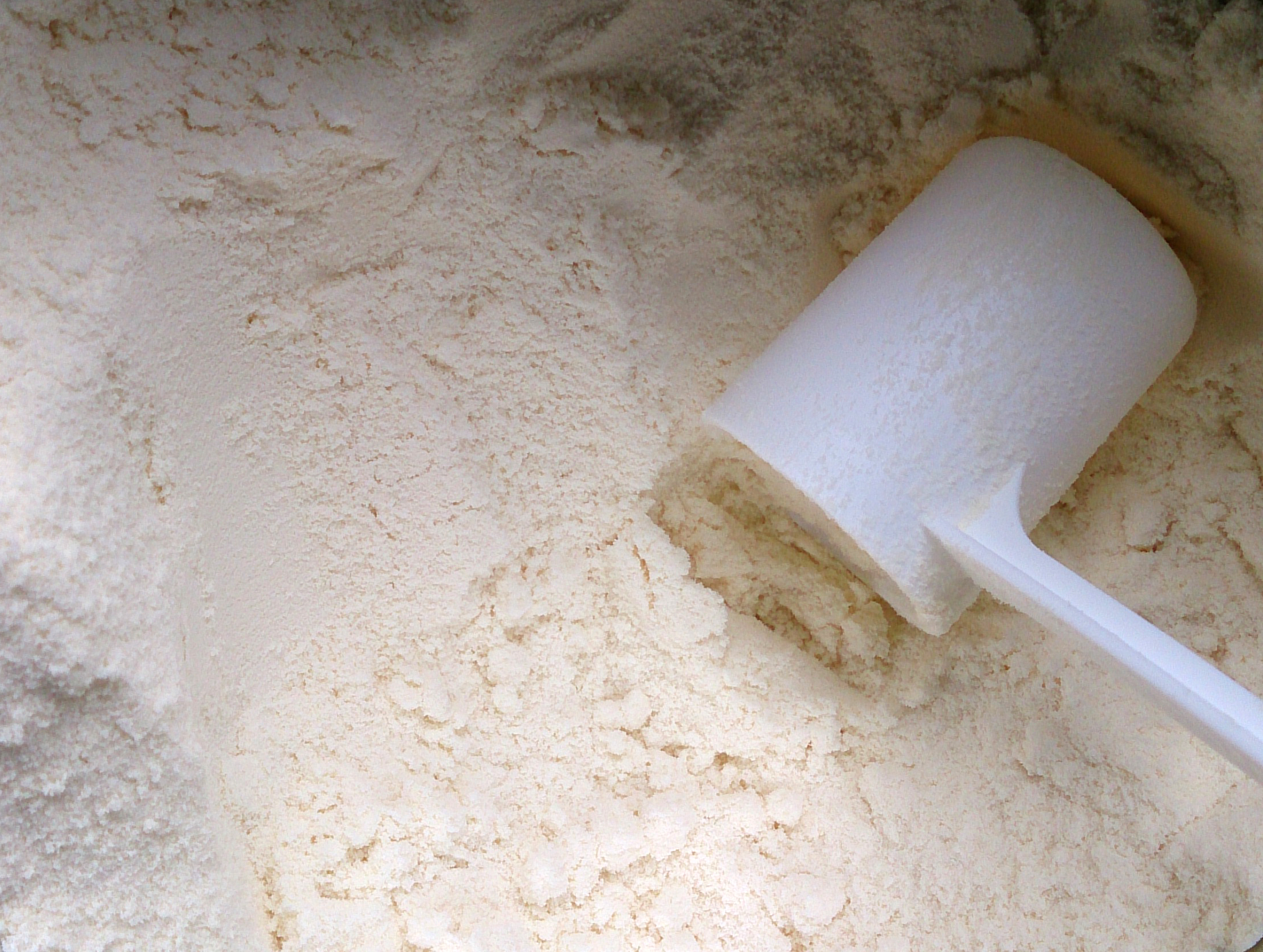
Main chocolate ingredients: cocoa liquor, cocoa butter, sugar, and dried milk.

A solid chocolate bar is typically made with some or all of the following ingredients: cocoa liquor, cocoa butter, sugar, and milk. The relative presence or absence of these define the subclasses of chocolate bar made of dark chocolate, milk chocolate, and white chocolate. In addition to these main ingredients a solid chocolate bar may contain flavorings such as vanilla and emulsifiers such as soy lecithin to alter its consistency. Some chocolate bars contain added milk fat, to make the chocolate softer, since milk fat is a softer fat than cocoa butter. While sugar is commonly used as a sweetener for chocolate bars, some chocolate bars use sugar alcohols, such as maltitol as an alternative.

Compound chocolate, which uses vegetable oils in place of cocoa butter, may be used as a less expensive alternative to true chocolate, though such a product may not be able to be labelled as "chocolate". Combination bars may contain a wide variety of additional ingredients.

=== Combination bars ===
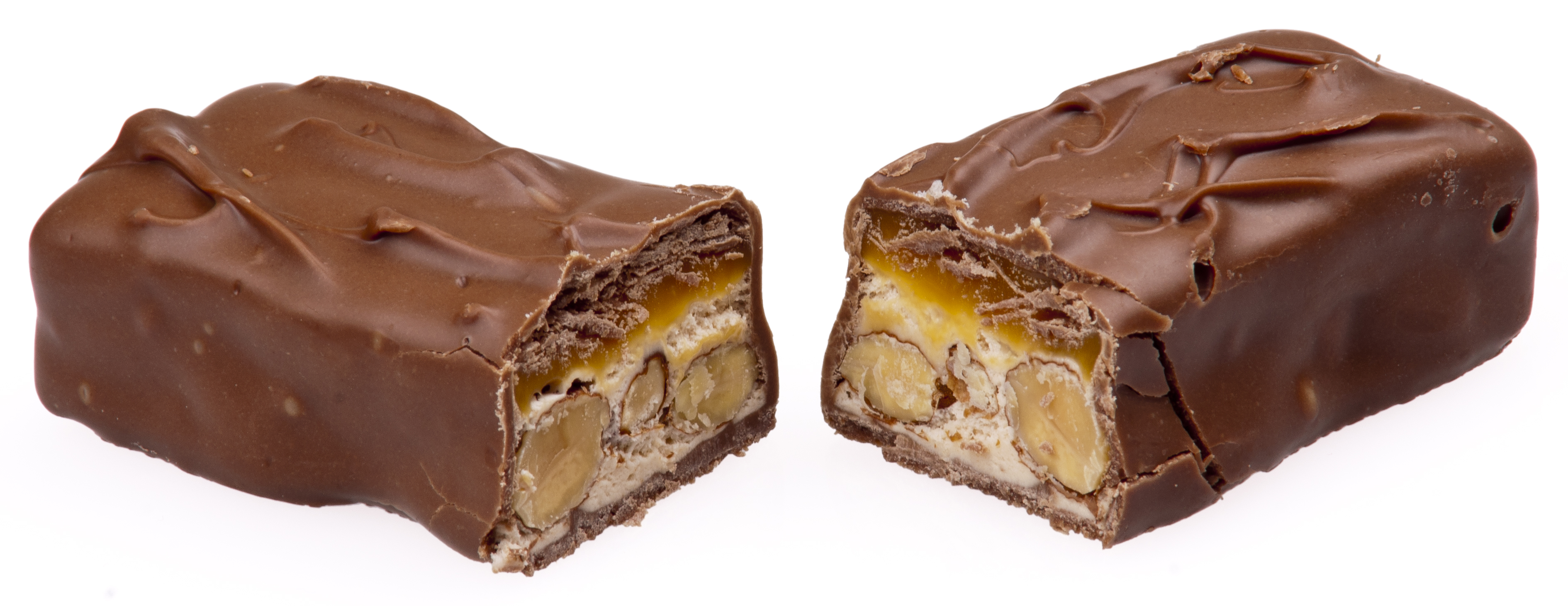
A UK-exclusive Mars Almond bar, cut in half

Popular ingredients and confections such as nuts, dried fruit, caramel, whipped nougat, crisped rice, and wafers are commonly combined with chocolate, which may be moulded into bars or used as a coating. Adding other, usually cheaper, ingredients to chocolate bars can help reduce production costs. Additionally, the overwhelming majority of combination bars use milk chocolate, which further decreases the amount of cocoa in the finished product. Conversely, chocolate also helps protect sensitive confections from exposure to the surrounding air. By the 1920s, approximately 30,000 varieties of candy bars already existed in the United States, most of which were produced locally.

Regional favorites and specialties notably include hazelnuts in Europe, creams in Britain, peanuts in North America, and, more recently, pistachios in the Middle East. Nuts may be incorporated either whole or in the form of pastes, such as gianduja, praline, nougat, peanut butter, marzipan etc. Fillings can be associated with wafers or other biscuits.

Below is a list of pioneering chocolate bar brands in chronological order:

- The Fry's Chocolate Cream, produced by J. S. Fry & Sons, consists of a plain fondant centre enrobed in plain chocolate. Chocolate creams were initially made by hand by female employees. They consisted of a sugar fondant centre shaped in starch moulds and subsequently coated in chocolate. The bar has been produced in its modern form since the early 20th century.
- The Branche, created by Kohler and produced by Cailler since 1904, is a cylindrical and branch-looking chocolate bar, consisting of a hazelnut praline centre coated in milk chocolate and hazelnut splinters. The bar is partly made with recycled broken confectionery. As a consequence of its wide success, "branche" has become a generic term (in French) for any stick-like chocolate bar.
- The Toblerone, produced by Tobler since 1908, is a combination of milk chocolate and torrone, a white nougat made of honey, almonds and egg whites. Its manufacture and distinctive triangular shape was patented at the Swiss Federal Institute of Intellectual Property.
- The Goo Goo Cluster, produced by the Standard Candy Company of Nashville, Tennessee, in 1912, was the first combination bar in the United States. It was made of caramel, marshmallow, and peanuts, covered with milk chocolate. The chocolates were initially sold unwrapped in glass display jars.
- The Mishka Kosolapy, produced at the Krasny Oktyabr factory in Moscow, consists of wafers and almond praline coated in dark chocolate. It was introduced in its current form in 1913. Its wrapper features Ivan Shishkin's Morning in a Pine Forest, depicting Mishka Kosolapy, the clumsy bear of Russian folklore. Earlier uncoated chocolate wafers have also been made by Austrian confectioner Manner since 1898.
- The Clark Bar, a crispy core with caramel and peanut butter covered with milk chocolate, was the first nationally marketed combination bar in the United States.
- The Oh Henry! bar was created by George Williamson of Williamson Candy Co. and named after an electrician who visited his store and flirted with the female candy makers. Williamson launched an advertising campaign that included newspaper ads, streetcar signs, and billboards. The Oh Henry! bar became one of the top-selling brands in the United States in the 1920s. In 1926, the company published a book, 60 New Ways to Serve a Famous Candy, that included recipes for salads, side dishes, and sweet breads, in addition to desserts.
- The Baby Ruth was developed by Otto Schnering, owner of the Curtiss Candy Co., by modifying their original candy bar, Kandy Kake, to compete with the Oh Henry! bar. Schnering claimed that the Baby Ruth was named in honor of President Grover Cleveland's daughter, who died at age 12, but some historians suggest that Schnering chose the name to take advantage of the popularity of Babe Ruth without having to pay royalties. Schnering decided to sell his bar for half the price of its competitor, hiring legendary Chicago ad man, Eddy S. Brandt, to market the Baby Ruth under the slogan "Everything you want for a nickel." The catchy slogan, along with other innovative marketing tactics, like sponsoring circuses and dropping Baby Ruth bars over cities from airplanes, made Baby Ruth the most popular candy bar in the U.S by 1925.
- The Mars bar was introduced by Mars, Incorporated in 1932 in Slough, England, by Forrest Mars, Sr. It consists of caramel and nougat coated with milk chocolate. The Mars bar's chocolate coating features a distinctive signature ripple.
- The Kit Kat bar, created by Rowntree's in 1935, is a milk chocolate-covered wafer bar. The bar consists of two or four fingers that can be snapped from the bar separately. Kit Kat bars are reputed for being made in many different flavours.
- Dubai chocolate, created in 2021 in the United Arab Emirates by Fix Dessert Chocolatier, is a milk chocolate bar filled with a pistachio-tahini cream and kadayif. The recipe went viral on social media in 2024 and has since been imitated by chocolate manufacturers worldwide, triggering pistachio shortages.

== Health and nutrition ==
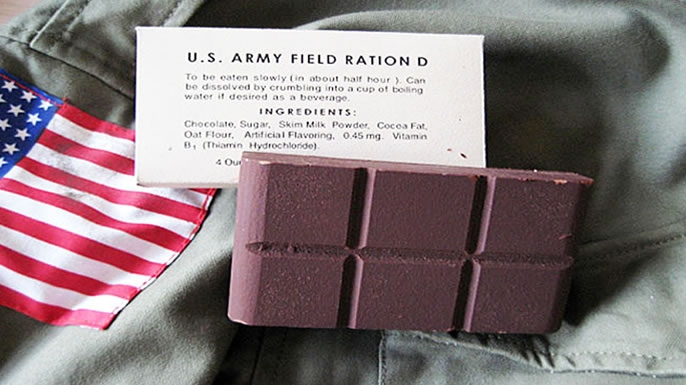
Military chocolate. Due to their high calorie content and long shelf life, chocolate bars are often used in emergency rations.

Chocolate bars vary significantly in nutritional content, typically offering between 200–300 calories per 40 g serving, with high amounts of sugar and fat. A standard milk chocolate bar can contain over 20 g of sugar, while dark chocolate bars generally contain less sugar and more cocoa solids. Excessive consumption has been linked to obesity, tooth decay, and related health conditions.

Dark chocolate, in moderation, has been studied for potential benefits due to its flavonoid content, which may support cardiovascular health and provide antioxidant effects. Modern consumer demand has also led to the development of healthier alternatives such as reduced-sugar bars, vegan options, and protein-fortified chocolate bars.

Recent reviews and trials show that cocoa (especially high-flavonoid, dark‐chocolate formulations) may benefit cardiovascular health by reducing blood pressure, improving insulin sensitivity, enhancing endothelial function, and reducing LDL oxidation and inflammation.

Additionally, a wide selection of chocolate snacks or nutritional supplements are produced with added sources of protein and vitamins, including energy bars, protein bars and granola bars.

== Production ==
=== Moulding and enrobing ===
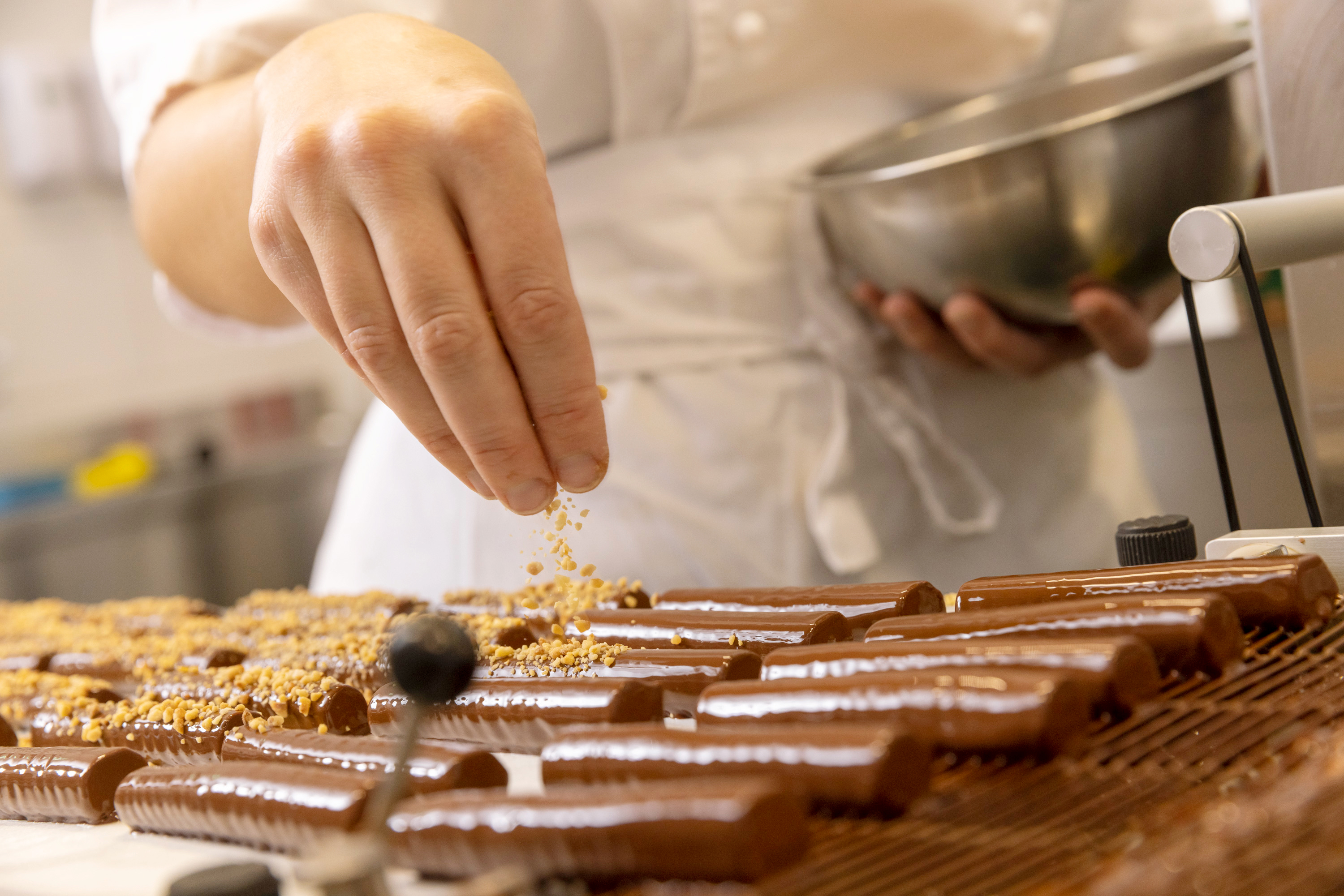
Chocolate bars being sprinkled with nuts after enrobing

Moulding involves depositing tempered liquid chocolate into rigid moulds of a predetermined shape and allowing it to solidify and crystallise properly. This process can be used to produce solid chocolate bars, hollow shells, and confectionery products with complex or three-dimensional forms. Hollow moulded shells can subsequently be filled with soft or liquid fillings. Because the chocolate conforms to the internal surface of the mould, moulding produces chocolate bars with a well defined geometry and a smooth, glossy surface. Therefore, the appearance of the finished product is largely determined by the design and surface finish of the mould.

Enrobing, by contrast, is a coating process in which a pre-formed centre is covered with a layer of chocolate, usually couverture. Centres may include biscuits or firm pastes that have been previously cut or extruded. In an industrial enrobing line, the centres are conveyed on a mesh belt through a curtain of tempered chocolate, which covers their upper and lateral surfaces. A bottoming section applies chocolate to the underside, while air blowers remove excess chocolate and regulate the coating thickness. The coated products then pass through a cooling section, where the chocolate solidifies to form the finished shell. Unlike moulded products, enrobed products generally retain the shape of their centres and exhibit a more rustic surface, with characteristic ripples, waves, or other marks produced during the coating process.

=== Packaging ===
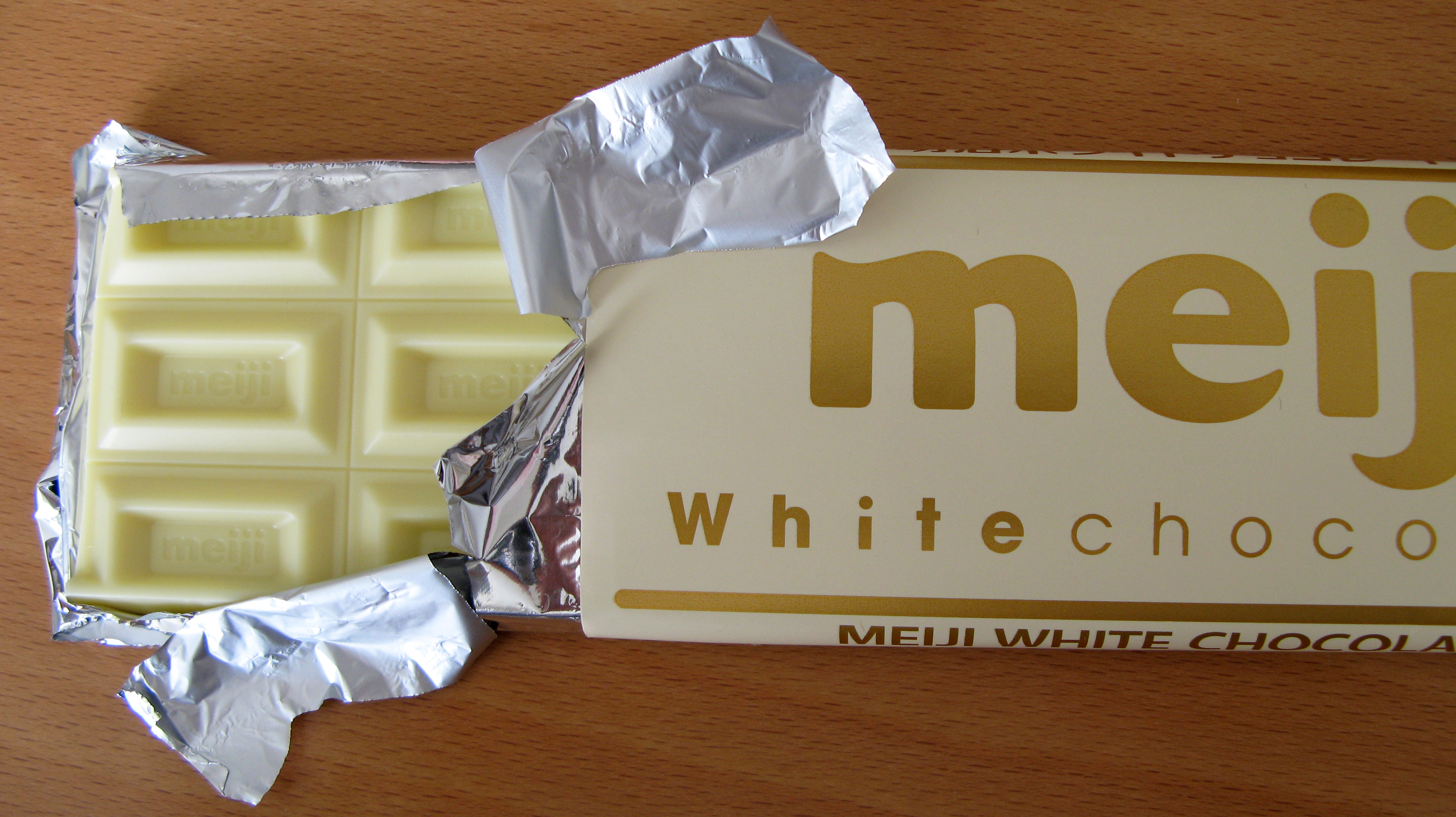
White chocolate wrapped in aluminum foil with a printed paper sleeve

Chocolate packaging requires an effective barrier against light, oxygen, moisture, and external odors to prevent storage-related defects. Most chocolate makers use aluminum foil (which replaced earlier tin foil) supplemented by an additional paper or paperboard outer wrapping that also serves as a printing substrate. Historically, chocolate bars were wrapped in unsealed foil, using its "dead-fold" properties to conform closely to the shape of the product. Modern packaging has evolved toward advanced laminates and synthetic materials that provide enhanced protection and improved sealing performance. Today, aluminum foil and LDPE laminates are commonly used in chocolate packaging, combining aluminum's barrier properties with the heat-sealability of LDPE. Increasingly, aluminum foil is also being replaced by high-barrier plastic-based films that combine product protection with a printable surface.

== Popular culture ==
=== Literature and film ===
The Wonka Bar was introduced as a fictional chocolate bar that served as a key story point in the 1964 novel Charlie and the Chocolate Factory by Roald Dahl. Wonka Bars appear in both film adaptations of the novel, Willy Wonka & the Chocolate Factory (1971) and Charlie and the Chocolate Factory (2005). Wonka Bars were subsequently manufactured and sold in the real world, formerly by the Willy Wonka Candy Company, a division of Nestlé.

== Records ==
=== Oldest extant ===
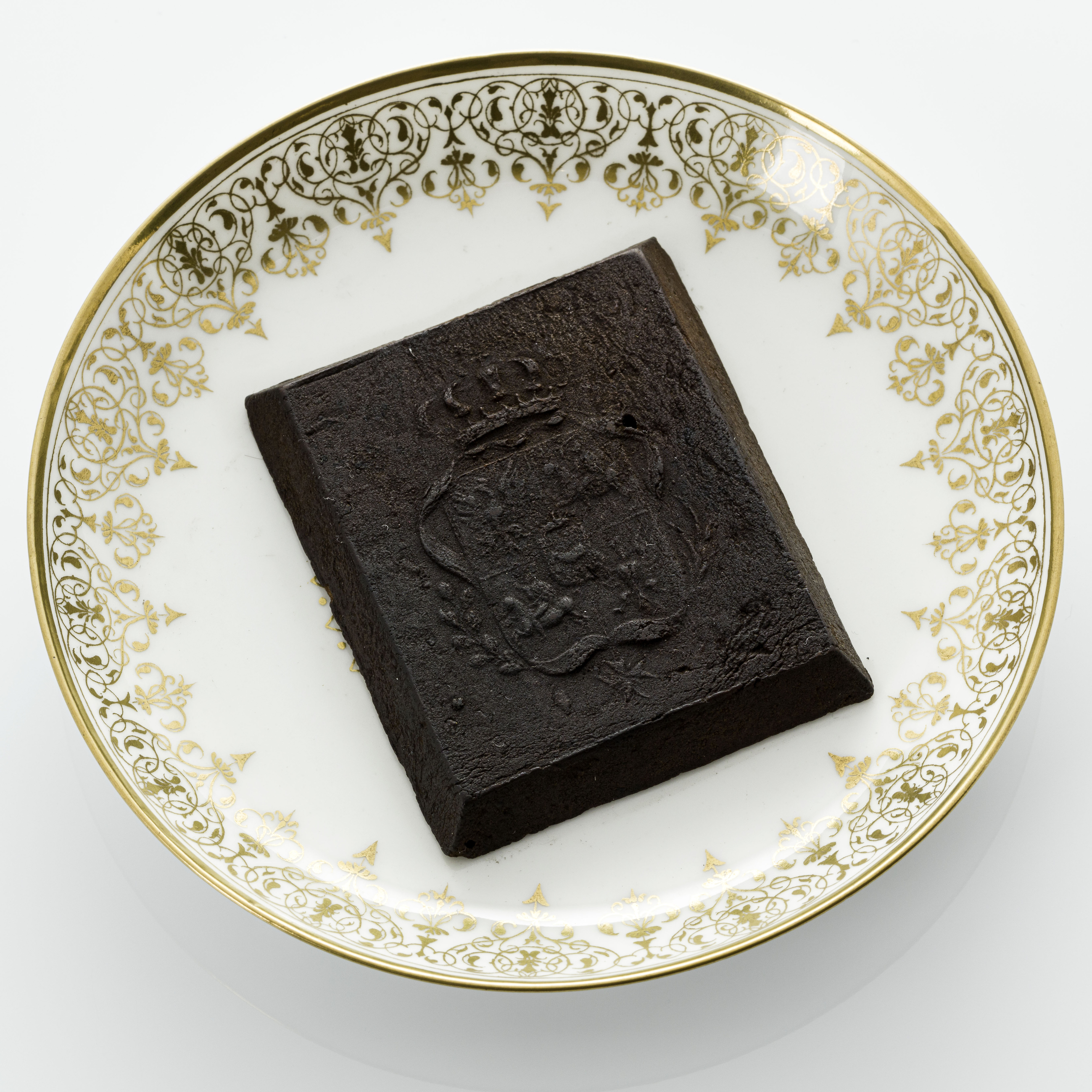
Chocolate bar manufactured in 1787

Some of the oldest preserved chocolate bars are two pieces of white and dark chocolate made between 1764 and 1795 for the king of Poland, Stanislaus Augustus Poniatowski, as a gift for his courtiers. Each bar, possibly made by the royal confectioner in Warsaw, bears the King's monogram, SAR, and is on display in his summer residence, Palace on the Water, in Warsaw.

Another chocolate bar, also made for the king of Poland in 1787, is preserved at the Jagiellonian University Museum. It features a five-field cartouche bearing the coats of arms of Poland, Lithuania, and the Poniatowski family, surmounted by a crown.

=== World's largest ===
The world's largest chocolate bar was produced as a stunt by Thorntons plc (UK) on 7 October 2011. It weighed 5,792.50 kg (12,770.3 lb) and measured 4m by 4m by 0.35m.

On January 16, 2020, Mars Inc. received the Guinness World Record for largest chocolate nut bar. They produced a 12-foot by 27.5-inch by 27.5-inch Snickers that weighed 4,728 lbs which is the equivalent of 41,000 single-size Snickers.

On January 31, 2020, the Hershey Company beat the Guinness World Record for largest chocolate nut bar surpassing Mars Inc.'s Gigantic Snickers bar with a gigantic Reese's Take 5 Bar measuring 9 by 5.5 by 2 feet and weighing 5,943 lbs. The Take 5 chocolate bar gets its name from the 5 ingredients it contains: Reese's peanut butter, peanuts, pretzels, caramel and chocolate.

== See also ==
- Bar (food), overview of bars
- Energy bar
- Granola bar
- List of chocolate bar brands
- List of chocolate-covered foods
- United States military chocolate
