= Lago Group =

Italian confectionery company

Lago Group S.p.A. (also known as Elledi) is an Italian confectionery company specialising in the production of wafers. They were founded in 1968 and became a public company in 1981. Most of their market is in Italy, with the rest of their sales to Europe and a few percent exported to other continents.
