= Wafer =

Thin type of biscuit

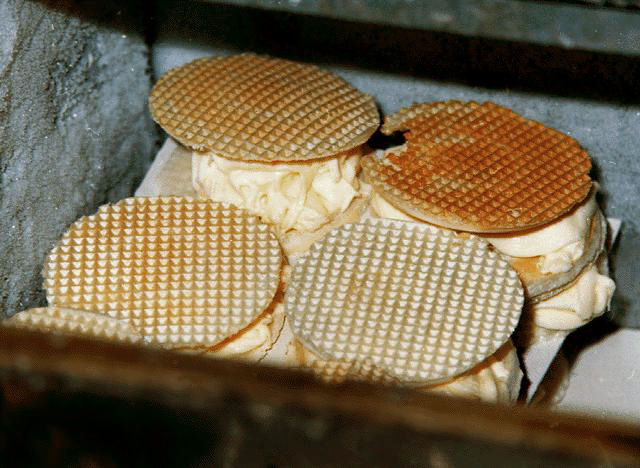
- Traditional Iranian ice cream sandwiches prepared with wafers
- Type: Cookie

A wafer is a crisp, often sweet, very thin, flat, light biscuit, often used to decorate ice cream, and also used as a garnish on some sweet dishes. They frequently have a waffle surface pattern but may also be patterned with insignia of the food's manufacturer or may be patternless. Some chocolate bars, such as Kit Kat and Toffee Crisp, are wafers with chocolate in and around them. This adds an extra layer of texture which makes the dish it Is served with have a slight bit of crunch to it.

== Communion wafers ==
In Christianity, a communion wafer is a type of unleavened bread consumed during the Eucharist.

== Spa wafer ==
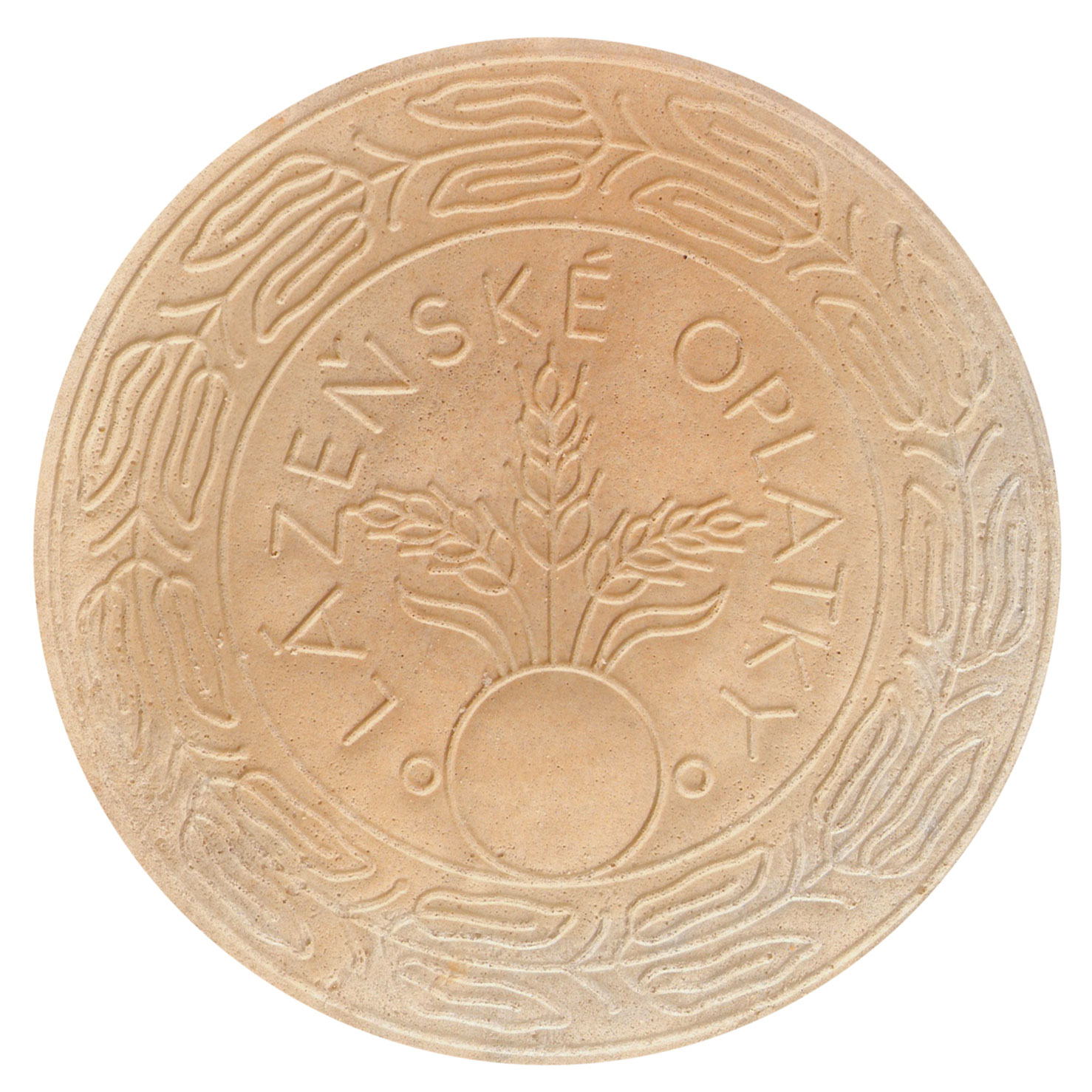
A round Carlsbad spa wafer.

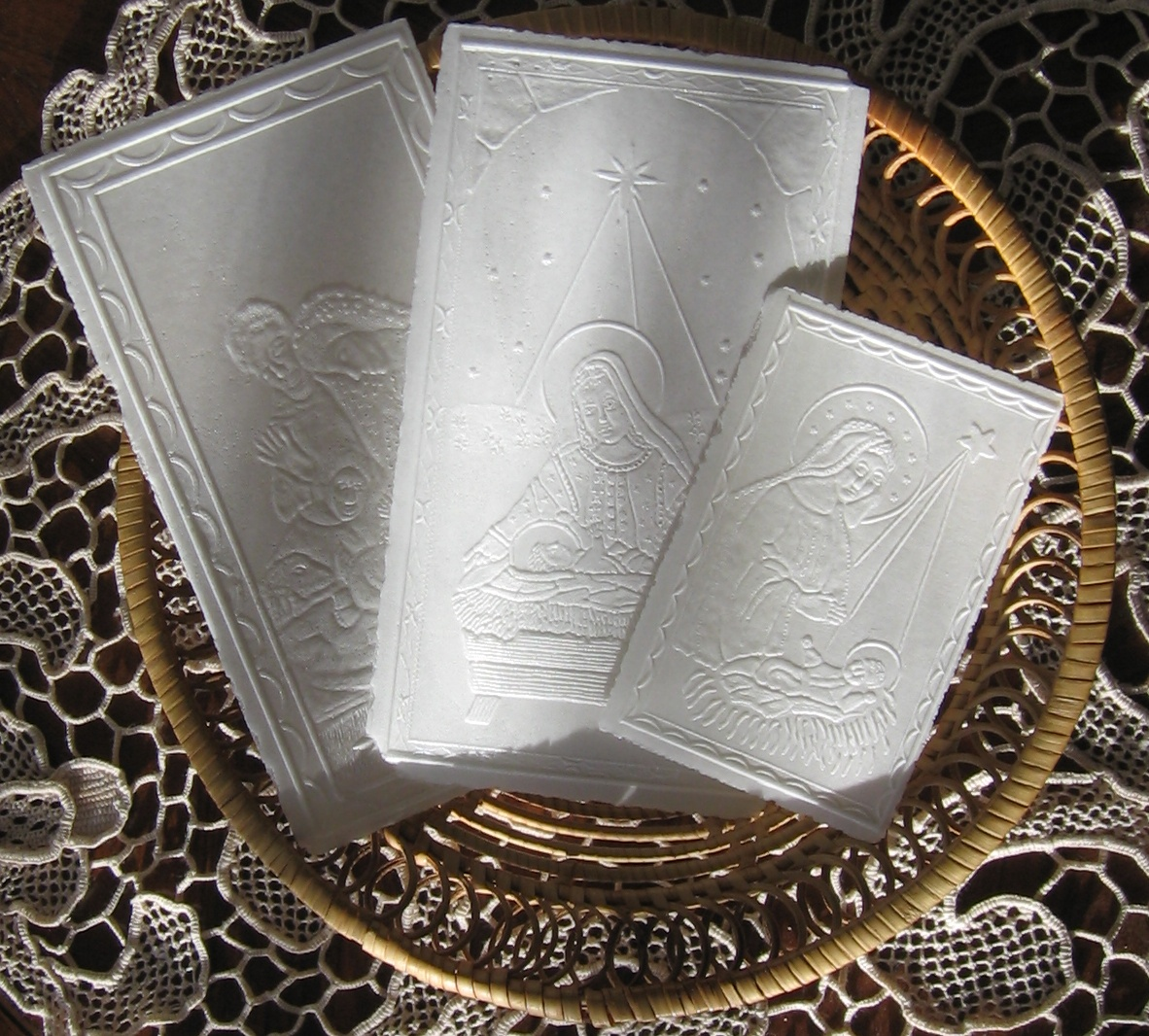
Polish Christmas wafers, depicting Christian scenes.

Special "spa wafers" (Czech: lázeňské oplatky, Slovak: kúpeľné oblátky) are produced in the spa towns of the Czech Republic and the Slovak Republic (e.g. Piešťany, Karlovy Vary and Mariánské Lázně).

A similar biscuit is cooked in Hungary called the Molnárkalács. Its origins can be traced back to the Palóc population. It is round and hard (sometimes also rolled) decorated with folk symbols and images and text instead of a simple spiral. It is also eaten with toppings like jams. It is made with special pressing tool, the sütővas.

== Christmas wafer ==
Christmas wafers are made of only wheat flour and water. Their patterns often depict religious scenes and are a Central European Roman Catholic Christmas tradition celebrated in Polish, Slovak, Lithuanian and Italian families on Christmas Eve. These do not have sacramental value like the communion wafer. Christmas wafers are symbolic bread to share among guests to emphasize the close relationship by eating bread together. This gesture has a positive meaning, but additional wishes are often made as well. They are called opłatek (Latin: oblatum) in Polish, as opposed to wafel, which denotes a common wafer.

== Oblea ==
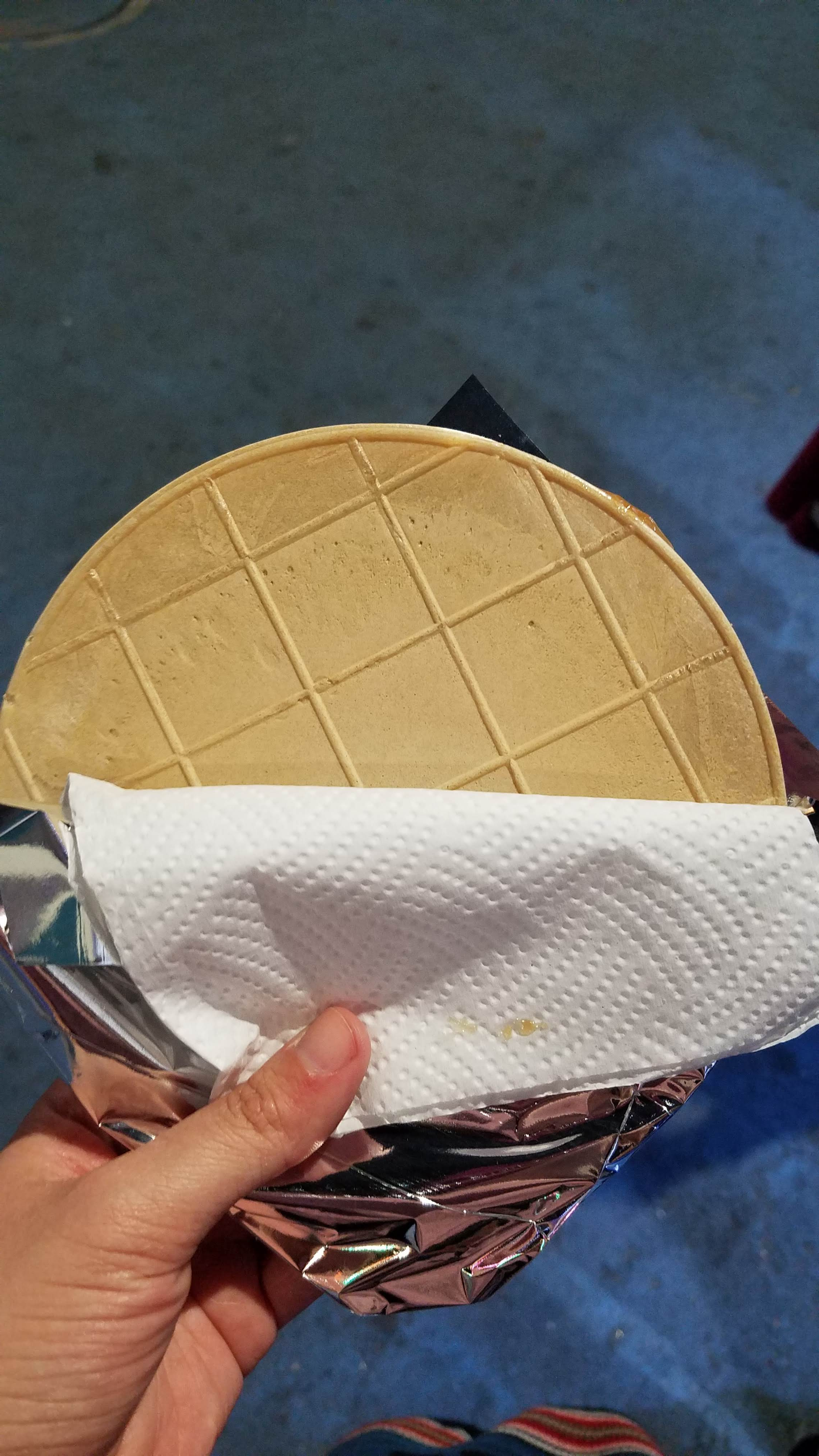
An oblea

A variation of a wafer, considered a part of the traditional cuisine in Argentina, Colombia, Ecuador, Guatemala, El Salvador, Venezuela, and Mexico, is known as an oblea. It is usually eaten as a dessert with two pieces filled with arequipe, dulce de leche, or cajeta (milk caramel), and/or condensed milk in the middle. In some places, they might contain cheese, fruit, or whipped cream, among others.

== Pink wafer ==
The pink wafer is a wafer-based confectionery originally made by Edinburgh's Crawford's Biscuits in the United Kingdom. It is now made by United Biscuits, the company that took over the firm in 1960, still using the Crawford's name. The snack consists of crème sandwiched between wafers (dyed pink).

There is a similar product branded Pink Panther wafers.

== Freska ==
Freska (Egyptian Arabic: فريسكه; [freska]) is an Egyptian wafer sold only on beaches in the summertime. It is made from two thin circular wafers filled with a thin layer of honey syrup.

== Variations ==
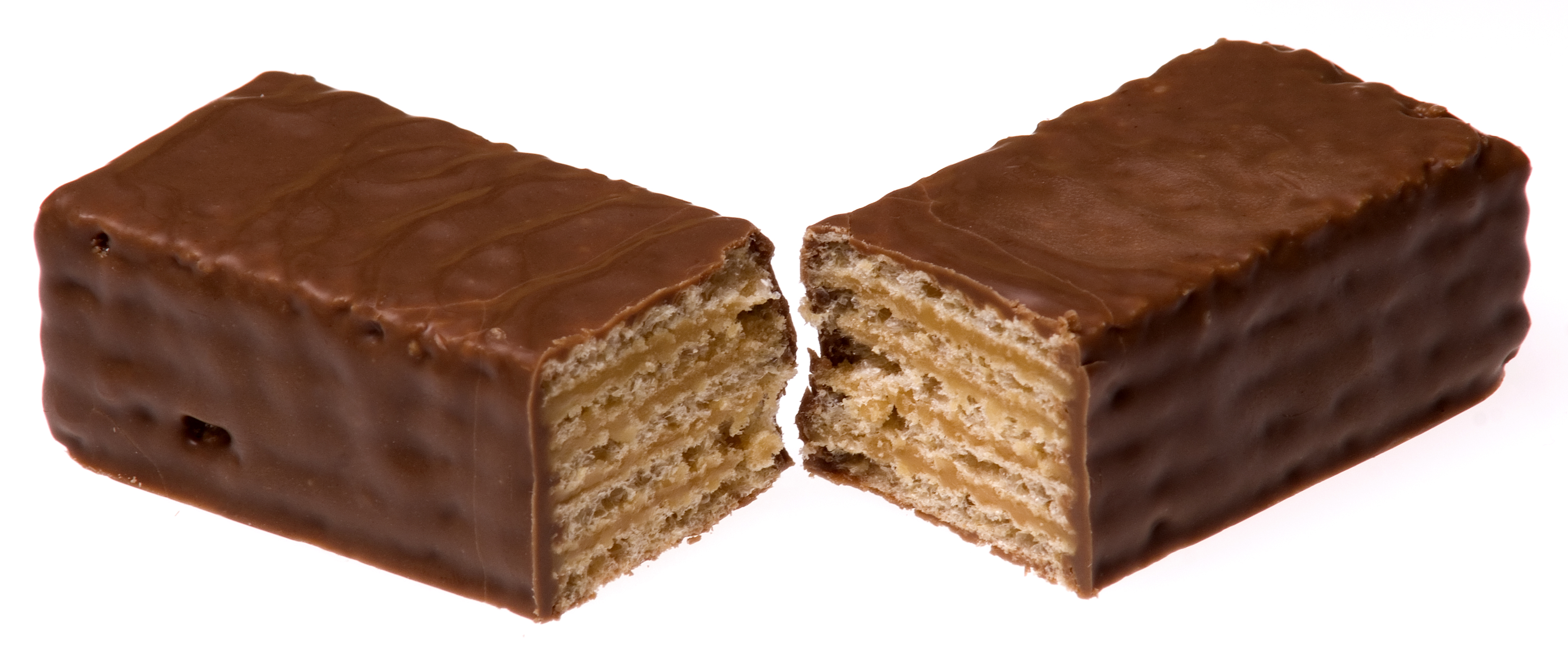
A chocolate-covered wafer

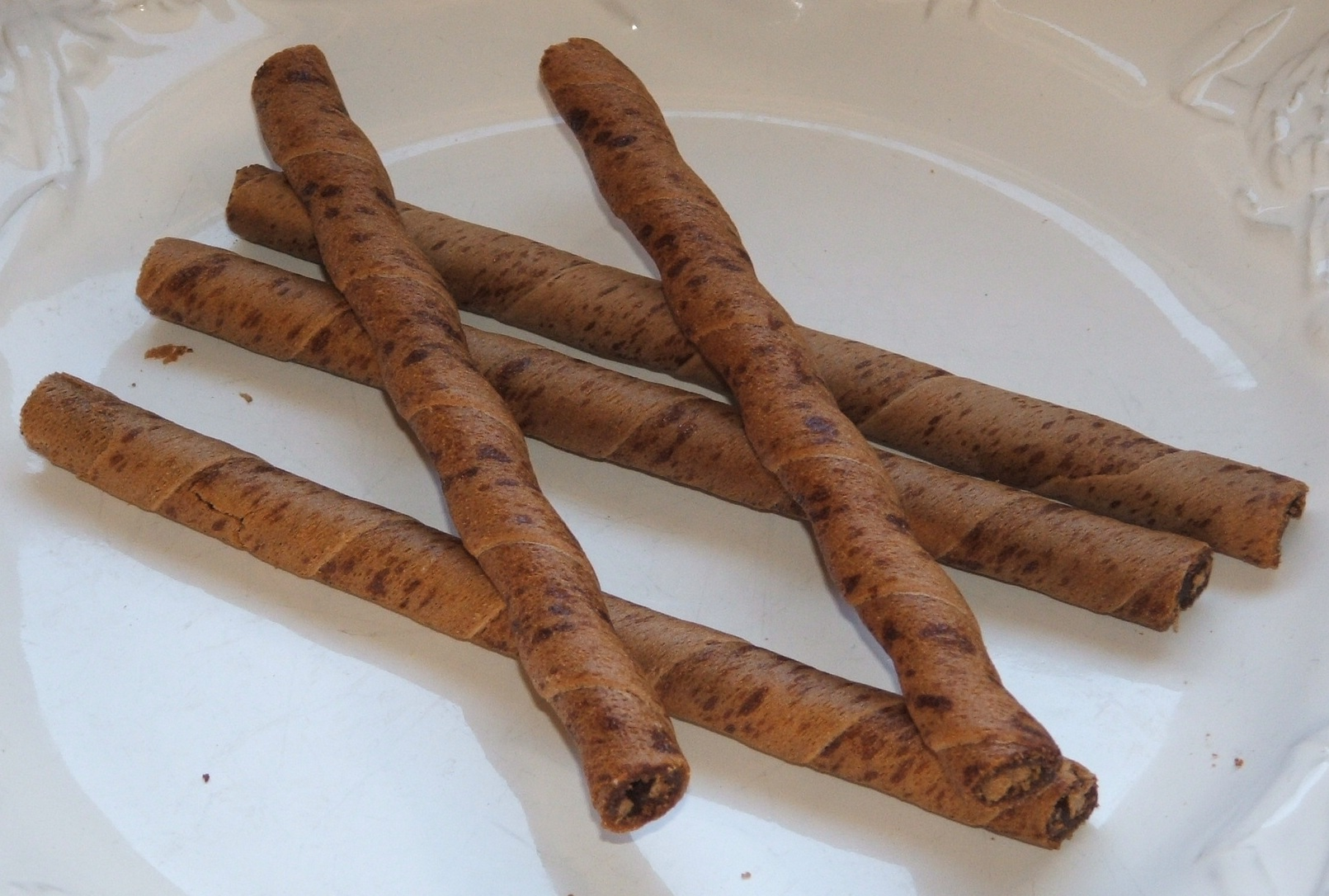
Rolled wafers

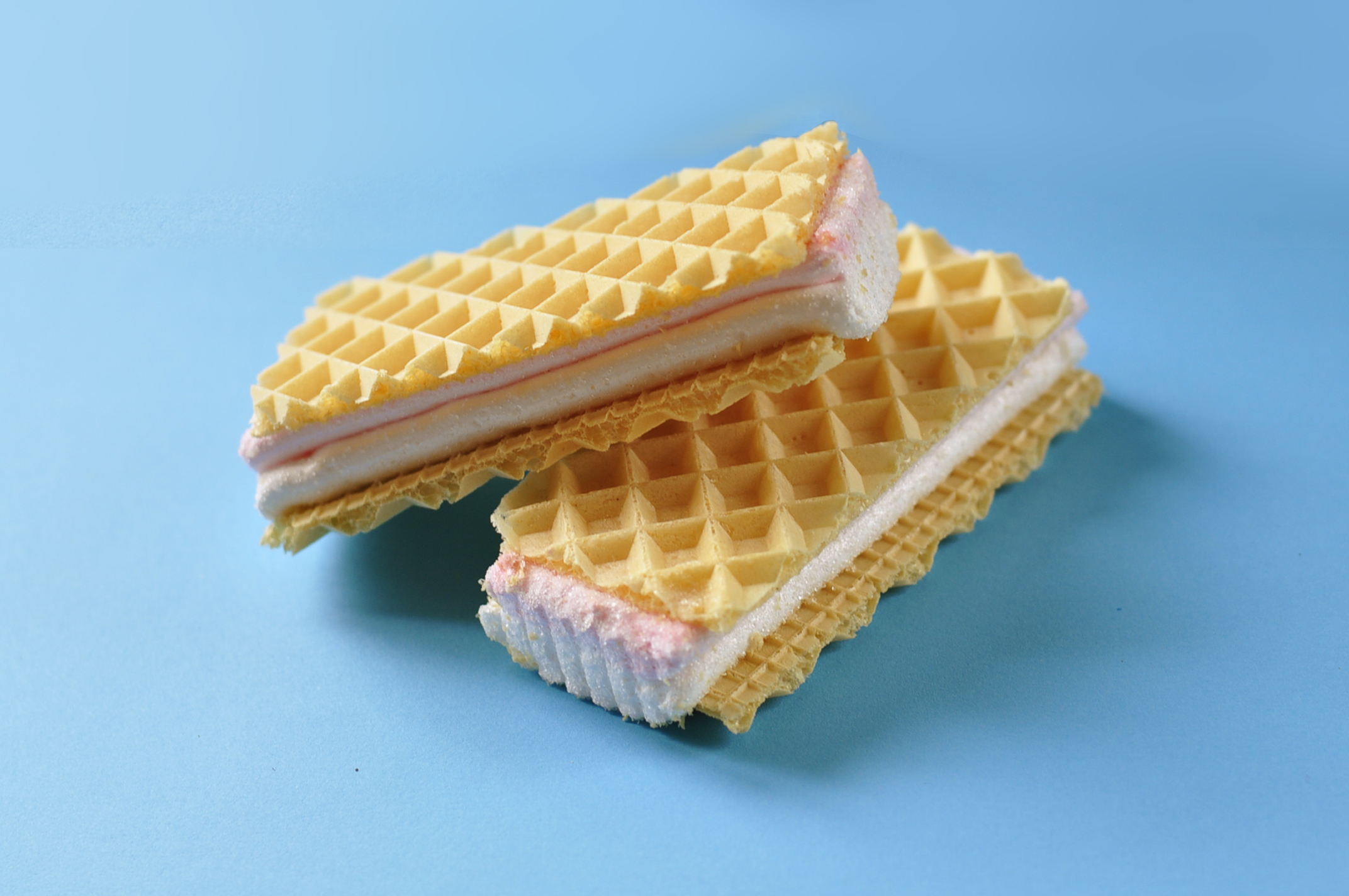
Pink 'n' Whites (marshmallow sandwiched in wafers)

=== Flavours ===
Some wafers are produced with a chocolate covering. Another popular flavor is lemon.

=== Shapes ===
Piroulines and Barquillos are wafers rolled into a tube, and sometimes filled with cream.

== See also ==
- ANZAC wafer, an ironic term for army-issue hardtack biscuit in World Wars I and II
- Elledi, an Italian wafer confectionery and manufacturer
- Horalky, a Slovak wafer bar brand
- Loacker, an Italian wafer manufacturer
- Manner, Austrian confectioner known for wafers
- Neapolitan wafer, the chocolate and hazelnut cream sandwiched wafers
- Nilla Wafers, a thicker, small, round American cookie with a vanilla flavor
- Mille-feuille, the French layered pastry
- Pirouline, a US brand of rolled wafer filled with a flavored creme
- Stroopwafel, the Dutch thin, caramel filled waffle
- Tompouce, the Benelux pastry
- Waffle, the pressed cake
