= Carl Manner =

- Born: 18 July 1929; Hernals, Vienna
- Died: 19 April 2017 (aged 87)
- Occupation: Businessperson
- Known for: Chairman of the Supervisory Board of Josef Manner & Comp. AG

Carl Manner (18 July 1929 – 19 April 2017) was Chairman of the Supervisory Board of Josef Manner & Comp. AG, a Viennese confectionery factory.
