= Neapolitan wafer =

Wafer and chocolate-cream sandwich biscuits

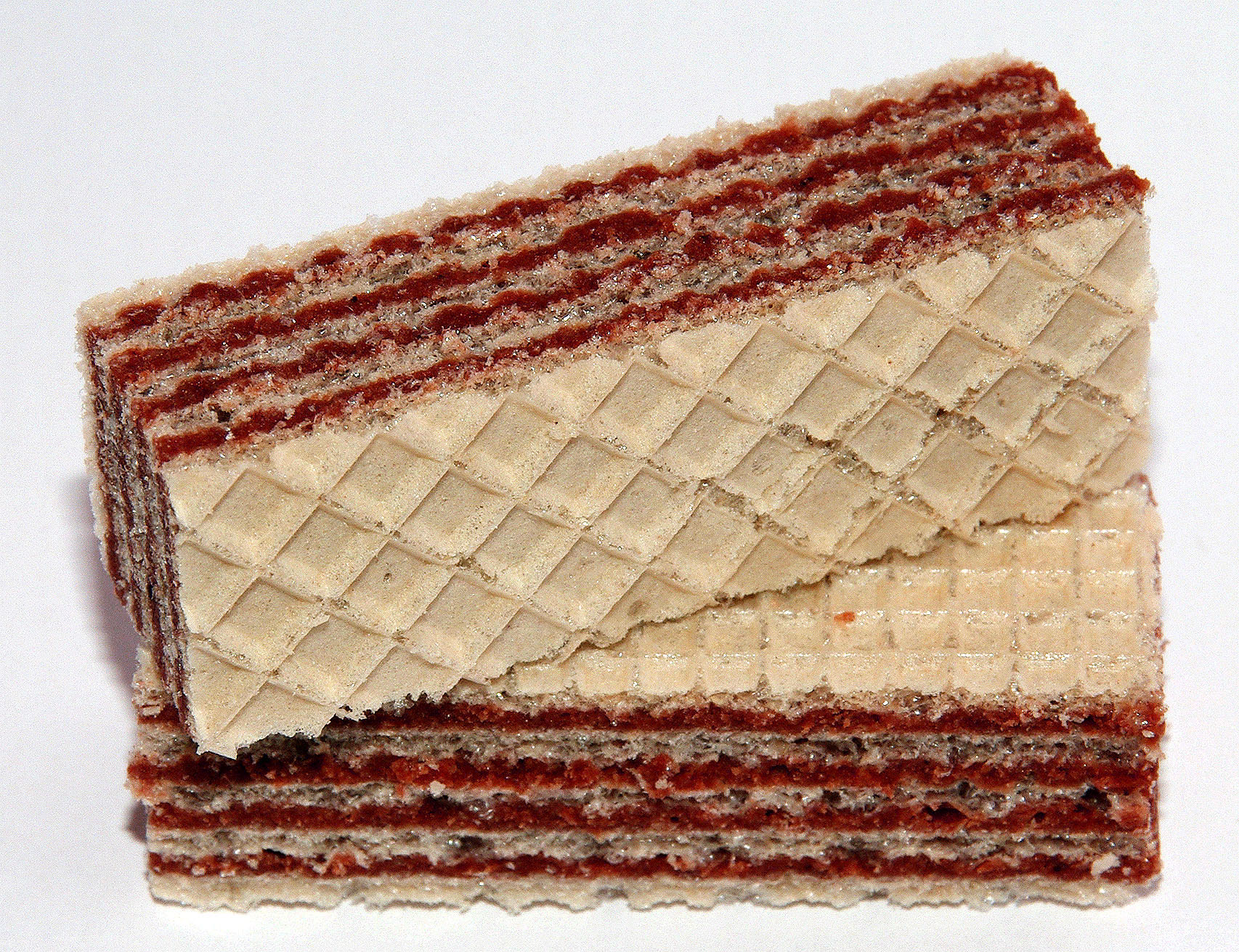
- Neapolitan wafers stacked, showing five layers of wafer and four of hazelnut-chocolate cream
- Type: Wafer
- Place of origin: Austria
- Created by: Manner (confectionery)
- Main ingredients: Hazelnuts

Neapolitan wafers (also called gaufrettes in some countries, though this term can refer to other foods) are wafer and chocolate-cream sandwich biscuits, first made by the Austrian company Manner in 1898.

Using hazelnuts imported from the area of Naples, Italy, to make the hazelnut-flavoured chocolate cream filling, they have five wafers and four layers of cream in their 49 millimetres (1.9 in) × 17 millimetres (0.67 in) × 17 millimetres (0.67 in) biscuit size. The basic recipe has remained unchanged into the 21st century.

Manner still sells the biscuits in blocks of ten. Many other companies have copied the idea, most often coating the bar in chocolate.

They were mass-produced in the USSR and the Eastern Bloc for their cheap production cost, long shelf-life and simple production method. Up to this day they are a popular treat in Russia and post-soviet countries, especially popular among seniors.
