= Manner (confectionery) =

Austrian line of confectionery

Logo

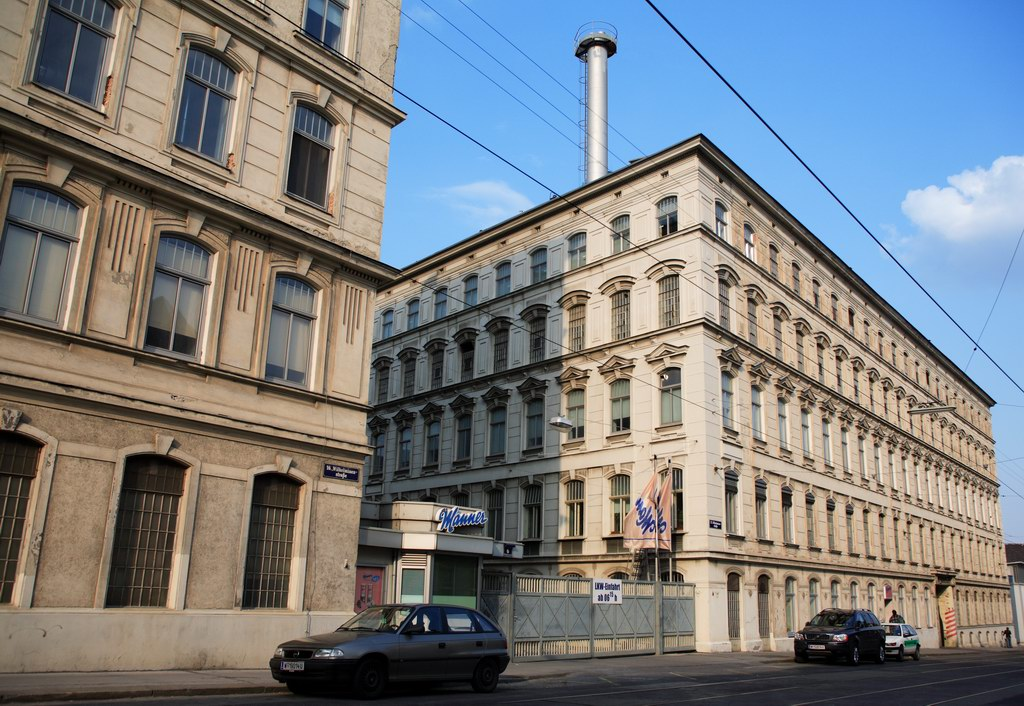
The Manner Factory in Hernals, Vienna

Manner (German pronunciation: [ˈmanɐ]) is a line of confectionery from the Austrian conglomerate Josef Manner & Comp AG. The corporation, founded in 1890, produces a wide assortment of confectionery products. These include wafers, long-life confectionery, chocolate-based confectionery, sweets, cocoa and a variety of seasonal products.

The company's best-known product are the "Neapolitan wafers", introduced in 1898. They are sold in blocks of ten 47 x 17 x 17 mm hazelnut-cream filled wafers. The hazelnuts were originally imported from the Naples region in Italy, hence the name.

The company logo is a picture of St Stephen's Cathedral in Vienna. This dates to the 1890s, when Josef Manner (1865–1947) opened his first shop next to the cathedral. The Archdiocese of Vienna and the Manner Company agreed that the company may use the cathedral in its logo in return for funding the wages of one stonemason performing repair work on the structure.

== History ==
=== Rise to become the leading confection company ===
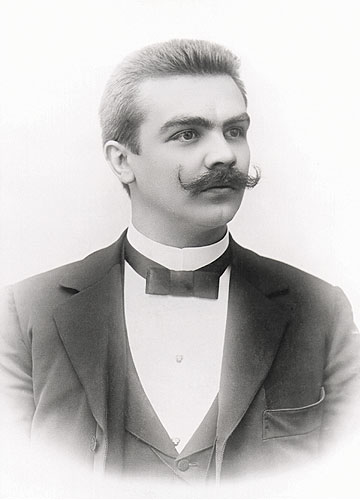
Founder Josef Manner

The experienced businessman Josef Manner ran a small shop on Stephansplatz in Vienna, where he offered chocolate and fig coffee. Manner acquired the concession and the premises of a small chocolate producer in Margareten and founded the "Josef Manner Chocolate Factory" on 1 March 1890 together with his brothers. Just six months later they moved to Hernals. By 1897, the company already had 100 employees. The Manner cut was invented in 1898.

In 1900, Johann Georg Riedl took over half of the shares in the company and laid the foundation for the collaboration between the families that continues to this day. By 1913, Josef Manner had risen to become the leading confectionery producer in Austria-Hungary, when the Wilhelminenstraße in Vienna-Hernals factory which is still in use today, was built. In October 1913, the company was converted into a public limited company and had 3,000 employees. From March 1922, the Anglo-Austrian Bank held the majority of company shares. Due to restrictions of the economic crisis of 1935, the company had to reduce the share capital from 6 to 4.5 million schillings and the company founder Josef Manner withdrew from the operative business the same year.

=== Second World War ===
During the National Socialist period, Manner benefited from orders from the Wehrmacht, the "Aryanization" of Jewish property and the exploitation of forced labourers. Despite all the cuts, growth was recorded during the Second World War, and the 1939 financial year was "generally satisfactory". In the 1941 financial year an income of 3.3 million Reichsmarks was generated and a dividend of 6% was distributed. According to Carl Manner, the company was conscripted as an "army supplier" and produced chocolate and biscuits for the troops of the German Wehrmacht, and the Scho-Ka-Kola known as "Fliegerschokolade" was produced for the Luftwaffe pilots. At that time, Manner was a wartime operation and was allocated cocoa beans until 1945. The company was also under the management of a National Socialist works manager, the son of the company founder was only active as a technical manager in the company. The bombardments caused relatively little damage to the factory building.

=== Since the end of the war ===
At the end of the war, the sugar and cocoa stocks still stored in the factory were requisitioned by the Russian occupying forces, and the company had to struggle with a shortage of raw materials for two years. In 1947 the company founder Josef Manner died at the age of 82. In September 1953 his grandson Carl Manner joined the company and he was given power of attorney in 1959. In 1960, with the introduction of packaging in aluminum-coated foils with the typical red tear-off strip, the flavor-proof sealing of the now famous slices was introduced. As a result, sales rose again and in 1964 record sales were reported for the first time since 1914. In 1970 the competitors Napoli and Casali were taken over by way of a merger, whereby the product range was significantly expanded and the owner family of Napoli-Casali joined the Manner company.

A collaboration with Nestlé in Hungary after the fall of the Iron Curtain failed in the 1990s.

The corporate form is a joint-stock company listed on the Vienna Stock Exchange, in which a large part of the shares are family-owned. Shares held by family members who no longer have an interest in the company are constantly being bought up by the majority owners, so that no outsider can become a significant co-owner.

In 2005, the announcement by the Austrian Federal Monuments Office caused a stir that it intended to place the Manner building on Wilhelminenstraße 6 in Vienna-Hernals under monument protection. The company management replied that the relocation of the production facility would be the result for economic reasons, which would cause outrage among a large part of the Viennese population.

Manner has been running a flagship store on Stephansplatz in the Episcopal Palace since June 2004. There has been a flagship store at Vienna Airport since June 2006. With the aim of increasing sales in foreign markets, Manner opened its own sales subsidiaries in Slovenia, the Czech Republic and Germany. In 2010, Manner set up a shop with a café on Residenzplatz in Salzburg. On 10 May 2018, a Manner shop was opened in Graz on the main square, and on 19 July 2019 one opened in the Murpark shopping centre.

Manner's total turnover in 2009 was 155.4 million euros with an export quota of approximately 55%. This resulted in an annual surplus of 4.496 million euros and a balance sheet profit of 1.89 million euros. At the end of 2011, Manner announced the expansion of the Vienna site, where the production of waffles was to be concentrated beginning in 2015. At the same time, concepts for the subsequent use of the Perg site were being worked on. In 2013 a profit of around 180 million euros were achieved and around 40 million euros were invested in the Vienna plant. On 17 October 2014, part of the Manner factory in Hernals which was undergoing renovations, collapsed. In 2016, the production facilities were temporarily relocated from Perg in Upper Austria to Vienna.

Carl Manner ran the company as the third generation until his death in 2017. He was a member of the company's Management Board from 1970 and most recently President of the Supervisory Board.

The plant in Vienna was extensively renovated. At the same time and in cooperation with Wien Energie, the use of waste heat from the exhaust air was installed in 2017 theoretically supplying around 600 households with district heating. In 2020, the conversion was completed where the factory in Perg was closed and the machines from there were installed in Vienna.

== Trademark St. Stephen's Cathedral ==
Manner has used Vienna's St. Stephen's Cathedral as a trademark since 1889, it was designed by Josef Diltsch. On 17 December 1999, Carl Manner received the gold Order of St. Stephen for the services of his company.

Manner Original Neapolitaner
Nutritional value per 100g
- Energy: 485 kcal (2,030 kJ)
- Carbohydrates: 65 g
- Sugars: 46 g
- Fat: 22 g
- Saturated: 13 g
- Protein: 5.6 g
Vitamins and minerals
Minerals	Quantity %DV^{†}
Sodium	7% 150 mg
- ^{†}Percentages estimated using US recommendations for adults.

== Original Manner Neapolitan wafers ==
The Original Manner Neapolitaner Schnitte was first documented in 1898 as "Neapolitaner Schnitte No. 239". Initially, the slices were sold loose. From 1924 the Manner wafers were offered in five rows of two, with a total of 75 g, initially in a folding box, from 1960 in a water vapor-tight packaging made of aluminium-paper composite foil with a tear-off strip and a tab, as a flat, almost square cuboid.

Manner Lemon Wafer
Nutritional value per 100g
- Energy: 503 kcal (2,100 kJ)
- Carbohydrates: 66 g
- Sugars: 46 g
- Fat: 25 g
- Saturated: 21 g
- Protein: 2.9 g
Vitamins and minerals
Minerals	Quantity %DV^{†}
Sodium	4% 100 mg
- ^{†}Percentages estimated using US recommendations for adults.

== Criticism ==
In 2022, following a lawsuit by the Association for Consumer Information (VKI) on behalf of the Ministry of Social Affairs, the Vienna Commercial Court convicted the manufacturer Manner of misleading packaging (not final). The allegation is a deception, since three similar, different-tasting types of slices are packed in bulk bags of the same size, with two types containing 400 grams, but the third type Manner Mozart Mignon only 300 grams.

=== Products placements ===
- In the US TV series Friends, Manner wafers are sold as part of a product placement at the Central Perk café. In season 6, they are on display at the counter and are often clearly visible in the background in the café scenes.
- In the 2003 film Terminator 3: Rise of the Machines, the Terminator T-850, portrayed by Arnold Schwarzenegger, buys a packet of Manner wafers. €300,000 had to be paid for the product placement.

== Trivia ==
- On 16 October 2008, Austrian Post issued a stamp with Manner's classic advertising motif from the 1950s "... so good" in a circulation of 500,000. The face value of the stamp is 0.55 euros.
- The world's largest waffle oven with a daily capacity of 49 tons is located in the company's production facility in Vienna.
- On 17 July 2014, the day before Carl Manner's 85th birthday, 8,500 packs of Mannerschnitten were set up as dominoes in the ballroom of Vienna City Hall and fell with a single impact. The development of this world record campaign by the marketing department was managed by Marcel Pürrer.
- Carl Manner received his doctorate in mathematics and physics from the University of Vienna in 1952 and joined the company in 1953 at the age of 24. After the partial collapse of a building wing of the Vienna factory on 17 October 2014, he said that the St. Stephen's Cathedral trademark had stood the test and that no one was injured. Carl Manner died, at almost 88 years old, on 19 April 2017.
- On the occasion of the plant's 125th birthday on 5 March 2015, Manner declared: The partially collapsed house was completely demolished. Manner cut production was outsourced to Upper Austria for 2015. By 2017 new production facilities were to be built in Hernals. After the collapse, numerous machines had to be relocated to other areas of the company, and production had to work around the clock.
- The bike manufacturers KTM and Stilrad (2013, 2016) released bicycles in the Manner design.

== Literature ==
- Oliver Kühschelm: Manner. "Die Schnitte der Patrioten" In: Emil Brix/Ernst Bruckmüller, Hannes Stekl (Hrsg.): Memoria Austriae III – Unternehmer, Firmen, Produkte Verlag für Geschichte und Politik, Vienna 2005, ISBN 3-7028-0419-6, p. 97-130.
- Franz Mathis: Big Business in Österreich, Part 1: Österreichische Grossunternehmen in Kurzdarstellungen, Verlag für Geschichte u. Politik, Vienna 1987, p. 196

== See also ==
- St. Stephen's Cathedral, Vienna
