= Outline of chocolate =

Overview of and topical guide to chocolate

The following outline is provided as an overview of and topical guide to chocolate:

== What is chocolate? ==
- Chocolate – raw or processed food produced from the seed of the tropical Theobroma cacao tree. The seeds of the cacao tree have an intense bitter taste, and must be fermented to improve the flavour. Chocolate is a popular ingredient in confectionery items and candies.

=== What type of thing is chocolate? ===
Chocolate is a type of:

- Food – substance to provide nutritional support for the body, ingested by an organism and assimilated by the organism's cells in an effort to produce energy, maintain life, and/or stimulate growth.
  - Confectionery – the set of food items that are rich in sugar, any one or type of which is called a confection. Modern usage may include substances rich in artificial sweeteners as well.
    - Candy – confection made from a concentrated solution of sugar in water, to which flavourings and colourants are added. Candies come in numerous colours and varieties and have a long history in popular culture.
  - Ingredient – substance that forms part of a mixture (in a general sense). For example, in cooking, recipes specify which ingredients are used to prepare a specific dish. Chocolate is often used as an ingredient in dessert items, such as cakes and cookies.

=== What is chocolate made of? ===
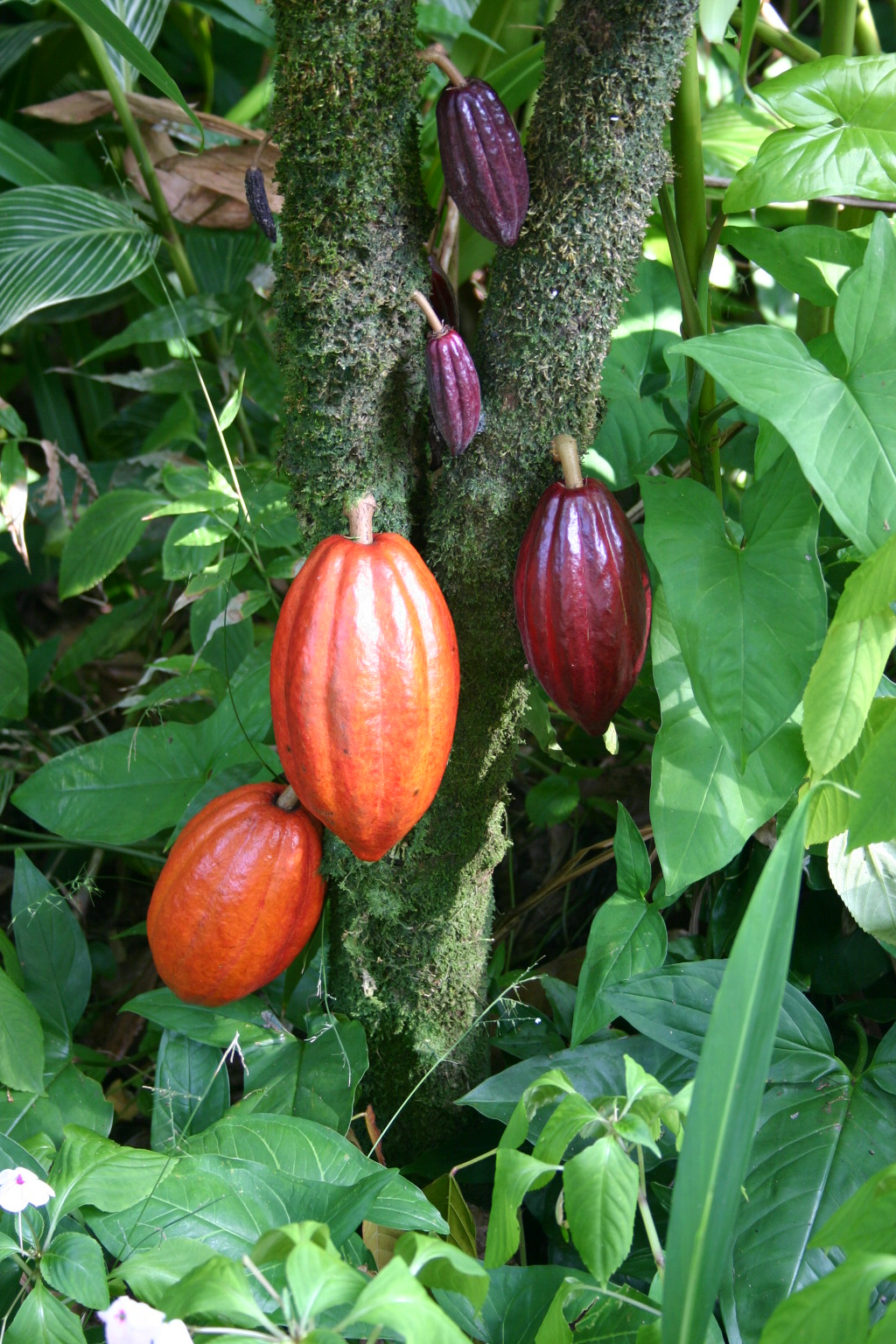
A cacao tree with fruit pods in various stages of ripening. Chocolate is created from the cacao bean.

==== Necessary ingredients ====
- Cocoa (processed cacao)
  - Cacao bean – Fatty seed of Theobroma cacao
    - Chocolate liquor, also known as chocolate mass – Pure cocoa mass in solid or semi-solid form
      - Cocoa butter – Pale-yellow, edible fat extracted from the cocoa bean
      - Cocoa powder – Defatted powder extracted from cocoa beans

==== Optional ingredients ====
- Milk – Nutrient-rich liquid produced by mammals
- Sugar – Sweet-tasting, water-soluble carbohydrates
- Vanilla – Spice extracted from Vanilla orchids
- Emulsifier – Mixture of two or more immiscible liquids
  - Lecithin – Generic term for amphiphilic substances of plant and animal origin
  - Polyglycerol polyricinoleate – Emulsion used in food production

===== Substances found in cacao =====
- Antioxidants – Compound that inhibits the oxidation of other molecules
  - Catechin – Secondary metabolite
  - Flavonols – Class of plant and fungus secondary metabolites
- Caffeine – Central nervous system stimulant
- Phenethylamine – psychoactive drug that is usually inactive when orally ingested because most of it is metabolized into phenylacetic acid by monoamine oxidase (MAO), preventing significant concentrations from reaching the brain
- Theobromine – also known as xantheose, it contains no bromine and has a similar, but lesser, effect to caffeine
- Theophylline – methylxanthine drug found in tea leaves

===== Source of cocoa =====
- Theobroma cacao, also known as Cacao tree – Species of tree grown for its seeds
- Types of cocoa beans
- Child labour in cocoa production – Use of children in the production of cocoa beans
- Environmental impact of cocoa production
- By country
  - List of countries by cocoa production
    - Cocoa production in Ivory Coast
    - Cocoa production in Ghana
    - Cocoa production in Nigeria
    - Cocoa production in São Tomé and Príncipe
    - Cocoa production in Sri Lanka

== Types ==
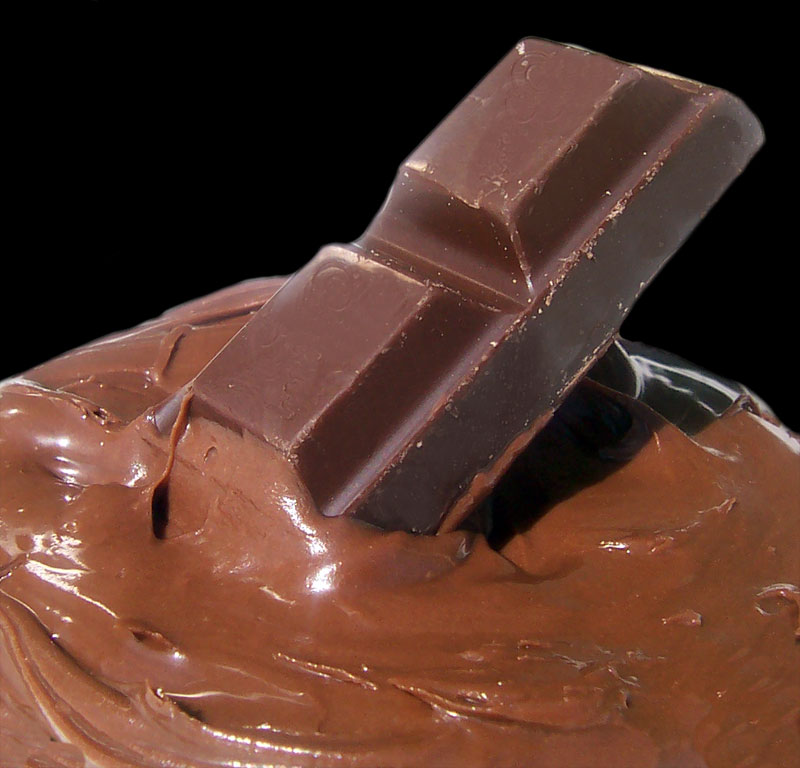

Types of chocolate – Classification of different chocolate types

- Aerated chocolate – Chocolate containing tiny gas bubbles
- Baking chocolate – Chocolate intended for use in baking
- Bittersweet chocolate – Term for dark chocolate used in the United States to indicate the amount of added sugar
- Cioccolato di Modica – Italian specialty chocolate
- Compound chocolate – Combination of cocoa, vegetable fat and sweeteners
- Couverture – Chocolate with more cocoa butter
- Dark chocolate – Chocolate with high cocoa solid content
- Gianduja – Confection made of chocolate and hazelnut
- Milk chocolate – Solid chocolate containing added milk
- Modeling chocolate – Classification of different chocolate types
- Organic chocolate – Certified-organic chocolate
- Raw chocolate – Chocolate made from unroasted cocoa beans
- Ruby chocolate – Variety of chocolate
- White chocolate – Chocolate made without cocoa solids
- By country
  - Belgian chocolate – Chocolate produced in Belgium
  - French chocolate – Chocolate produced in France
  - Swiss chocolate – Chocolate processed in Switzerland

== Production methods ==
- Broma process – Method of extracting cocoa butter from cocoa beans
- Conching – Process for refining chocolate by stirring at high temperature
- Dutch process cocoa – Cocoa treated with an alkalizing agent
- Enrober – Machine to coat a food item
- Federal Specification for Candy and Chocolate Confections – US standard for products made for use by the federal government
- Sugar crust – Method to prepare liquid filled chocolates
- Tempered chocolate – Technique in chocolate manufacture

== Producers and trade organizations ==
Chocolate industry

- Chocolaterie – Company that manufactures chocolates and sells them directly
- Chocolatier – Someone who makes confectionery from chocolate
  - List of chocolatiers
- Cocoa Processing Company Limited – Ghanaian cocoa processing company
- International Cocoa Initiative – Nonprofit organization
- Kuapa Kokoo – Fairtrade-certified cocoa farmers organisation in Ghana
- Bean-to-bar – Business model in chocolate production
  - List of bean-to-bar chocolate manufacturers

== Brands ==
- List of chocolate bar brands
  - Scho-Ka-Kola – German chocolate brand containing coffee and kola nut

== Edibles ==
- Brand names:
  - Death by Chocolate – Various desserts that feature chocolate
- Candy – Sweet confection
  - Chocolate bar – Confection
  - Chocolate-coated marshmallow treats – Marshmallow, usually on a wafer base, coated in chocolate
  - Chocolate-coated peanut – Confectionery
  - Chocolate-coated raisin – Raisins coated in a shell of milk, dark or white chocolate.
- Cereals
  - Cocoa Frosted Flakes – Sugar coated corn flakes with cocoa flavouring
  - Cocoa Krispies – Cocoa flavored version of Rice Krispies
  - Cocoa Puffs – Breakfast cereal made by General Mills
  - Cookie Crisp – Breakfast cereal made by General Mills
  - List of breakfast cereals
- Chocolate cake – Baked cake flavored with chocolate
  - Chocolate layer cake – Cake made from stacked layers of cake held together by filling
    - Black Forest gateau – Chocolate sponge cake with cherries
  - Chocolate soufflé cake – Egg-based baked dish
  - Devil's food cake – Moist, airy, rich chocolate layer cake
  - Ding Dong – Small chocolate cake of hockey puck size
  - Flourless chocolate cake – Chocolate custard cake
  - Fudge cake – Baked cake flavored with chocolate
  - Garash cake – Austrian chocolate and walnut cake
  - German chocolate cake – Layered chocolate cake named after Samuel German
  - Joffre cake – Chocolate buttermilk layer cake
  - Molten chocolate cake – Dessert
  - Red velvet cake – Red layer cake with icing
  - Sachertorte – Chocolate cake
  - Wacky cake – Type of cake commonly made during the Great Depression
- Chocolate pudding – Class of desserts with chocolate flavours
- Chocolate spread – Sweet chocolate-flavored paste
- Chocolate syrup – Chocolate-flavored condiment used as a topping or ingredient
- Chocolates –
  - Chocolate money – Gold foil covered chocolates in the shape of coins
  - Mint chocolate – Food produced from cacao seeds
- Confectionery – Art of making confections or sweet foods
  - Choco pie – Snack cookie with chocolate coating
  - Chocolate crackles – Confection in Australia and New Zealand made of puffed rice
  - Chocolate truffle – Type of chocolate confectionery
  - Rum ball – Truffle-like confection of cookie butter flavored with chocolate and rum
- Cookie – Small, flat and sweetened baked food
  - Afghan biscuit – Traditional biscuit in New Zealand
  - Black and white cookie – Round cookie with chocolate and vanilla frosting
  - Chocolate biscuit – Biscuit flavoured with or covered in chocolate
  - Chocolate brownie – Baked confection
  - Chocolate chip – Small chunk of chocolate used as an ingredient
  - Chocolate chip cookie – Drop cookie featuring chocolate chips
  - List of biscuits and cookies
- Dessert – Dish of sweet foods
  - Chocolate salami – Italian and Portuguese chocolate dessert
  - Molten chocolate cake – Dessert
  - Mousse – Soft creamy prepared food using air bubbles for texture
- Ice cream – Frozen dessert
  - Chocolate chip – Small chunk of chocolate used as an ingredient
  - Mint chocolate chip – Ice cream flavor

=== Drinks ===
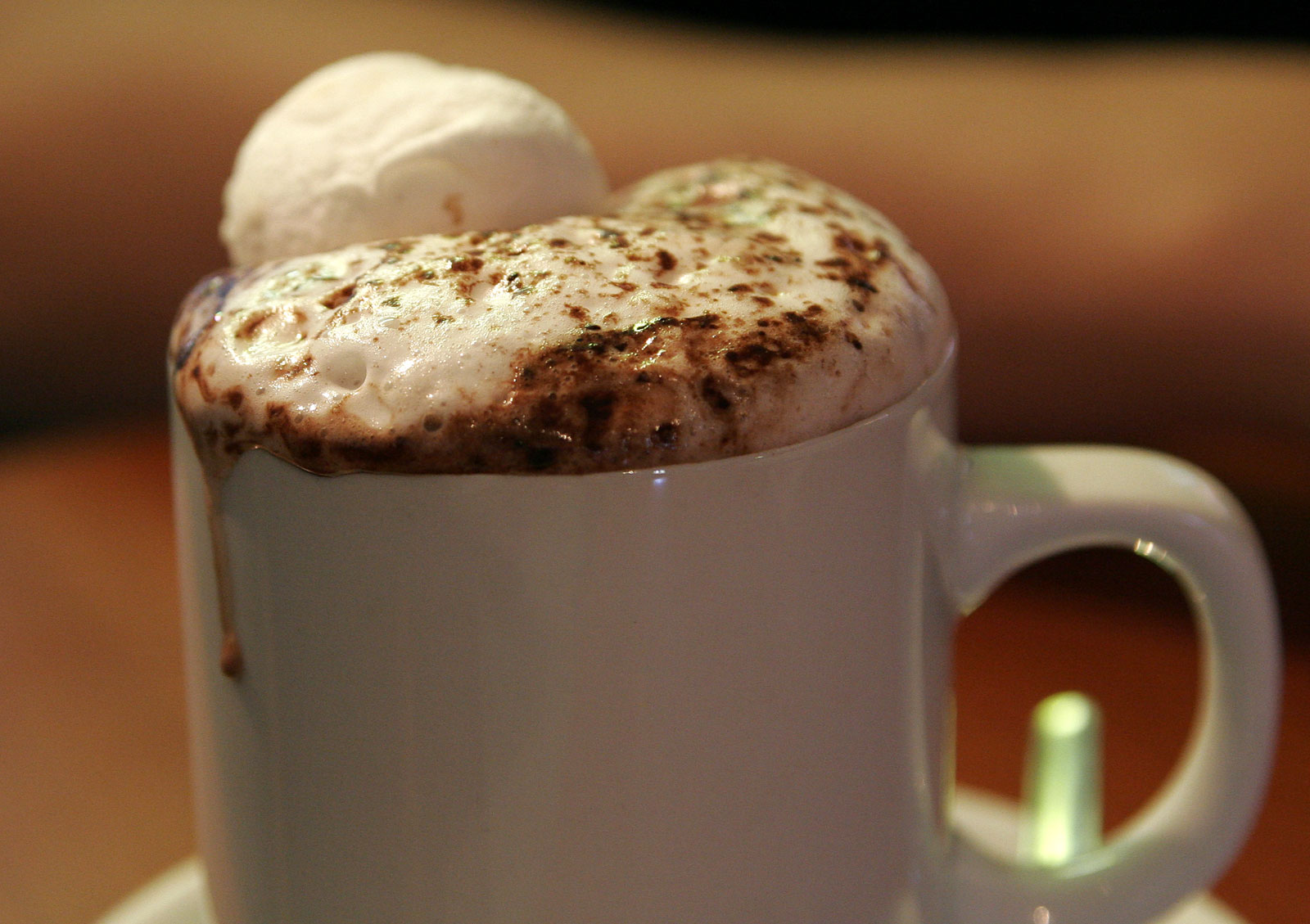
A mug of hot chocolate. Chocolate was first drunk rather than eaten.

- Cafe mocha – Chocolate-flavored coffee drink
- Chocolate milk – Sweetened chocolate-flavoured milk
  - Banania – Chocolate drink
  - Nesquik – Brand of products made by Nestlé
  - Swiss Miss – American cocoa powder and pudding brand
  - Yoo-hoo – American brand of chocolate beverage
- Crème de cacao – A sweet liqueur that tastes like chocolate.
- Hot chocolate – Warm chocolate beverage in milk or water
- List of chocolate beverages – A list of notable beverages flavoured with chocolate

== History ==
- History of chocolate
- Chocolataire – Social gathering featuring chocolate

== Effects on health ==
- Theobromine poisoning – Overdose reaction to the xanthine alkaloid theobromine

== Other articles ==
- Chocolate agar – Growth medium – named for its colour, does not contain cocoa
- Chocolate fountain – Device for serving chocolate fondue
- Chocolate spread – Sweet chocolate-flavored paste
- Cocoa-free chocolate alternative
- Military chocolate
  - Military chocolate (United States) – Standard U.S. military ration item
  - Military chocolate (Switzerland) – Chocolate issued in the Swiss military
