= Cocoa production in São Tomé and Príncipe =

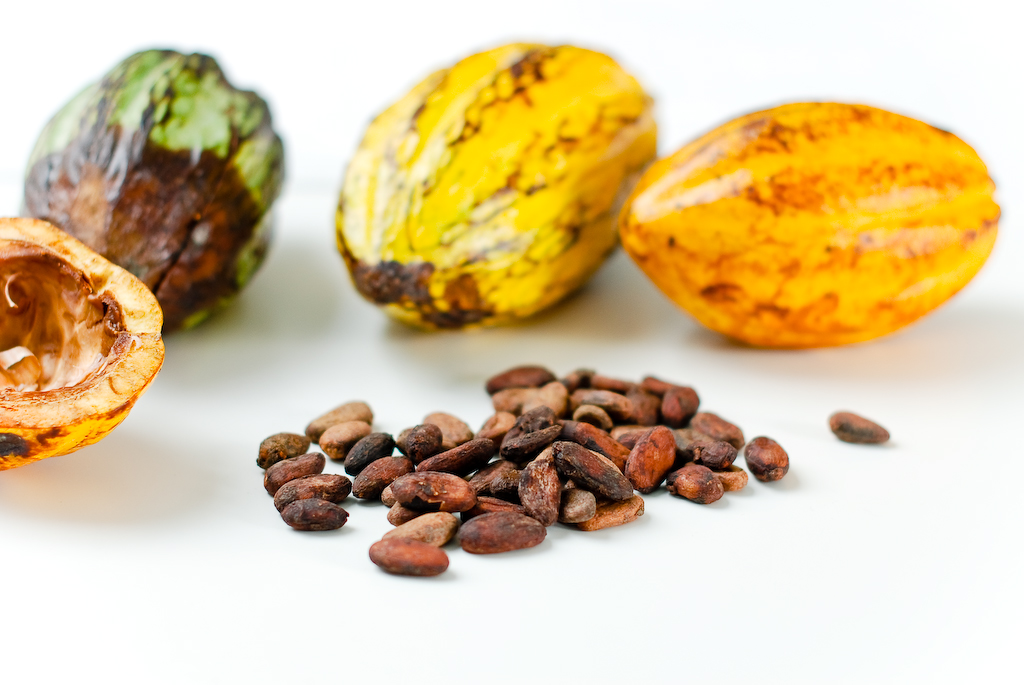
Cocoa beans from cocoa pods harvested in São Tomé and Príncipe

Cocoa is the primary cash crop of the African island country of São Tomé and Príncipe, accounting for 54% of its exports in 2021. The cocoa tree (Theobroma cacao) was introduced to the islands in 1819, when they were a Portuguese colony, and the first tree to fully grow was on Príncipe in 1824. São Tomé and Príncipe's equatorial climate provides an ideal environment for the growth of cocoa.

Historically, the volume of cocoa produced, and consequently the health of the São Toméan economy, has revolved around the global demand for chocolate. European demand for chocolate rose in the 19th century, when the Industrial Revolution transformed chocolate from an expensive and bitter drink to an affordable confectionery. At the same time, Portugal's loss of Brazil, a major source of agricultural exports including cocoa, prompted the Portuguese to shift their cocoa production to São Tomé and Príncipe. From 1905 to 1911, São Tomé and Príncipe produced and exported more cocoa than anywhere else in the world, earning it the nickname "the Chocolate Islands". However, the revelation of poor labour conditions on the islands by British journalists led to boycotts of São Toméan cocoa by European chocolate manufacturers, notably including Cadbury. Pests and government attempts to diversify the economy further diminished the cocoa supply throughout the 20th century.

A number of initiatives have been undertaken in the 21st century to revitalise cocoa production in São Tomé and Príncipe. São Toméan cocoa producers have gradually changed their focus to improving and promoting the quality of their product. Certified cocoa produced organically or through a fair trade process has become more widespread in the country.

== History ==
=== Introduction of cocoa and boom years ===
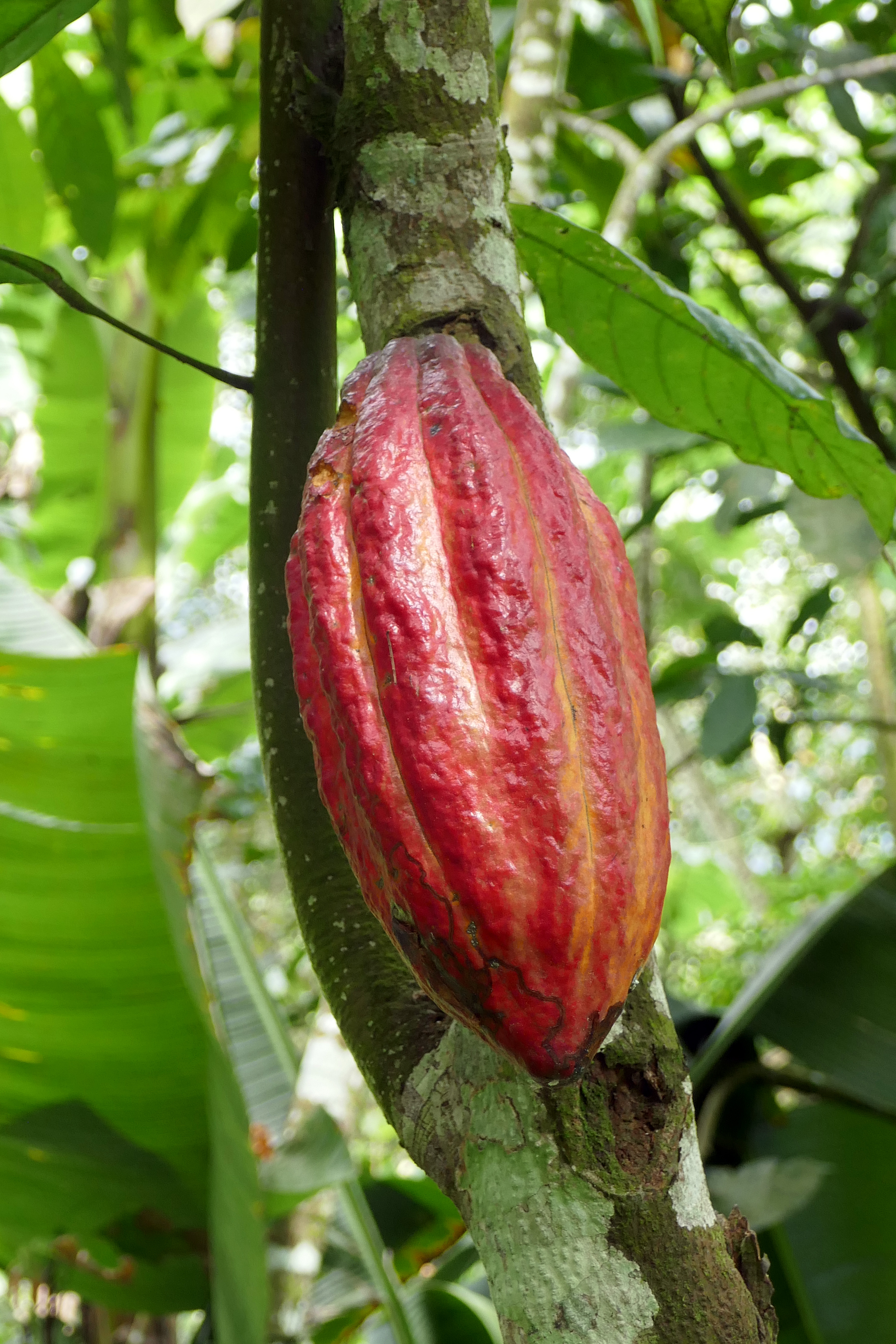
A ripe cocoa pod on a tree in eastern São Tomé Island

The cocoa tree was introduced to São Tomé and Príncipe by Portuguese colonial administrators seeking a profitable cash crop for their colony. The islands' forests were first cleared in the early 16th century for sugarcane plantations, and, through the use of slave labour, the colony became the largest producer of sugar in the world during this period. However, competition from the other Portuguese colony of Brazil diminished profits, and by the end of the century the colony's primary purpose had become to temporarily house African slaves being transported to the Americas. Hoping to generate more income from the colony, the colonial administrators introduced to the islands the coffee plant (Coffea) in 1780 and the cocoa tree in 1819. Cocoa tree seedlings were brought to São Tomé and Príncipe from Brazil, marking the arrival of cocoa in Africa. The first cocoa tree to fully grow in the colony was on the island of Príncipe, in 1824.

Cocoa proved to be a profitable crop, as global demand for it gradually increased throughout the century. The Industrial Revolution in Europe had, by the late 19th century, turned chocolate from an expensive and bitter drink to a cheap and affordable confectionery. At the same time, however, Portugal had gradually lost its colonial hold over Brazil, amid a global financial and moral shift away from slave labour. Portugal therefore moved its cocoa ambitions to its West African colonies, including São Tomé and Príncipe.

By 1905, São Tomé and Príncipe had become the world's top producer and exporter of cocoa, and the colony became known as "the Chocolate Islands". The United Kingdom's three largest chocolate makers at the time – J. S. Fry & Sons, Rowntree's, and the Cadbury Brothers – all sourced their cocoa primarily from São Tomé and Príncipe. São Tomé and Príncipe's cocoa production was overtaken by that of the British colony of the Gold Coast (present-day Ghana) in 1911.

==== Colonial-era trade practices ====
Portugal began imposing duties on cocoa exports from São Tomé and Príncipe in the late 19th century. The Portuguese government aimed to remedy its poor financial situation, which included fiscal deficits in other colonies, through revenue earned from São Tomé and Príncipe's wealthy elites. In 1882, Portugal introduced an export duty of 14 reis per kilogram on São Toméan cocoa. The export duty was reduced in 1892 to 12 reis per kilogram in São Tomé, amounting to an 8.5 per cent ad valorem tax, while Príncipe was granted duty-free exports for a decade. During this period, cocoa from São Tomé and Príncipe had to be shipped by a Portuguese ship to a Portuguese port, particularly the capital Lisbon, where most of it was re-exported with an additional tax.

São Toméan cocoa farmers complained when the duty was raised to 18 reis per kilogram in 1894, which was done by the Portuguese government to make up for a rural land tax that had rarely been collected. They argued that the 14 kilometres (8.7 miles) of railway, single short road, and basic iron quay they received in return were inadequate compensation. The Portuguese government planned to lower the duty to 13 reis per kilogram in 1912, but to offset the reduction, it would impose in Lisbon a new land tax and a cocoa re-export tax of 30 reis per kilogram. Lisboans protested the proposals, enraged by what they believed would become one of the highest tax burdens in the world.

Vertical integration grew in prominence within the São Toméan cocoa industry in the 1900s. Large landowners maintained ownership of their cocoa until the cocoa was, typically with the assistance of a broker, sold in the West. A dozen large plantations exported the majority of São Tomé and Príncipe's cocoa, but Portuguese traders also bought cocoa from smallholders. "Native brokers" bought cocoa only from African smallholders, and were often accused of purchasing cocoa stolen from plantations.

The owners of São Toméan cocoa plantations, who resided in Lisbon, made their first recorded attempt at artificially inflating global cocoa prices in 1898. They attempted to do so by withholding the cocoa supply, but their plans were abandoned as their crop was left to rot inside warehouses in Lisbon. A renewed attempt in 1901, amid a fall in cocoa prices, was successful, prompting São Toméan plantation owners to launch an even larger scheme in 1906. The owners obtained 600,000 British pounds from Portuguese banks to store 50,000 bags of cocoa in Lisbon, with the ultimate goal of maintaining a price floor on cocoa of one German mark to one kilogram. The scheme's initial success pushed the owners to invest even further, but competition from Brazilian, Ecuadorian, and other foreign cocoa exporters ruined the São Toméan cocoa cartel in 1908.

==== Colonial-era labour conditions ====
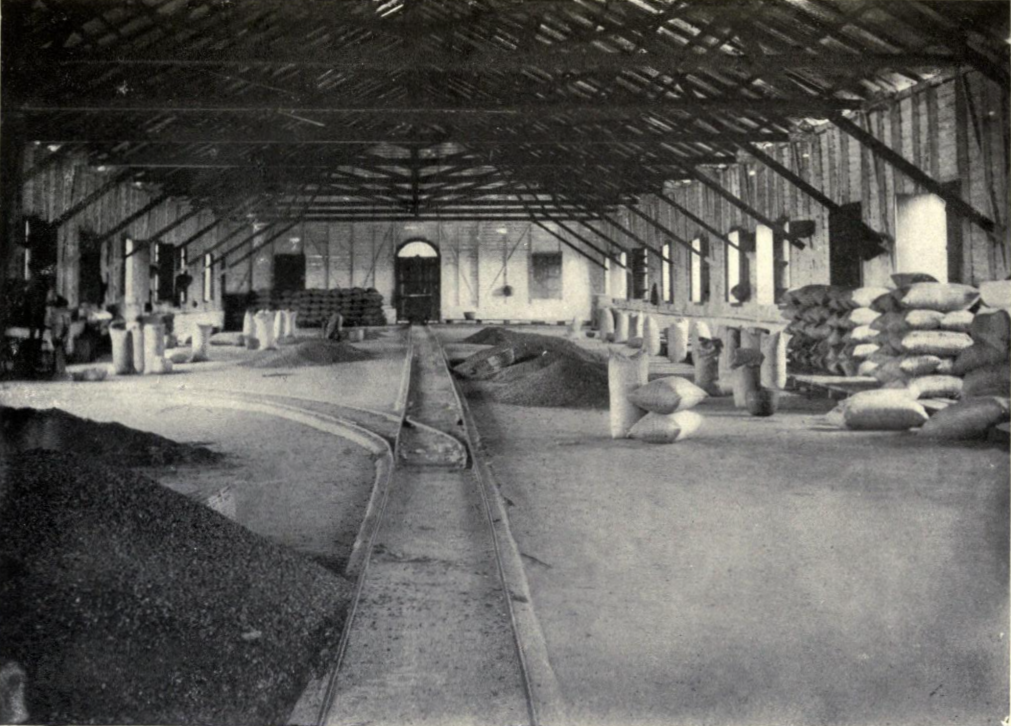
A shed in São Tomé where cocoa beans were stored and packed, c. 1912

Slave labour and indentured servitude were used to produce cocoa during the industry's period of growth and prosperity in São Tomé and Príncipe. In addition to cocoa trees, the Portuguese colonial authorities brought from Brazil to West Africa the exploitative labour practices they used on cocoa plantations. Portugal eventually abolished slavery in its colonies in 1869, when the United Kingdom and United States signed a treaty to jointly suppress the slave trade. However, Europeans and most Forros (freed slaves and their descendants) refused to work in the labour-intensive plantations, prompting Portugal to turn to the African mainland for a replacement labour force. Between 1888 and 1908, an estimated 67,000 Africans were hired to work on cocoa plantations in São Tomé and Príncipe; contemporary sources recorded a few cases of forced recruitment. Nearly all of the workers came from the three other Portuguese colonies in Africa – Angola, Mozambique, and Cape Verde. The workers became known as serviçias, contract labourers who earned low wages and possessed few rights.

Serviçias worked and lived in roças (English: /ˈrɒsəz/), large-scale plantations that functioned as self-sufficient company towns. Roças had chapels, hospitals, schools, stores, and workers' housing. These buildings were typically built around a plaza used for daily roll call and drying cocoa beans, among other activities. During the early 1900s, male serviçias received a monthly salary of around 2,500 reis (about US$2.50) per month, while female serviçias received just 1,800 reis. Because every store on the islands was company-owned, nearly all wages paid to the serviçias went back to the plantation owners. Alcoholism and tropical diseases, particularly malaria, were also widespread in the roças. In August 1906, Arthur Nightingale, who was investigating labour conditions in São Tomé and Príncipe for the British Foreign Office, submitted a report to his superiors in which he concluded that the "slaves had been renamed serviçias". Portugal, however, argued that there was no direct evidence of continued slavery on the islands.

=== Decline in production ===
São Toméan cocoa exports, 1921–1961 (select years)
Year	tonnes
1921	26,283
1926	12,470
1940	6,972
1954	7,415
1957	10,562
1961	9,234
Source: Seibert 2006, p. 88

By the 1910s, cocoa production in São Tomé and Príncipe had entered a steep decline due to European boycotts, infestations, and plant diseases. British activist-journalists like Henry Nevinson, who investigated and exposed the labour conditions of the roças, advocated a British boycott of São Toméan cocoa. Cadbury initially rejected the boycott proposals but ultimately started a boycott of São Toméan cocoa on 9 March 1909, after nearly a decade of protest. Cadbury's boycott was joined by other British chocolate manufacturers, as well as the German chocolate manufacturer Stollwerck. The global revelation of labour conditions on roças made it difficult for their owners to attract new workers and buyers. Insects, fungal diseases, and the swollen shoot virus destroyed poorly maintained fields of cocoa in the 1910s and 1920s. A plague of thrips in 1919 was particularly devastating to that year's cocoa harvest, more so than the European boycott. By 1935, most buildings and equipment in roças had been abandoned or repurposed to grow crops to sustain the islands' population. By the early 1940s, cocoa production per hectare had fallen well below that of other West African countries. Nonetheless, São Tomé and Príncipe continued to produce modest quantities of cocoa until its independence from Portugal on 12 July 1975.

The new government of independent São Tomé and Príncipe hoped to diversify the economy by nationalising the roças and centrally planning the production of cocoa. However, this caused a mass exodus of experienced managers, who were replaced by less knowledgeable government workers. As a result, between 1975 and 1987, cocoa production fell from 10,000 tonnes to 3,900 tonnes per year and many roças fell into disrepair or were abandoned altogether. A lack of investment in the industry, coupled with droughts, floods, and nutrient-depleted soils, exacerbated the decline. Financial assistance from the World Bank in the 1980s and a transition to a free market economy in 1990 failed to rejuvenate cocoa production on the islands. A 1998 slump in cocoa prices further reduced production, and by the turn of the century most cocoa farmers were producing the crop merely to maintain their property rights. São Tomé and Príncipe's leaders subsequently declared the end of the "era of cocoa".

=== Revitalization attempts ===
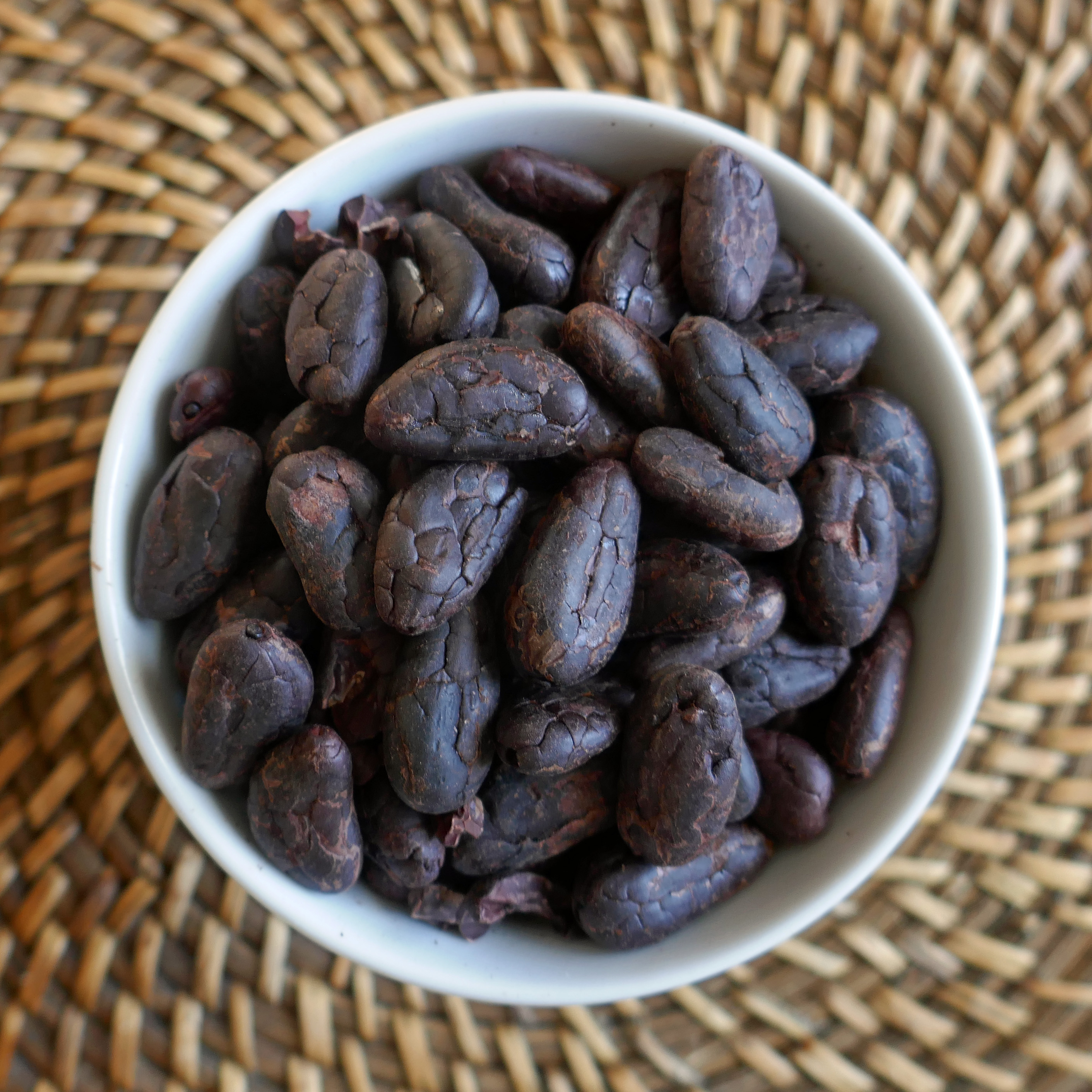
A cup of roasted cocoa beans, sold at a café in Mé-Zóchi District

São Toméan cocoa producers of the 21st century have gradually shifted their focus to promoting the quality of their product. Some cocoa farmers have oriented their operations towards eco-friendly cocoa, that is, cocoa grown without the use of fertilisers or herbicides. Others have produced fair trade cocoa with environmental sustainability in mind, for chocolate manufacturers such as Cadbury, Divine Chocolate, and François Pralus. Popular demand internationally for organic chocolate has also translated to a growing focus on São Toméan cocoa's organoleptic quality. In 2021, 30% of São Toméan cocoa was classified as "fine cocoa" (no defects) or "flavour cocoa" (few defects).

In 2019, the ecotourism and agroforestry company HBD Príncipe built a chocolate factory on the former site of Roça Sundy, once the second largest roça in Príncipe. The former residence of the plantation's owner was also transformed into a hotel.

== Growing regions ==
São Tomé and Príncipe's equatorial climate makes it a prime location for the growth of cocoa. The cocoa tree was first grown successfully on the island of Príncipe in 1824. A dormant volcano, Príncipe is particularly well-suited for the cocoa tree because of its volcanic soil. Cocoa plantations cover 25,000 hectares (62,000 acres) of the island of São Tomé, mainly in its northern and central areas.

== Production and export ==
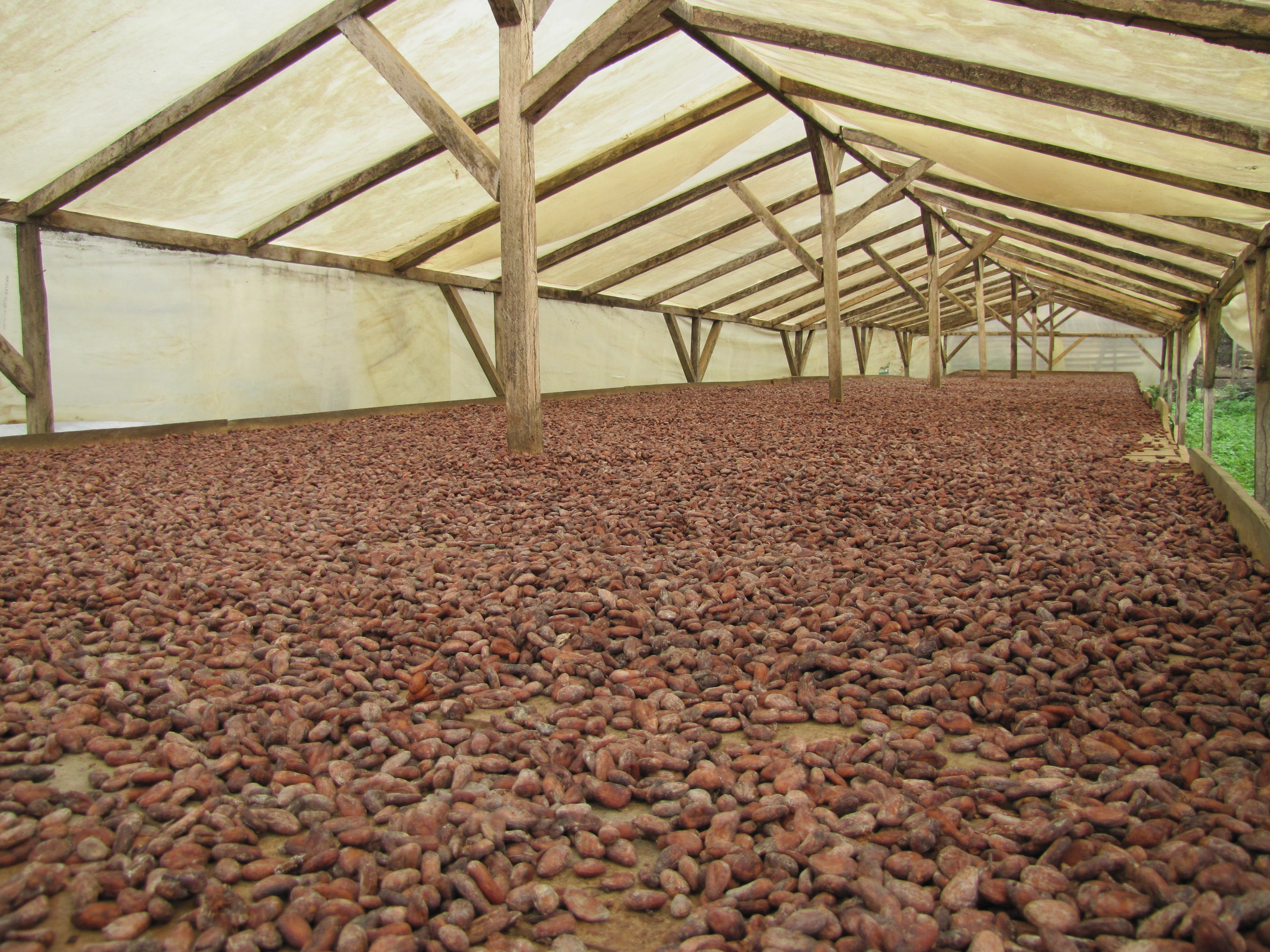
Cocoa beans inside a drying shelter, at a roça in Monte Forte

Cocoa is an integral part of the São Toméan economy, making up 54% of the country's exports in 2021. There are two systems of cocoa production in São Tomé and Príncipe: conventional cocoa, which is dependent on the prices set by the New York Stock Exchange; and certified cocoa, which is produced organically or through a fair trade process. The amount of cocoa produced in the country reached 3,550 tonnes in 2017, representing 0.1% of the global supply that year. This generated an estimated gross value added of 178 million dobras, or approximately 7.2 million euros at the time.

The country's largest cocoa producer is CECAB, short for the Cooperativa de Produção e Exportação de Cacau Biológico, or the "Organic Cocoa Production and Export Cooperative" in English. Founded in 2004, it is a cooperative of smallholders' associations that sell organic cocoa to Kaoka, a high-end, French chocolate manufacturer.

== National symbols ==
The significance of cocoa to São Tomé and Príncipe is reflected in its representation in the country's national symbols. According to the US Central Intelligence Agency's World Factbook, the yellow in São Tomé and Príncipe's national flag symbolises cocoa. Meanwhile, the national coat of arms contains a shield meant to resemble a cocoa pod.

Flag of São Tomé and Príncipe

Coat of arms of São Tomé and Príncipe

== See also ==
- List of countries by cocoa production
