= Organic Cocoa Production and Export Cooperative =

Cocoa producer in São Tomé and Príncipe

Coordinates: 0°23′26″N 6°37′46″E

- Trade name: CECAB
- Native name: Cooperativa de Produção e Exportação de Cacau Biológico
- Type: Cooperative
- Industry: Chocolate, cocoa production
- Founded: 20 July 2004; 22 years ago
- Headquarters: Rua Barão de Água Izé, São Tomé, São Tomé and Príncipe
- Website: www.cecab.st (in Portuguese)

The Organic Cocoa Production and Export Cooperative (Portuguese: Cooperativa de Produção e Exportação de Cacau Biológico, abbr. CECAB) (Note: Originally the Cooperativa de Exportação de Cacau Biológico, or "Organic Cocoa Export Cooperative" in English. The abbreviation "CECAB-STP" is used on the cooperative's website.) is a São Toméan cooperative of 42 smallholders' associations representing around 3,000 cocoa farmers. It is the largest cocoa producer in São Tomé and Príncipe. CECAB sells organic cocoa to Kaoka, a premium French chocolate manufacturer.

== Founding ==
Cocoa production in São Tomé and Príncipe has historically played a major role in the country's economy. However, by the turn of the 21st century, production had declined due to a lack of investment and environmental degradation.

Kaoka, a luxury chocolate manufacturer based in France, began buying cocoa from São Tomé and Príncipe in 2001. Kaoka encouraged local producers to form a cooperative to better coordinate their operations, and CECAB was consequently established on 20 July 2004.

== Activities ==
CECAB produces organic, fair trade cocoa and sells it to Kaoka. From 2014 to 2016, CECAB worked with Kaoka, the International Fund for Agricultural Development and the Global Environment Facility on a program to renovate cocoa plantations in São Tomé. The goal was to create alternative incomes to hunting, coal production, and illegal deforestation in Obô Natural Park. The partner organisations of CECAB praised the program's outcomes.

Cocoa theft from plantations has negatively affected the quantity and quality of CECAB's cocoa exports. CECAB President Aureliano Pires stated in May 2018 that the cooperative's losses from cocoa theft had reached 40 per cent of total production.

On 20 July 2022, CECAB opened a chocolate factory in the town of Guadalupe, in Lobata District, 12 kilometres (7.5 mi) north of the capital São Tomé. It was the third chocolate factory built in the country and the largest built by CECAB. Construction had begun two years earlier, with then São Toméan Prime Minister Jorge Bom Jesus laying down the first stone on 25 June 2020. The factory cost over 464,000 euros, split between CECAB (124,000 euros) and the African Development Bank (340,000 euros). Jorge Bom Jesus spoke at the inauguration ceremony, stating that his country was taking a "transformative path" towards "economic independence" by transitioning to the export of finished goods in addition to raw materials. He also commented: "We will export cocoa, we will export high quality chocolate – organic chocolate – and in return we will start to import ... technologies [and] equipment so that we may continue to improve the excellence of our services". Francisco Ramos, the country's then Minister of Agriculture, Fisheries and Rural Development, also attended the ceremony. In 2023, the factory was projected to have an annual output of 10 tonnes of chocolate.

== Membership ==
In 2023, CECAB's membership consisted of around 3,000 farmers from 42 smallholders' associations.
