= Raw chocolate =

Chocolate made from unroasted cocoa beans

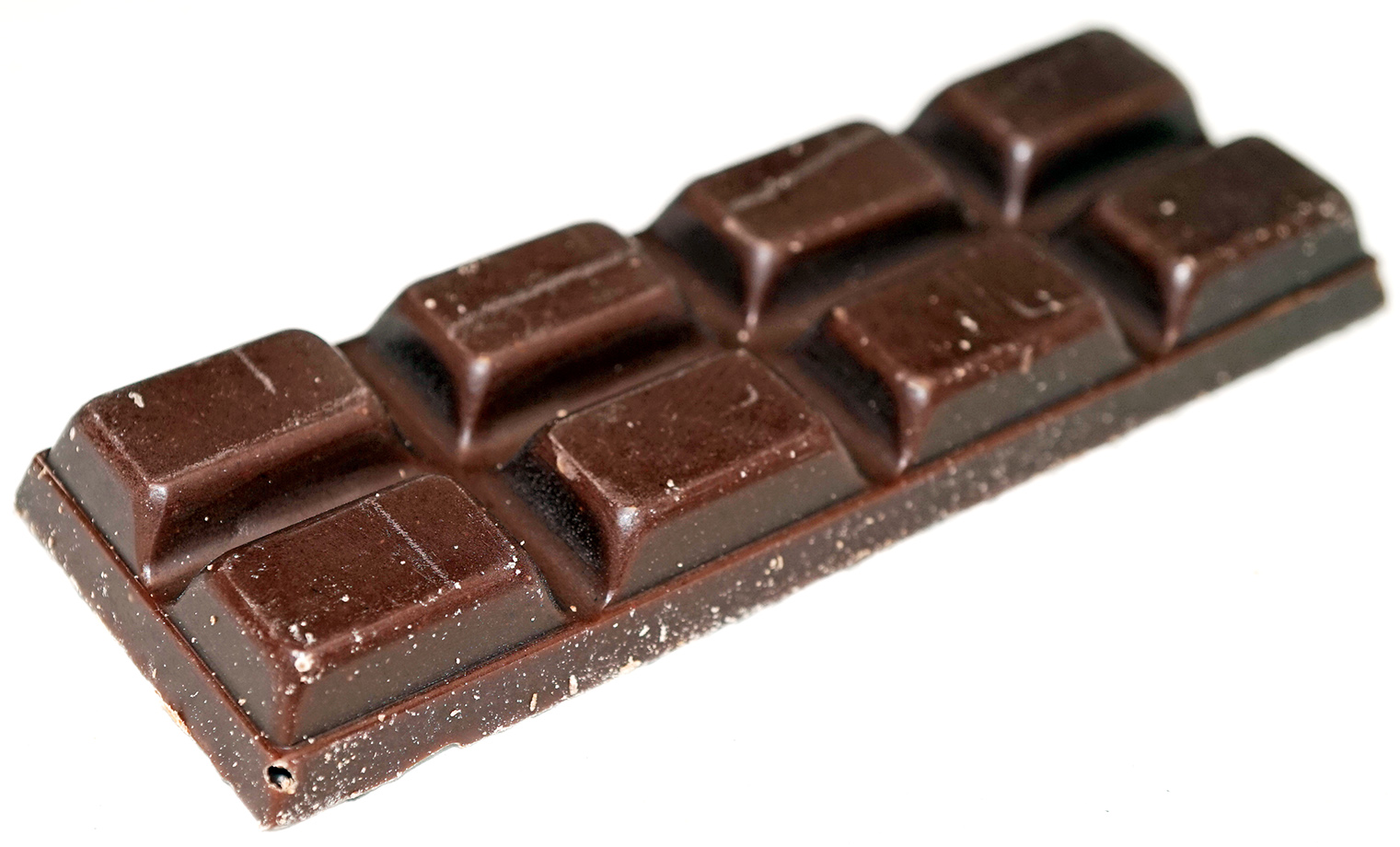
Raw chocolate

Raw chocolate (raw ground chocolate paste when ground) is chocolate produced from unroasted cacao beans with minimal processing.

== Production ==
Raw chocolate is produced from unroasted cocoa beans, sugar, and cocoa butter, and is characterized by the absence of roasting and strict temperature control during processing (not exceeding around 42 °C).

=== Process ===
The production process begins with the selection and preparation of cocoa beans, which are sorted, crushed, and separated from their shells to obtain cacao nibs. These nibs are then ground and refined, during which cocoa butter and sugar are gradually added to form a homogeneous chocolate mass.

The chocolate then undergoes extended grinding and conching, which may last several hours to days, allowing the particles to be reduced in size and the texture to become smooth. After this stage, the chocolate is left to mature, during which flavor develops further under controlled conditions.

The final stages include tempering, in which the chocolate is heated and cooled in a controlled manner to stabilize cocoa butter crystals, followed by molding and crystallization at low temperatures. The finished chocolate is then removed from molds and stored.

=== Food safety concerns ===
Some critics raise concerns about the potential for pathogenic bacteria contaminating raw chocolate (e.g., Salmonella) due to the absence of high temperatures used in production. Raw chocolate cannot be produced at temperatures exceeding 42 °C. In traditional chocolate manufacturing, cacao beans are exposed to high temperatures of up to 150 °C to kill Salmonella. Whether maximum temperatures of 42 °C are sufficient to eliminate bacteria is in dispute.

== History ==
Raw chocolate is a style of chocolate. Cacao has been consumed for millennia in Mesoamerica as beverages, ritual offerings, and a medium of exchange, but raw chocolate is not identical to its earlier forms of cacao use. Research on craft and bean-to-bar chocolate places this type of product within the broader late-20th century and early-21st century craft chocolate movement, emerging as a modern product category.

Similar to chocolate more broadly, raw chocolate remains part of the wider global cacao economy and agricultural supply systems shaped by colonial expansion, coercive labor, and unequal power structures.

== Sensory effects ==
The fermentation and drying process in the production of raw chocolate causes the unroasted cocoa beans to have a brown color, low acidity, and bitterness. The enzymatic and non-enzymatic reaction from the beans removes the acid and smoky flavor.

In a study compared to commercial chocolate, raw chocolate had lower carbohydrate content, higher total polyphenols, and more favorable appearance. Sensory evaluations found it to be more bitter and, as a result, less preferred in taste compared to commercial chocolate. However, it retained a smooth texture, as cocoa butter melts at body temperature, thus producing a characteristic favorable mouthfeel.

== Phytochemicals ==
Raw chocolate contains a mixture of polyphenols, including catechins, epicatechin, and procyanidins. Methylxanthines, such as theobromine, and caffeine are also present.

== See also ==
- Fair trade cocoa
- Dark chocolate
- Organic chocolate
- Raw foodism
- Types of chocolate
