= List of countries by cocoa production =

As of 2024, 57 countries produced cocoa beans, the main ingredient in chocolate, according to figures published by the Food and Agriculture Organization of the United Nations. Ivory Coast was the largest producer of cocoa by a significant margin, with 1,890,442 tonnes produced that year. This represented 36% of the global cocoa supply, a decrease from 42% the previous year.

== Table ==
The table below uses 2024 data from the Food and Agriculture Organization of the United Nations and lists countries with significant cocoa production.

Cocoa production by country (2024)
| Country | Tonnes |
|---|---|
| Ivory Coast (details) | 1,890,442 |
| Indonesia | 632,702 |
| Ghana (details) | 530,000 |
| Ecuador | 403,699 |
| Nigeria (details) | 350,000 |
| Cameroon | 320,000 |
| Brazil (details) | 297,509 |
| Peru | 157,253 |
| Sierra Leone | 93,750 |
| Colombia | 67,678 |
| Dominican Republic | 57,461 |
| Uganda | 55,000 |
| Democratic Republic of the Congo (details) | 50,000 |
| Papua New Guinea (details) | 45,000 |
| India | 30,388 |
| Liberia | 30,000 |
| Venezuela | 29,383 |
| Mexico | 28,448 |
| Togo | 25,000 |
| Guinea | 24,222 |
| Madagascar | 21,000 |
| Tanzania | 15,000 |
| Republic of the Congo | 15,000 |
| Guatemala | 11,701 |
| Philippines (details) | 10,844 |
| Bolivia | 5,825 |
| Solomon Islands | 4,200 |
| Sao Tome and Principe (details) | 4,000 |
| Haiti | 3,000 |
| Honduras | 2,000 |
| Vietnam | 1,500 |
| Vanuatu | 1,500 |
| Cuba | 1,463 |
| Sri Lanka | 1,150 |
| Costa Rica | 1,000 |
| Dominica | 1,000 |
| Equatorial Guinea | 600 |
| Guyana | 488 |
| Samoa (details) | 483 |
| Angola | 465 |
| Malaysia | 445 |
| El Salvador | 370 |
| Panama | 291 |
| Trinidad and Tobago | 231 |
| Saint Vincent and the Grenadines | 231 |
| Belize | 225 |
| Fiji | 216 |
| Grenada | 203 |
| Jamaica | 201 |
| Timor-Leste | 177 |
| Central African Republic | 136 |
| Thailand | 123 |
| Gabon | 100 |
| Comoros | 44 |
| Micronesia | 31 |
| Saint Lucia | 17 |
| Suriname | 5 |

== Small-scale production ==
Cocoa is also grown on a few small farms in Japan and Taiwan.
