= List of São Toméan flags =

This is a list of flags currently or historically used in São Tomé and Príncipe.

== Current ==
Flag of São Tomé and Príncipe (1975–present)

Flag of the Autonomous Region of Príncipe (2011–present)

== Historical ==
São Tomé and Príncipe flew the flag of Portugal during Portuguese colonial rule.

Flag of Portuguese São Tomé (1493–1495)

Flag of Portuguese São Tomé (1495–1521)

Flag of Portuguese São Tomé (1521–1578)

Flag of Portuguese São Tomé (1578–1640)

Flag of Portuguese São Tomé (1640–1667)

Flag of Portuguese São Tomé (1667–1706)

Flag of Portuguese São Tomé (1706–1750)

Flag of Portuguese São Tomé (1750–1816)

Flag of Portuguese São Tomé (1816–1826)

Flag of Portuguese São Tomé (1826–1834)

Flag of Portuguese São Tomé (1834–1910)

Flag of Portuguese São Tomé (1911–1975)

Flag of São Tomé city during the colonial era

== Proposed ==
Proposed flag of Portuguese colonial São Tomé (1932)

Proposed flag of Portuguese Provincial São Tomé (1965)

Proposed flag of São Tomé and Príncipe (1974) #1

Proposed flag of São Tomé and Príncipe (1974) #2

Proposed flag of São Tomé and Príncipe (1974) #3

Proposed flag of São Tomé and Príncipe (1974) #4

Proposed flag of São Tomé and Príncipe (1974) #5

Proposed flag of São Tomé and Príncipe (1974) #6

Proposed flag of São Tomé and Príncipe (1974) #7

Proposed flag of São Tomé and Príncipe (1974) #8
