= Flag of São Tomé and Príncipe =

Democratic Republic of São Tomé and Príncipe
- Use: National flag and ensign
- Proportion: 1:2
- Adopted: 12 July 1975; 51 years ago
- Design: A horizontal triband of green, yellow, and green, with a red isosceles triangle at the hoist and two five-pointed black stars on the yellow band
- Designed by: Manuel Pinto da Costa

The national flag of São Tomé and Príncipe is a horizontal triband of green, yellow, and green, with a red isosceles triangle at the hoist and two five-pointed black stars on the yellow band. The flag's aspect ratio is 1:2 and the ratio of the bands are 2:3:2. The flag was adopted upon São Tomé and Príncipe's independence from Portugal on 12 July 1975. The design is based on, and nearly identical to, the first flag of the Movement for the Liberation of São Tomé and Príncipe (MLSTP), which led the country to its independence.

== Design ==
The flag was designed by Manuel Pinto da Costa, the first president of São Tomé and Príncipe. It is almost identical to the MLSTP flag except that the widths of its bands are at a ratio of 2:3:2, while on the MLSTP flag they are equal. The flag's colours are shared by the flags initially adopted by two other former Portuguese colonies, Cape Verde and Guinea-Bissau, and all three feature a black star.

=== Symbolism ===
The colours and symbols of the flag carry cultural and political significance; however, sources differ on the specific meanings. The office of the São Toméan president gives the following significance to the flag's elements: green, yellow, and red are the Pan-African colours and represent the São Toméan independence movement; the triangle represents equality; and the two black stars represent the country's two eponymous islands, São Tomé and Príncipe. American vexillologist Whitney Smith attributes additional meaning to the flag; according to him, green represents the islands' lush vegetation, yellow represents the tropical sun, the red triangle represents equality and the independence movement, and the two black stars specifically represent the African population of the two islands. Meanwhile, the US Central Intelligence Agency's World Factbook states that yellow represents cocoa, a major agricultural export of the country.

=== Construction ===
The São Toméan government has specified sizes, colours, and manufacturing parameters in which the flag is to be made. The construction of the flag is outlined in Part I, Article 14 of the Constitution of São Tomé and Príncipe (2002 revision). The flag consists of three horizontal bands: two green bands of equal width at the top and bottom, and a yellow band in the middle that is one-and-a-half times the width of the green bands. The yellow band contains two five-pointed black stars. At the hoist is a red triangle whose height is equal to half of its base (an isosceles triangle).

Construction sheet of the flag of São Tomé and Príncipe

== Usage ==
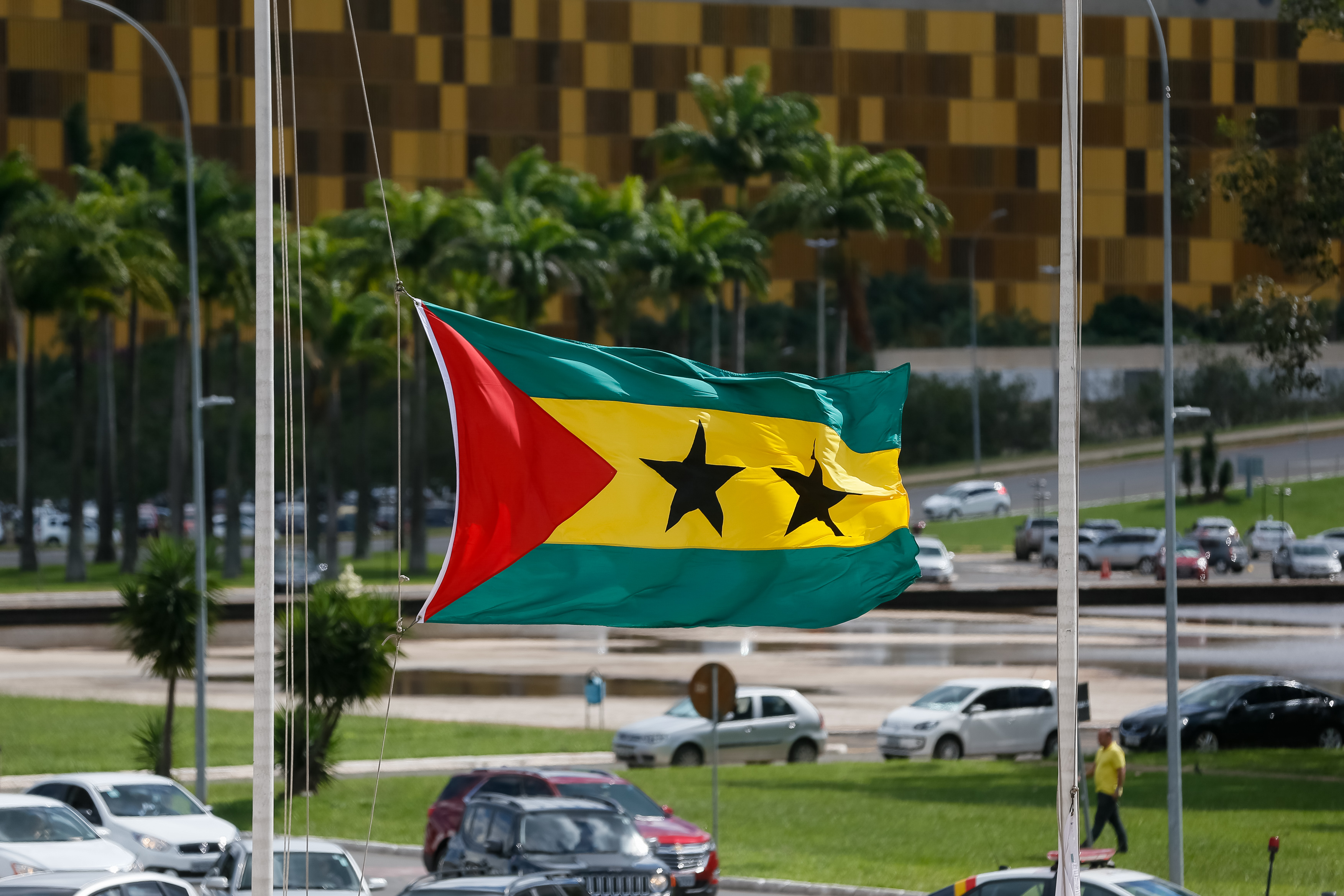
The flag flying at half-mast in Brasília, Brazil

=== Prohibition of desecration ===
According to Article 402 of the São Toméan penal code, publicly disrespecting or insulting the national flag or the flag of the Autonomous Region of Príncipe is punishable by up to two years in prison, or a daily fine for a maximum of 200 days.

=== Flag of convenience ===
The flag of São Tomé and Príncipe is one of many national flags flown as a flag of convenience by foreign merchant vessels. The São Toméan government encourages this practice because it brings in much-needed revenue to the country. Thirty-nine large ships were flying the flag in 2002, despite the fact that São Tomé and Príncipe does not have any deep-water ports for them to dock in. The São Toméan flag was previously on the Paris Blacklist of merchant flags for poor port state control, but it was removed in 2004 due to a lack of investigations being conducted on ships flying the flag. As of 2023, the flag remains off the blacklist.

== History ==
The Portuguese began colonising the then uninhabited islands of São Tomé and Príncipe in the 16th century. Four centuries later, the Batepá massacre in 1953 stoked nationalistic sentiment and galvanised a struggle for independence. The MLSTP was founded seven years later and remained underground until the Carnation Revolution in Portugal in 1974. The new Portuguese government recognised the MLSTP as the "sole and legitimate representative" of the São Toméan people, and the two parties negotiated a roadmap for São Toméan independence.

Eight designs for a São Toméan national flag were proposed and reviewed, all of which utilised the Pan-African colours. A modified version of the MLSTP flag, designed by the first São Toméan president Manuel Pinto da Costa, was ultimately chosen. It was adopted upon the independence of São Tomé and Príncipe on 12 July 1975.

1974 flag proposals for São Tomé and Príncipe
Proposal #1

Proposal #2

Proposal #3

Proposal #4

Proposal #5

Proposal #6

Proposal #7

Proposal #8

== See also ==
- List of São Toméan flags
- Coat of arms of São Tomé and Príncipe
