= Federal Specification for Candy and Chocolate Confections =

US standard for products made for use by the federal government

Candy and Chocolate Confections, Federal Specification Z-C-2104, is a document that defines and outlines requirements for candy and chocolates that the United States federal government may use, and further defines the conditions under which a new type of candy may be found suitable for use by government agencies. Specification Z-C-2104 was first enacted in 1979 by the Federal Supply Service, part of the Federal Acquisition Service, which in turn is part of the General Services Administration.

== Section 1: Scope and Classification ==
Section 1 of the Specification defines candies as falling into one of eight Types; candies are further grouped by distinctive features within each Type. Candies are additionally classified in one of five styles, which include bars, rolls, disks, pieces, and bags.

- Type I: Chocolate coated candy
- Type II: Starch jelly candies
- Type III: Caramel and Toffee
- Type IV: Lozenges, compressed, and peppermint
- Type V: Hard candy
- Type VI: Sugar, pan-coated confections
- Type VII: Enriched sweet chocolate with almonds, buttercrunch, or toffee
- Type VIII: Fudge bar, chocolate

== Section 2: Applicable documents ==
Section 2 of the Specification contains an extensive list of references to other federal regulations that may apply to candy. Such documents include, for example, Federal Specification L-C-110 (now depreciated), which specified the type of cellophane that may be used for preservative use. Other cross-referenced documents include Federal standards on food packaging, military specifications on labeling, United States Department of Agriculture requirements on quality of food items, and so forth.

== Section 3: Requirements ==
Section 3 of the Specifications define, in great detail, the process by which applicants may bid for candy supply contracts. Forty-five sub-subsections describe requirements for ingredients, quality, appearance, and dimensions of proposed candy.

== See also ==
- Outline of chocolate – Food produced from cacao seeds
