= Cocoa production in the Democratic Republic of the Congo =

Cocoa is grown as a cash crop in the Democratic Republic of the Congo (DRC), primarily in the eastern provinces of North Kivu and Ituri, with smaller operations in the country's west. The cocoa tree (Theobroma cacao) was introduced to the country in the late 19th century, but it was not until the 1920s and 1930s that cocoa plantations were established along the Congo River. Colonial-era production of cocoa peaked just before the DRC's independence in 1960 and stagnated afterwards.

The industry has seen a revival since 2007, with recent outputs surpassing colonial-era records. The Food and Agriculture Organization of the United Nations reported an output of 35,000 tonnes of cocoa from the DRC in 2023. However, Congolese cocoa farmers face disproportionately high levels of theft and violence, as most established plantations are located in conflict-ridden areas. Cocoa farming has also been linked to deforestation in the DRC.

== Introduction of cocoa and early history ==
The cocoa tree arrived in what is now the DRC in the late 19th century, when the country was privately controlled by Leopold II of Belgium as the Congo Free State. However, organised production did not begin until the 1920s and 1930s, when cocoa plantations were established along the Congo River. About 20,000 hectares (49,000 acres) of land, mostly in the western DRC, were set aside to grow cocoa. This grew to a peak of 25,000 hectares (62,000 acres) by the time of DRC's independence from Belgium in 1960. The industry's growth, however, halted after independence due to colonial plantation owners leaving the DRC.

== Production and export ==
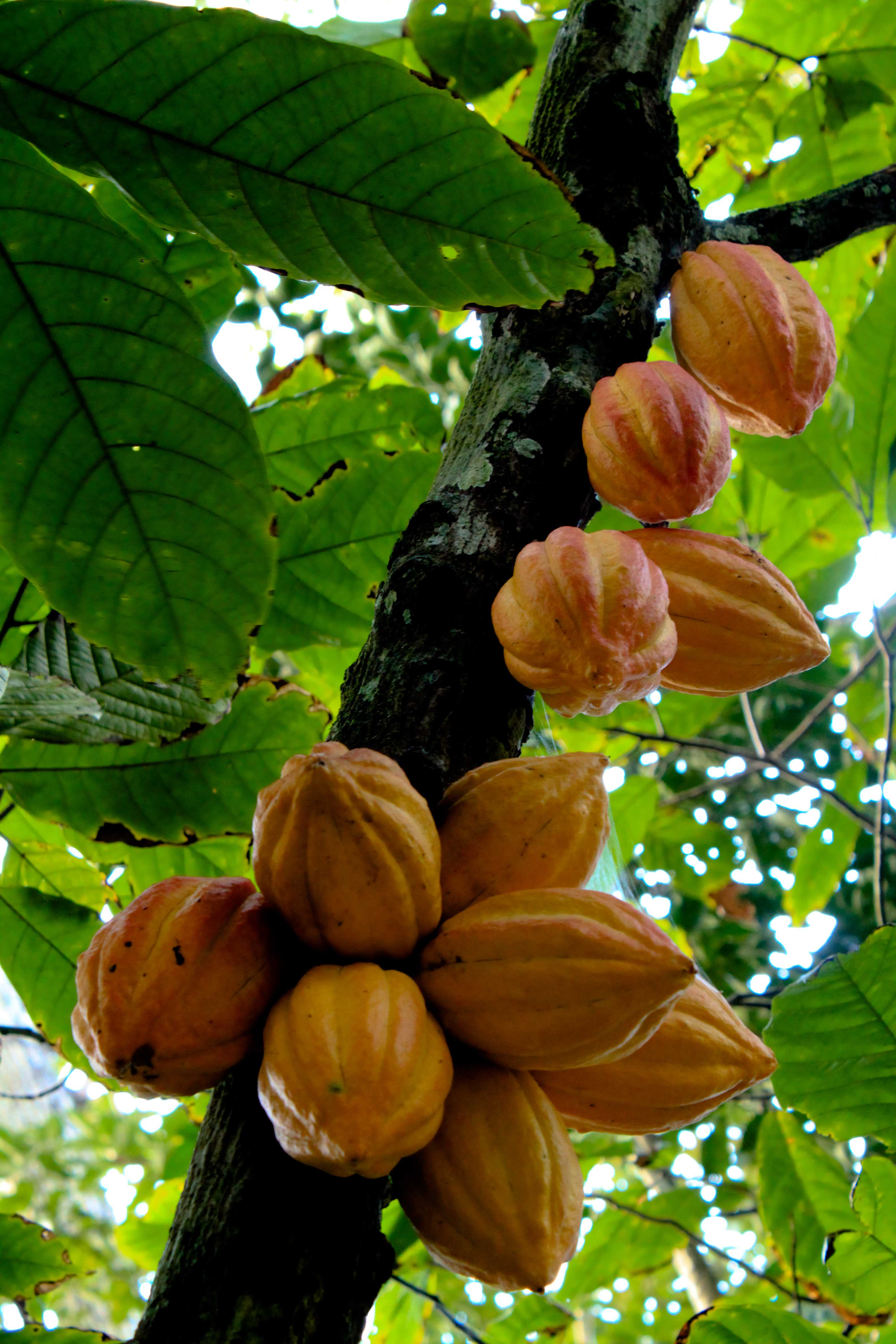
Cocoa pods on a Forastero tree

In the DRC, cocoa is grown primarily in the eastern provinces of North Kivu and Ituri. Beni in North Kivu is particularly suited for cocoa cultivation because of its fertile soil. There are also surviving colonial-era plantations in western provinces such as Équateur. Most cocoa harvested in the DRC comes from Forastero trees, with smaller quantities from Trinitario trees.

Cocoa exports have grown significantly since attempts at reviving the industry began around 2007. The DRC exported only 600 tonnes of cocoa in 2000; this number grew to 10,000 tonnes by 2015 and 63,971 tonnes (a value of US$144.5 million) by 2023. Additionally, Al Jazeera reported in 2024 that a growing number of Congolese coffee farmers had switched to cocoa, which has the same growth period as coffee but requires less maintenance and can fetch higher prices.

Limited chocolate production has also emerged in the DRC. For example, conservationists at Virunga National Park sold chocolate gorillas to celebrate its centenary in 2025, with all profits going towards conservation efforts. The chocolate gorillas were made by local chocolatiers from cocoa grown near the park.

== Challenges ==
=== Armed conflict ===
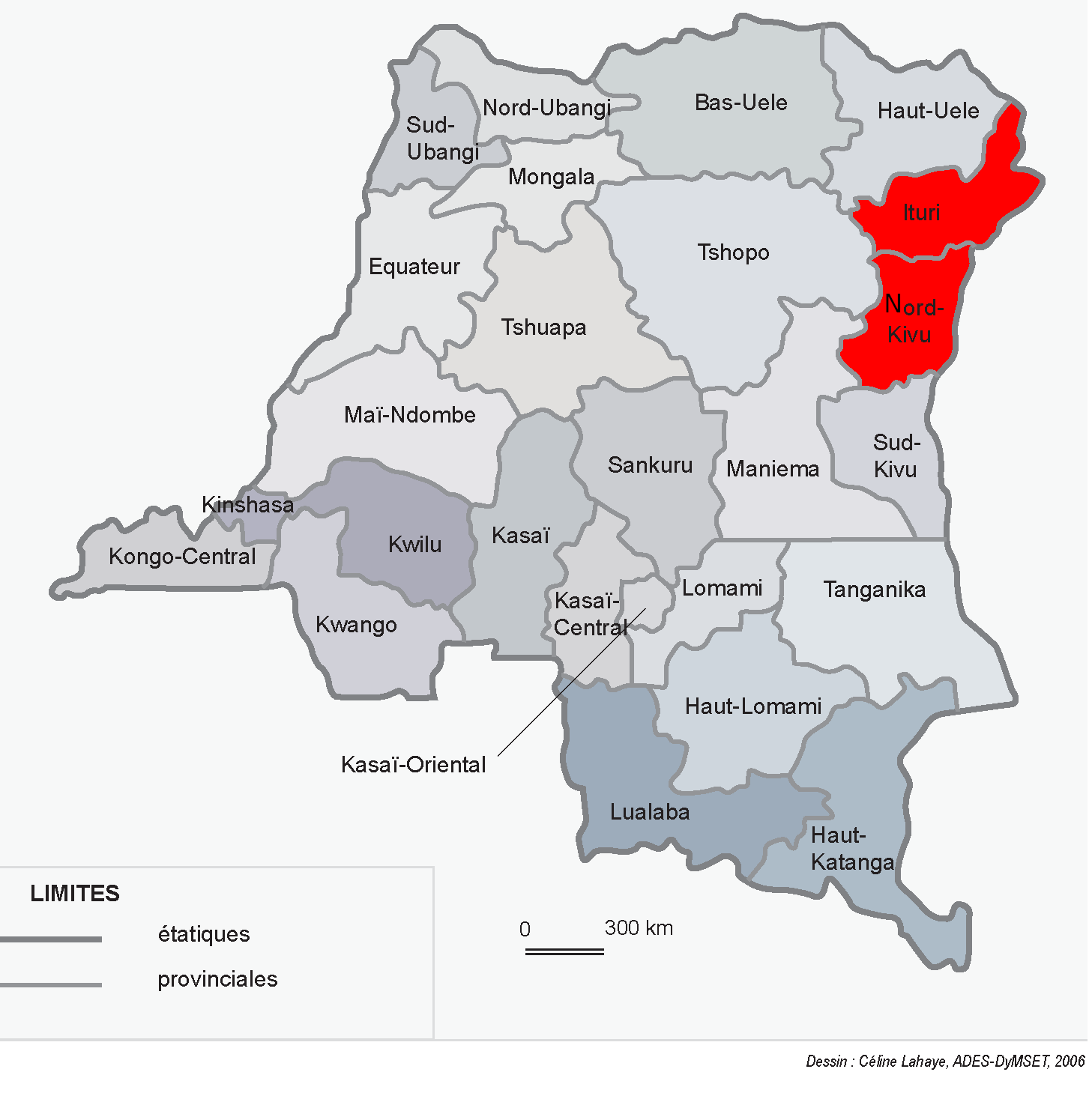
Map of the Democratic Republic of the Congo with North Kivu and Ituri highlighted in red

The DRC's two main cocoa-growing provinces, North Kivu and Ituri, have experienced decades of ethnic and religious violence, as well as armed conflict over control of resources. Before the 2000s, cocoa farmers faced raids from the sangabalende, criminal groups that specialised in cocoa theft. The activities of the sangabalende have since been supplanted by those of the Allied Democratic Forces (ADF), an Islamist militant group. A number of cocoa farmers in North Kivu have been killed by the ADF, with survivors also blaming other rebel groups and the armed forces of the DRC (FARDC). FARDC soldiers sent by the government to protect farmers from the ADF have been accused of levying additional taxes on cocoa and stealing from abandoned plantations. Ugandan soldiers operating alongside the FARDC provide additional security, but Congolese cocoa farmers have accused Ugandan buyers of leveraging the Ugandan soldiers' presence to impose prices set by Uganda and export their crop as Ugandan cocoa.

Violence in North Kivu and Ituri has also jeopardised the certified status of cocoa in the DRC, most of which is double-certified as organic and UTZ-compliant. In early 2025, the European Union warned it may revoke its recognition of certified labels on Congolese cocoa because its inspectors could not safely work in the conflict-affected region.

=== Environmental impact ===
Large swathes of the Congo Basin have been deforested for cocoa plantations. Researchers have compared cocoa-driven deforestation in the DRC to that in West Africa, where it is a significant issue. Researchers have also suggested that higher cocoa prices driven by the ongoing cocoa crisis may exacerbate the problem.
