= Chocolataire =

Social gathering featuring chocolate

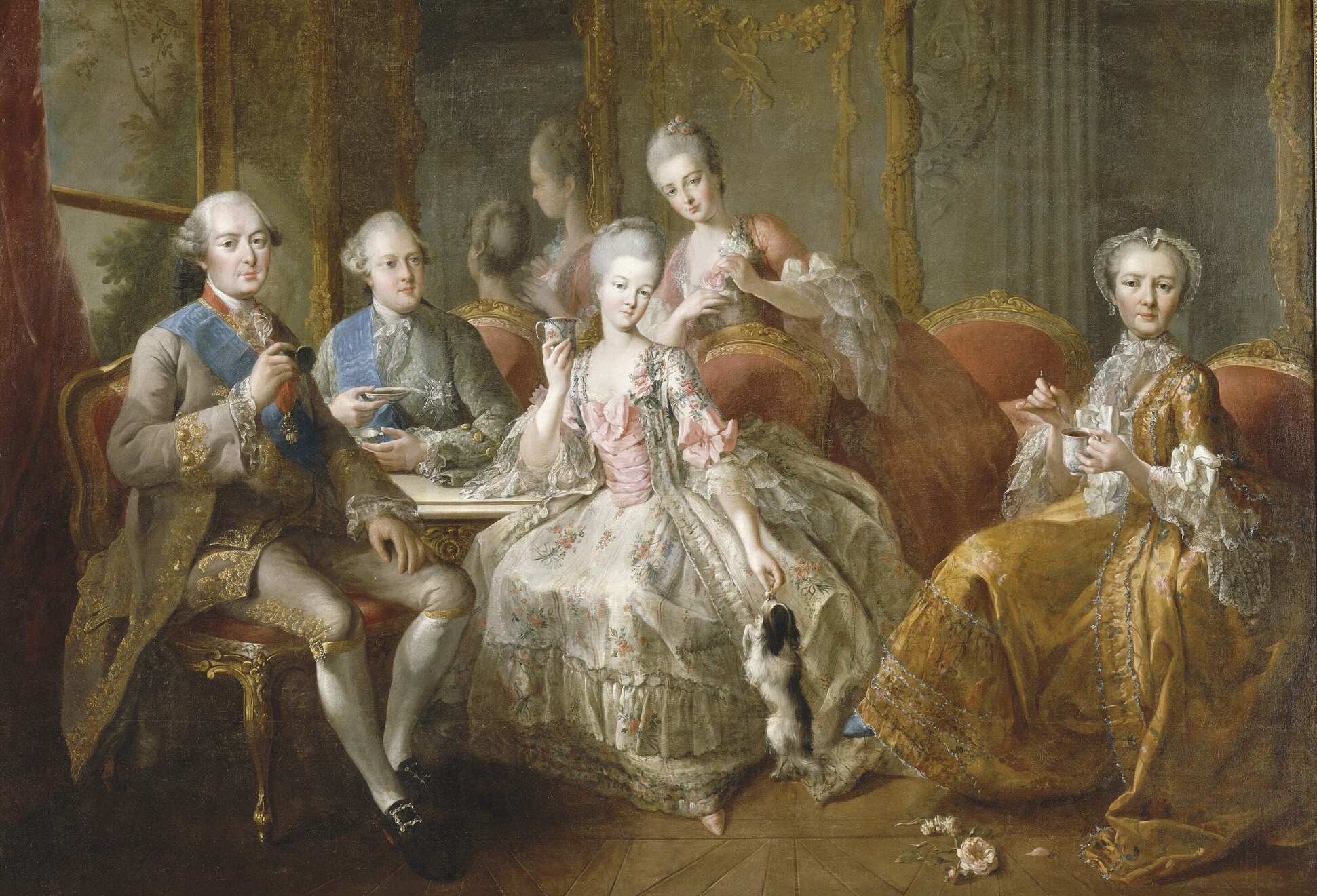
Chocolate at a social function, 1768 painting

A chocolataire was a type of social gathering that ranged from large scale events (such as fund raising and invitation only) to smaller functions (similar in structure to informal tea parties), in which all food and drink are composed of or contain some form of chocolate. It developed as the process for making milk chocolate came to market in 1875. Chocolataires were seen as a novel alternative to other forms of social gathering at the time.

== Food and drink ==
The menu at a chocolataire may include any variety of chocolate-based dishes: cakes, wafers, bonbons, candy, and pastry being a few examples thereof. These dishes can also be seasonal. Examples of seasonal dishes can include hot chocolate and chocolate fondue during cold months and chocolate lemonade or chocolate ice cream during the summer.

== Ceremony ==
As the chocolataire grew in popularity, the ceremony itself became more chocolate-themed—the menu cards, programs, decorations, and even the costumes of the waiters were of chocolate color; chocolate cups and saucers were sometimes sold with the chocolate that was served in them, or given as a souvenir for those who purchased chocolate.

The chocolataire saw use in every social gathering imaginable—one was even thrown as part of a fund raising function for a kindergarten in Indiana—and it was not uncommon, after all guests had been served, to hold an auction of remaining candy, loaves of cake, and boxes of chocolate left over from preparation of the dishes.
