= Cocoa production in Sri Lanka =

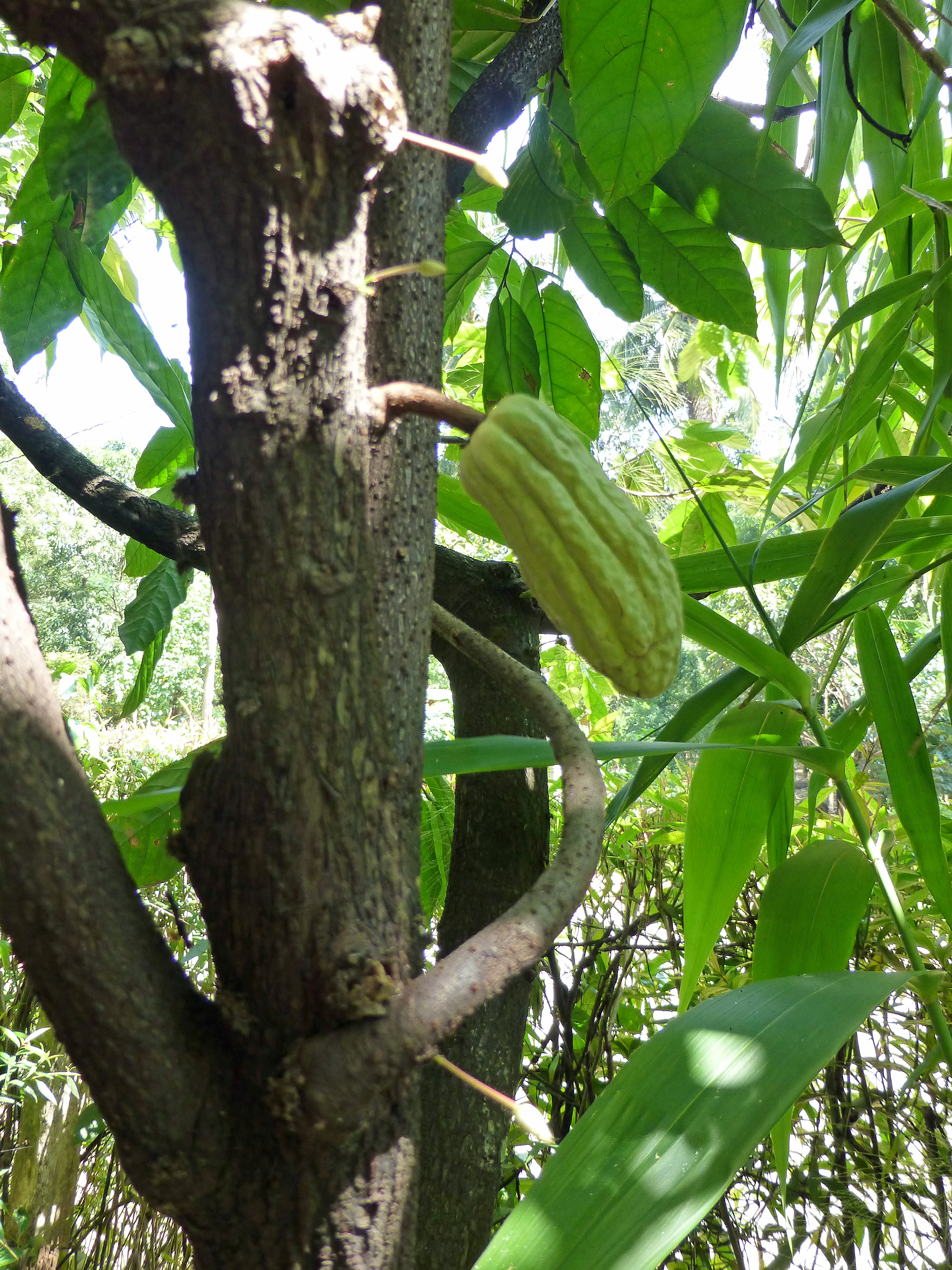
Cacao growing in Sri Lanka

Cocoa (Theobroma cacao) production contributes to the national economy of Sri Lanka. It is grown in fairly dense shade and generally cultivated under coconut and rubber. Although cocoa production remains a source of revenue, it is no longer a main economic sector. The great part of cocoa cultivation occurs in the Matale, Kandy, Badulla, Kurunegala, Kegalle and Monaragala districts. The first cocoa plants were introduced to the country in 1819. Recent years cocoa production has increased by nearly $22.6 million (2015).

In 2019, the country ranked 30th of the largest cocoa producers in the world. Cocoa production was at 1,499 t (1,475 long tons; 1,652 short tons) from an area of 2,000 ha (4,900 acres), at a yield rate of 7,499 hg/ha (10,705 oz/acre). In other lands shade crop such as Dadap are used. Out of two cocoa varieties, viz. Forastero and Criollo, the former is more widely grown although the quality of Criollo is better.

Cocoa was introduced to Ceylon around 1834 from Trinidad, by the Ceylon governor Robert Wilmot-Horton and for decades, production remained limited. Annual exports increased dramatically in the years between 1875 and 1914, going from half a ton to 3,500. As of 1960, cultivation reached around 12,000 ha (30,000 acres). Cocoa is mostly cultivated in the Central, Uva, North Central and Sabaragamuwa Provinces. Around the 300 plants per acre could be planted at a spacing of 250 mm × 360 mm (10 in × 14 in). Cocoa can be picked from the fourth year. The main crop is obtained from October to January, with a smaller crop in May to July. Yields vary from 100–200 kg (220–440 lb) per ha under the heavy shade. With minimum shade, the yield could go up to 500 kg/ha (450 lb/acre). A number of diseases, viz. stem canker, pod-rot and swollen shoot tend to decrease yields. The helopeltis bug is the most serious pest and it attacks the pods causing a considerable yield loss.

== Gallery ==
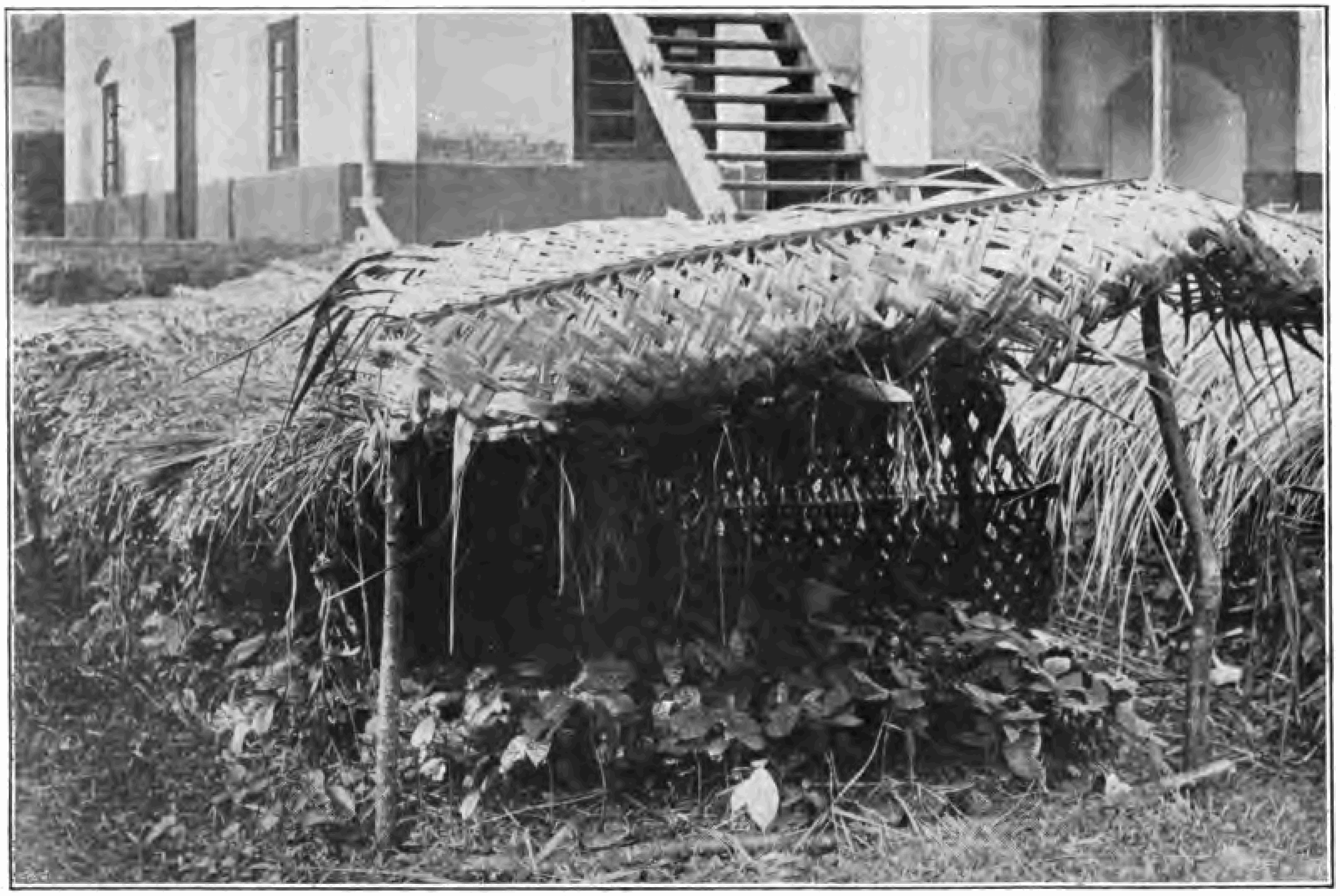
Baskets of cacao seedlings nursery, circa 1900

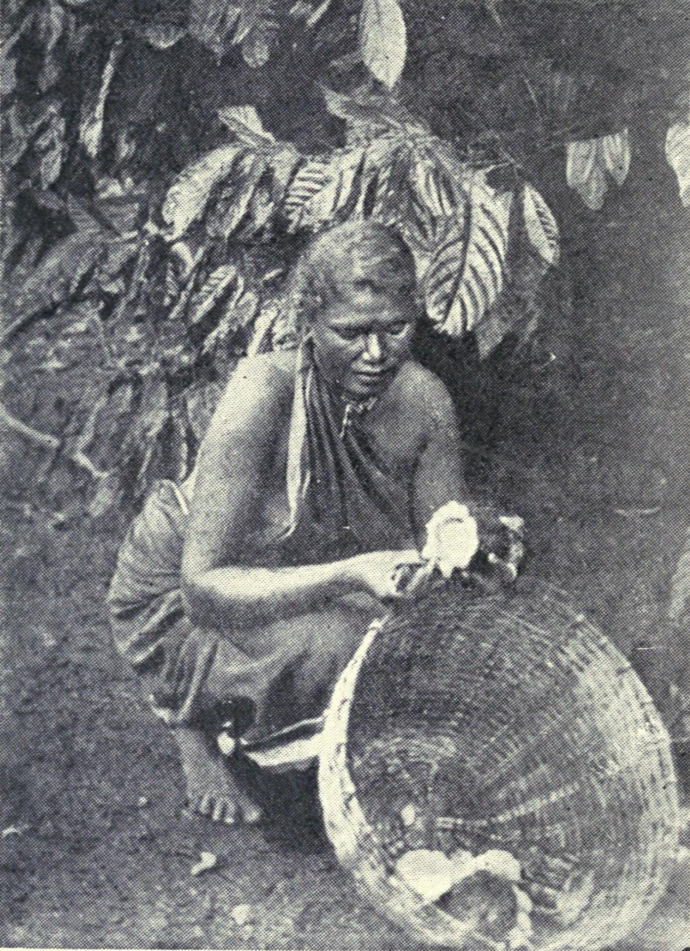
Sri Lankan woman splitting a cocoa pod, circa 1920

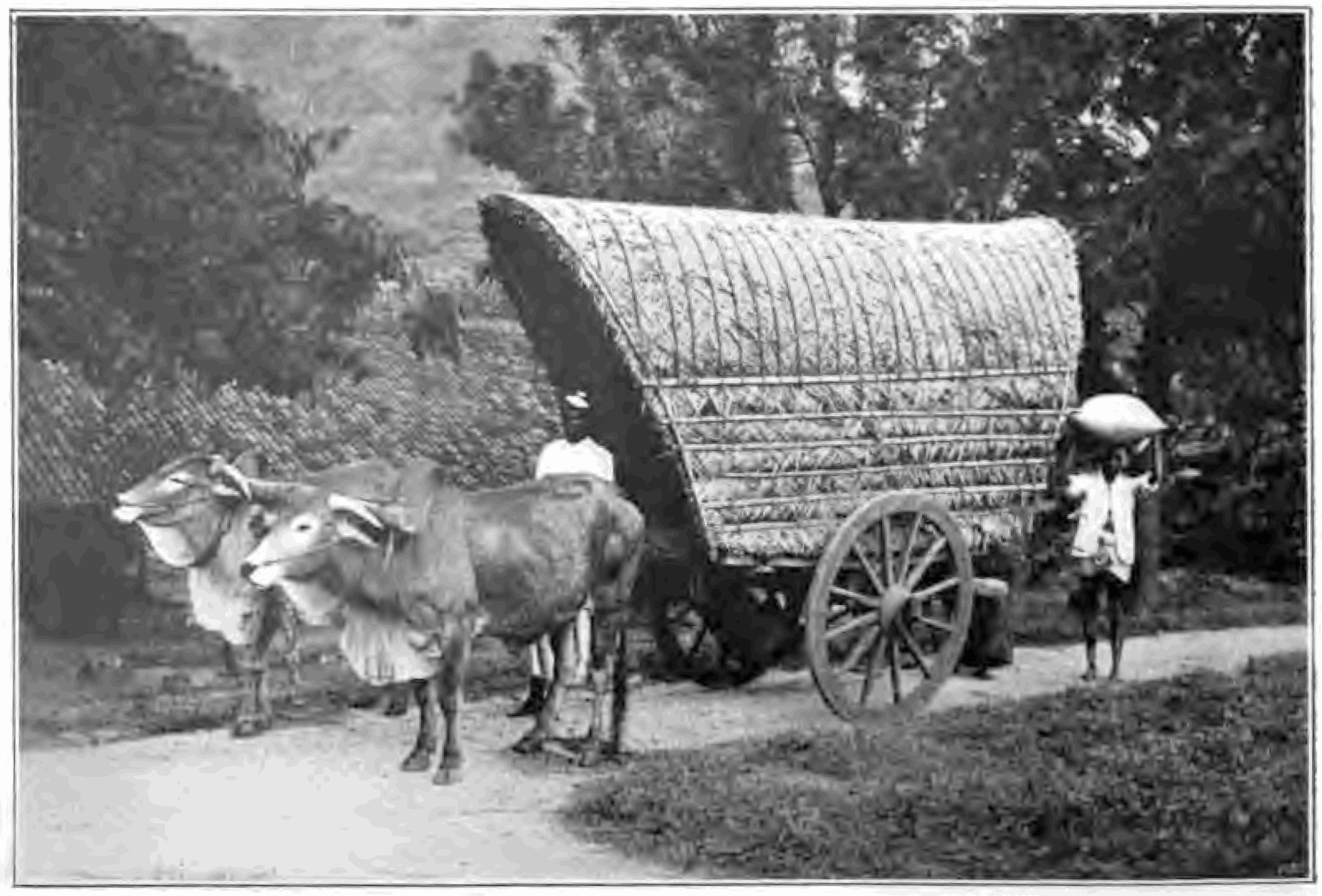
Transporting cocoa to rail, circa 1900
