= Coat of arms of São Tomé and Príncipe =

- Armiger: Democratic Republic of São Tomé and Príncipe
- Adopted: 12 July 1975; 51 years ago
- Crest: A mullet of five points azure
- Torse: Vert and azure
- Shield: Or, a palm eradicated proper
- Supporters: A peregrine falcon dexter and a grey parrot sinister, both proper
- Motto: Unidade, Disciplina, Trabalho (English: "Unity, Discipline, Work")

The coat of arms of São Tomé and Príncipe is the heraldic emblem of São Tomé and Príncipe, an island country located off the western coast of Central Africa. It consists of a peregrine falcon on the left and a grey parrot on the right holding a cocoa pod–shaped shield with a palm in its center. The height of the shield is one-third greater than its width. The shield is surmounted by a blue star, and above it there is a band that states the official name of the country in Portuguese. The national motto – "Unity, discipline, work" – is inscribed in Portuguese at the base of the arms.

== History ==
In 1935, the colonies of the Portuguese Empire were officially assigned coats of arms that followed a standard design pattern. São Tomé and Príncipe went through three different coats of arms during the Portuguese colonial period.

Coats of arms of Portuguese São Tomé and Príncipe (1933–1975)
Provisional coat of arms between 1933 and 8 May 1935

Coat of arms between 8 May 1935 and 11 June 1951

Coat of arms between 11 June 1951 and 12 July 1975

Lesser coat of arms between 8 May 1935 and 12 July 1975

Upon its independence from Portugal on 12 July 1975, São Tomé and Príncipe adopted its current coat of arms alongside its national flag and national anthem.
