= Organic chocolate =

Certified-organic chocolate

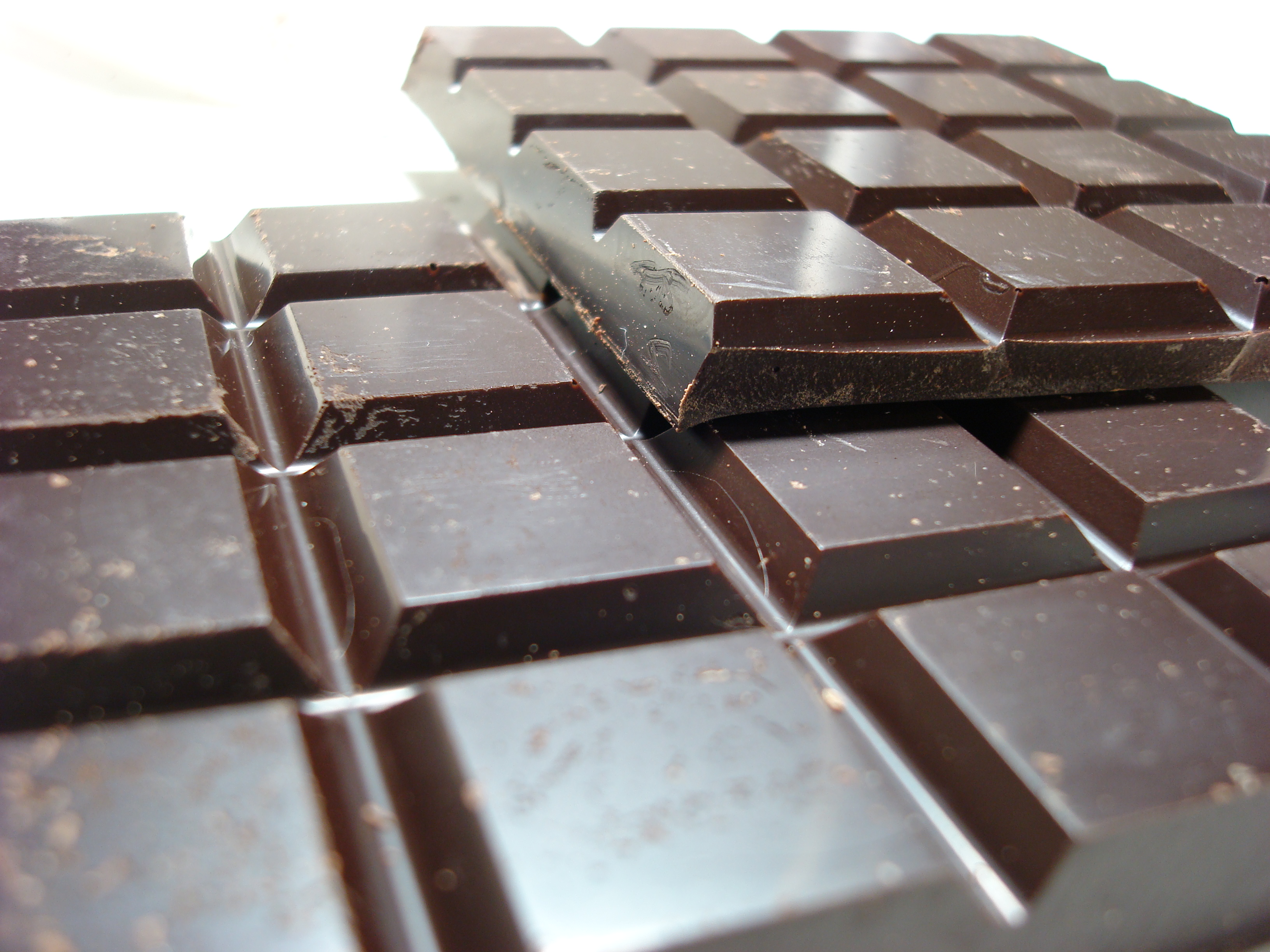
Organic dark chocolate with 72% cocoa content

Organic chocolate is chocolate made from cocoa beans, cane sugar, and sometimes milk that have been produced in accordance with organic agriculture standards. These standards are legally regulated rules governing how organic food is grown, harvested, processed, and handled. Typical requirements include restrictions on the use of synthetic fertilizers, pesticides, and antibiotics; specified feed, housing, and breeding requirements for livestock; a prohibition on genetically engineered seeds; and regular on-site inspections. To retain organic certification, producers are periodically inspected by an independent certifying body. As of 2016, organic chocolate was a growing sector in the global chocolate industry. Organic chocolate is a socially desirable product for some consumers.

== Organic Certification process ==
Organic chocolate is produced under specifc agricultural and processing standards that govern how its ingredients are grown and processed. Conventional chocolate manufacturing includes the use of pesticides and soil conditioners to increase production, quality, and yield of their product. In Canada, organic products are overseen by the Canadian Food Inspection Agency (CFIA) and can not be sold as organic unless they meet the specific requirements. Under the program, land used to grow organic cocoa must have had no prohibited substances applied for at least three years before harvest. Anything prior to this time stamp must be marked as “in transition”, rather than "organic". All growth and processing methods are heavily regulated in production to ensure the environmental standards are met. In the United States, producers who seek organic certification apply to a certifying agent accredited by the National Organic Program (NOP). During the transition to organic production, growers may adopt new cultivation methods, experience lower yields, and sell their cocoa at conventional prices..

For small cocoa producers in São Tomé, the fees and other costs associated with organic certification can be a barrier to obtaining certification. These organic chocolate practices are influenced by stakeholders in the chain of command. For smaller businesses, the costs to maintain sustainable and organic products creates a high financial strain. Certain suppliers will use word such as “natural” and “environmentally safe” without necessarily meeting the organic certification requirements..

== Health and environmental concerns of farmers ==
Some cocoa farmers have reported that exposure to agricultural chemicals is associated with health problems later in life. Pesticides sprayed on farms can also leach into groundwater, affecting freshwater sources, and some chemicals also bioaccumulate through the food chain. Cocoa farmers interviewed by Obeng reported health concerns that they attributed to exposure to agricultural chemicals.

== Consumer Interest ==
Trends show that demand has grown for cocoa beans and chocolate products with certifications, including the organic certification. Organic food production is increasing on all continents, and oftentimes governments are even encouraging consumers to buy organic. Studies of organic food consumers have reasoned that health concerns, taste preferences, and environmental considerations are the reason they choose to purchase organic products With greater food production visibility at the beginning of the century and the outbreak of “food scares” in multiple countries, people became more knowledgable on the risks in food production, and therefore more cognizant of the food they are purchasing and consuming. The primary reason for purchasing organic food was health concerns, which is important to note when people purchase groceries. Along with health reasons that encourage the purchase of organic food, people also lean towards organic food for social reasons. Social factors have also been identified as a motivation for buying organic products. Purchasing locally grown, organic groceries directly supports local farmers, and this profit encourages farmers to continue producing organic food.

== Fair Trade vs. Organic Labels ==
Some people tend to confuse the differences between fair-trade and organic labels. Fair trade concerns the wage paid towards costs of production and living, so if workers are paid a liveable wage and are in safe working conditions, it's considered fair trade. However, in order for chocolate to be considered organic, it needs to follow a set of requirements that focus on the use of fertilization, engineered seeds, written records of production and sales, and regular on-site inspections. Although fair trade and organic are not the same thing, around 65–85% of fair trade products are also organic certified. As the organic market has evolved, so has the interest of fair trade within the production of the products. Consumers who look for the organic label also judge the product by the social and environmental implications of it. Ultimately, these two labels are not the same, but they do oftentimes appear hand-in-hand.

== See also ==
- Raw chocolate
- Environmental impact of cocoa production
- Fair trade cocoa
- Tropical rainforest conservation
- Types of chocolate
