= Environmental impact of cocoa production =

The environmental impact of cocoa production includes deforestation, soil contamination, and herbicide resistance. The majority of cocoa farms are now located in Ivory Coast and Ghana.

== Background ==
Cocoa beans are a high demand consumer item all over the world. They are used in products such as chocolate, candy bars, drinks and cocoa powder. However, cocoa farming and the production of cocoa beans are extremely fragile and labour-intensive processes. The cocoa trees are also called Cacao trees. The process begins with a Cacao plant, or Theobroma cacao, in which the beans are extracted from pods that grow directly on the cocoa trees branches. Each pod contains roughly 30 to 50 beans. After the beans are extracted they must go through a time-consuming process of natural fermenting and drying. The farming process of cocoa can damage the environment depending on the practices of the farmer, as well as be limited by the environment itself. Global Climate Change, for example, causes longer drought seasons making it more difficult for farmers to plant and sustain new Cacao trees. Most of the environmental impact comes from carbon dioxide emissions.

== Process of farming ==
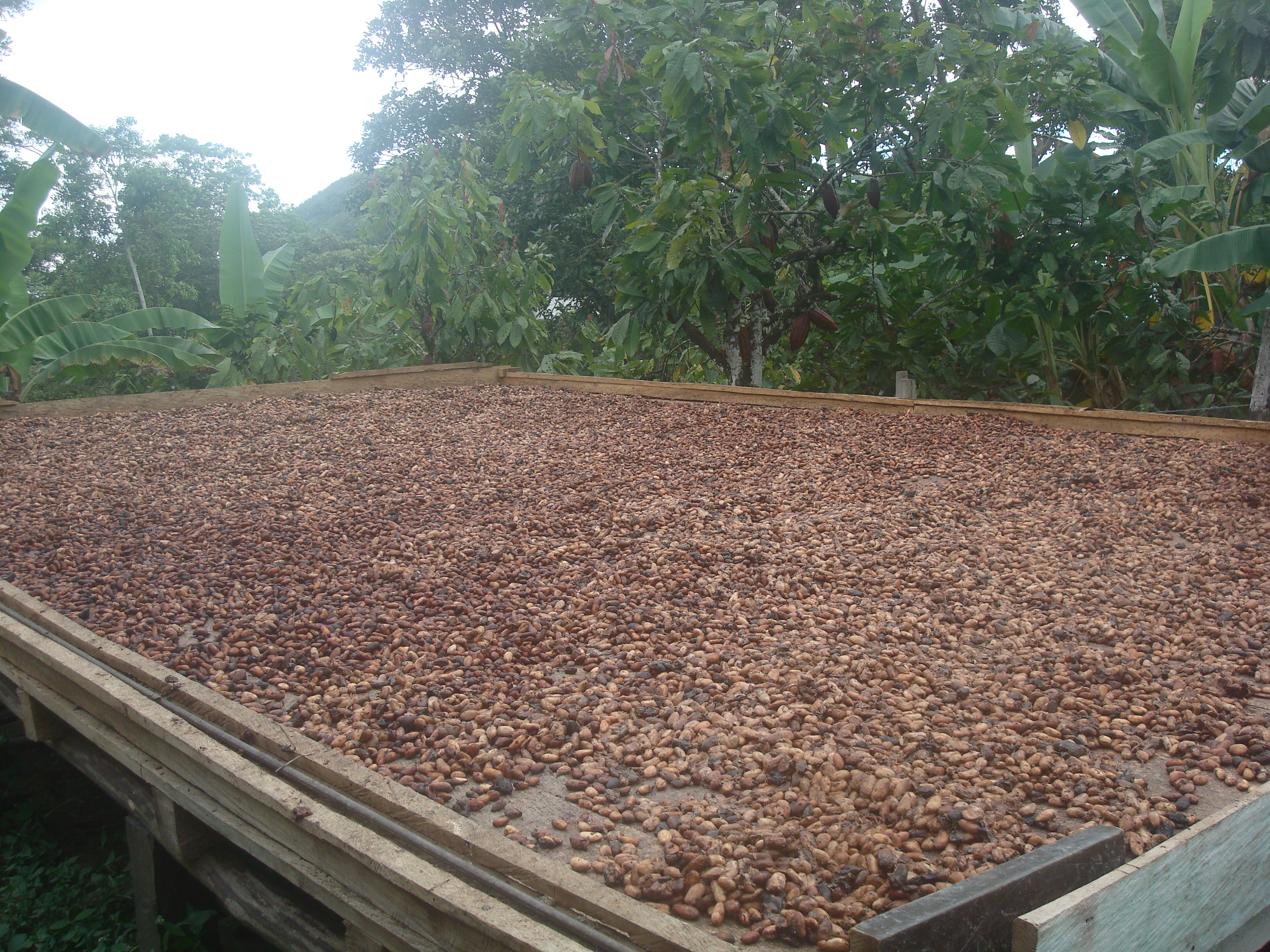
Cacao beans drying in Cunday, Colombia.

Cocoa farming can only occur 15 degrees north or south of the Equator. It can take approximately three years after planting for the trees to be fruitful enough to harvest the pods. Cocoa pods are pollinated by tiny flies called midges. Ripe cocoa pods, which are yellow in colour, are then cut down from the trees using a machete.

Use of a machete in this fashion, termed machete technology, prevents disease from spreading among cocoa pods, and thereby decreases the need for pesticides. The pods can be very low on branches and easily accessible or higher up on thick branches. Once they are gathered, they are sliced open and the cocoa beans are extracted from the pods. The beans are then spread out, usually between banana leaves, for a number of days to ferment.

Next, the seeds are placed in the sun to dry for several more days. After drying, they are gathered, placed into bags and taken to collection offices. From there, they are shipped around the world to be processed into end products.

== Environmental impacts ==
=== Full sun cocoa ===
Cocoa farms are generally very small, family owned and operated businesses. There are approximately 4.5 million cocoa farms around the world. The majority of cocoa farms are located in Ivory Coast and Ghana. In Ghana, Cocoa contributes 64% of all exports. Traditional cocoa farms are planted in the shade among other crops and trees. They are especially found in the tropical rainforest areas. Farming cocoa beans is a long process and many factors can affect the farm's yield.

Farms' cocoa crop outputs struggle to match the increasing demand for chocolate. It is estimated that the demand for chocolate will increase twofold by the year 2050. Farmers have shifted towards unsustainable, less environmentally conscious practices to meet these demands. About 90% of cacao grown worldwide is on small family farms. Cocoa bean prices are so low that farmers have to focus on increasing their yields and making more money from their relatively small plots of land. This leads to intensification of land use, sun growth, and use of child labor.

Some farmers have shifted their crops out of the shade and into direct sunlight. This practice yields a greater quantity in a short period and at lower quality. Cacao trees with no shade tend to accumulate more weeds as well as be more susceptible to diseases such as Witches Broom and Frosty Pod Rot. If the crops begin to accumulate pests, farmers use large amounts of herbicides to rid the crops of these pests. The herbicides used damage the land and the health of the sprayers applying the herbicide. Excessive spraying of pesticides can also cause the weeds and insects to build up a resistance which will eventually create more harm to the crops. Sun cultivation of cocoa may require clearing overstory as well as understory, which contributes to deforestation and habitat loss.

=== Deforestation ===
Cocoa farming also contributes to rainforest and old-growth forest deforestation. By clearing land in these forests, farmers decrease the biodiversity and interactions between the many different organisms that naturally live in the area. Many wildlife habitats are destroyed and the plant species diversity is drastically reduced. Nutrients begin to leach out of the soil due to poor irrigation and inadequate soil protection, which can increase the erosion of the soil. The more intense the farming practices are, the more damaging they are to the ecosystem. Cocoa farming becomes a destructive circle as farmers wear out the soils and cut further into the forest to obtain fresh land. All of these processes stress the Cacao trees and result in lower yields, giving the opposite effect to what the farmers expect from these practices.

Some of the forests in Ghana and other Cocoa producing countries have been declared protected by the government after observing the Tropical Rainforest destruction. However, with a shortage of fresh land to plant Cacao trees, some farmers are beginning to illegally cut down parts of these protected forests. It has been estimated that approximately 50% of these protected forests have been cut down.

On 13 September 2017 NGO Mighty Earth released a report documenting findings that Cargill, Olam International and Barry Callebaut purchase cocoa grown illegally in national parks and other protected forests in the Ivory Coast to feed demand from large chocolate companies like Mars, Hershey's, Nestlé, Mondelez, Lindt and Ferrero.

The report accused the companies of endangering the forest habitats of chimpanzees, elephants and the many other wildlife populations by purchasing cocoa linked to deforestation. As a result of cocoa production, 7 of the 23 Ivorian protected areas have been almost entirely converted to cocoa. Cargill, Olam International and Barry Callebaut were notified of the findings of Mighty Earth’s investigation and did not deny that the company sourced its cocoa from protected areas in the Ivory Coast.

== Proposed solutions ==
Through groups and programs such as the World Cocoa Foundation, Rainforest Alliance, Roundtable for a Sustainable Cocoa Economy, and activities of regional NGOs like Conservation Alliance, IITA and Solidaridad cocoa farming can return to its sustainable roots through education programs and help in finding ecologically and economically sound resources to further their farming. As a last resort, some programs will help farmers to access pest control products such as biocides as an alternative to the harmful pesticides being used. Other programs promote proper irrigation, composting, suitable soil management, and intercropping, meaning planting other trees and fruit crops in the surrounding land of the Cacao trees. Some farmers will burn old, fermented pods and place them back on the soil as a form of composting and fertilizer. To stop the process of deforestation, it is suggested that farmers replant on their current land while using the practices previously mentioned.

=== Shade-grown cocoa ===
Cacao pods evolved to grow in the shade of a highly biodiverse rainforest canopy. It has been suggested that Cocoa farmers go back to the original and natural ways of farming, by planting within the natural tree-cover and without cutting down existing trees. When an area has already been clearcut another possibility exists. Planting trees, especially fruit filled trees around and within the plantation, helps with growth of Cacao plants. These trees can provide shade to the Cacao plants and be a source of oxygen replenishment to the environment. Additionally, planting cacao under taller trees protects the more fragile cacao from direct sunlight, which greatly increases the length of its productivity and makes the cacao tree less vulnerable to disease. Another benefit of such companion planting is the increase in potential habitats for birds and insects. If the shade trees are fruit-bearing, this can also provide additional income to the farmer. However, simplifying such shade-cover may threaten biodiversity. Therefore, maintaining the complexity of shade structures is paramount in combatting losses of biodiversity.

Shade trees return organic matter to the soil through falling leaf litter and decaying branches. The shade provided by these trees also helps to keep soil moist in dry seasons which results in less damaging irrigation practices. Shade trees will raise the amount of infiltration and slow erosion of the soil. Since shade inhibits the growth of weeds, farmers are able to use less or perhaps no pesticides which can decrease the occurrences of Witches Broom in these crops. Cacao plants that grow in the shade provide the environment with more biodiversity, allowing natural populations and habitats to flourish. Finally, shade can be extremely helpful in keeping and lengthening the productivity of old growth Cacao plants.

== See also ==
- Children in cocoa production
- Cocoa production in Ivory Coast
- Cocoa production in Ghana
- The Dark Side of Chocolate, a 2010 documentary
