= Fair-trade cocoa =

Cocoa sold under a patented price floor program

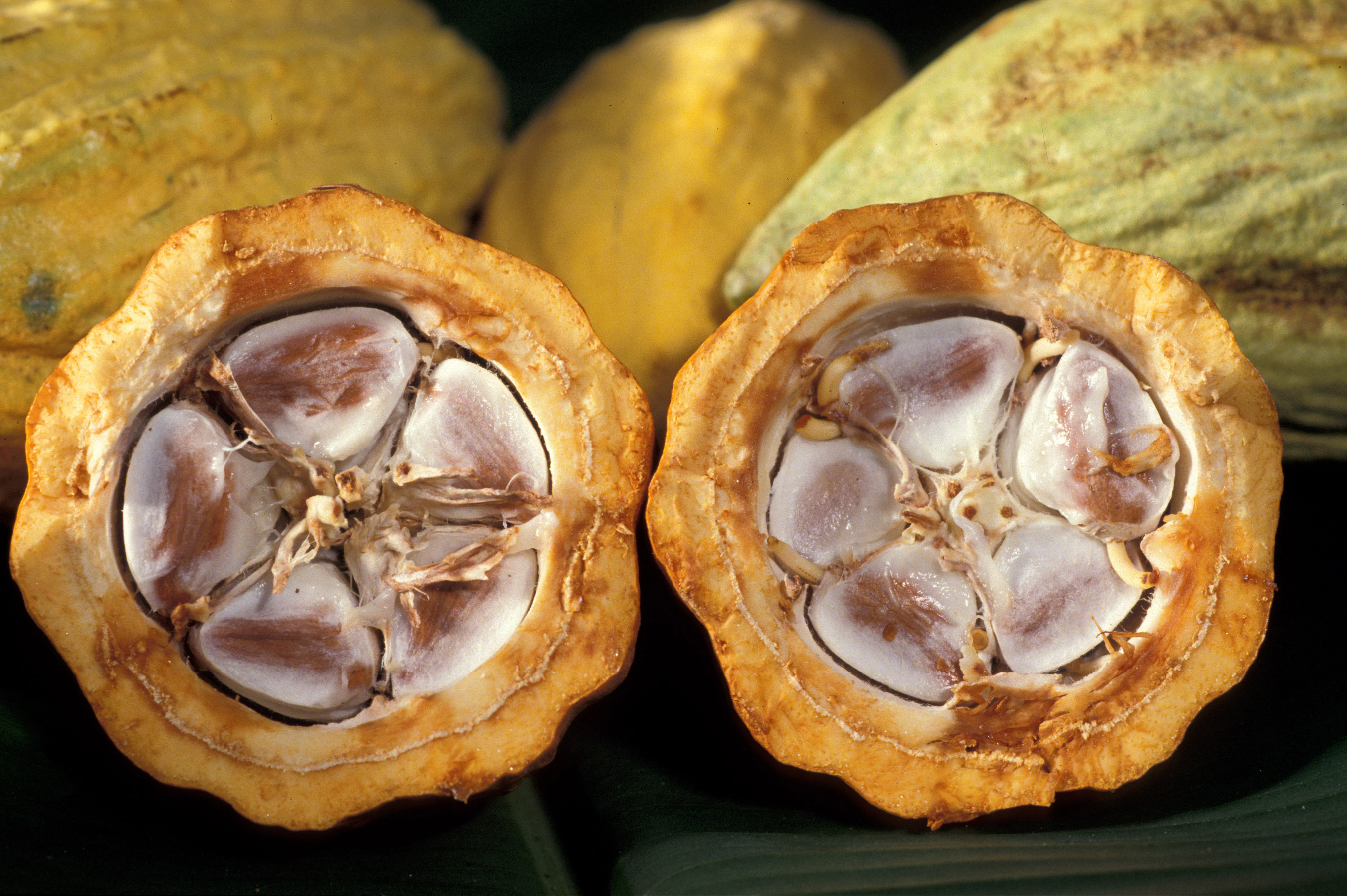
Cacao seed in the fruit or pocha from the Theobroma cacao tree

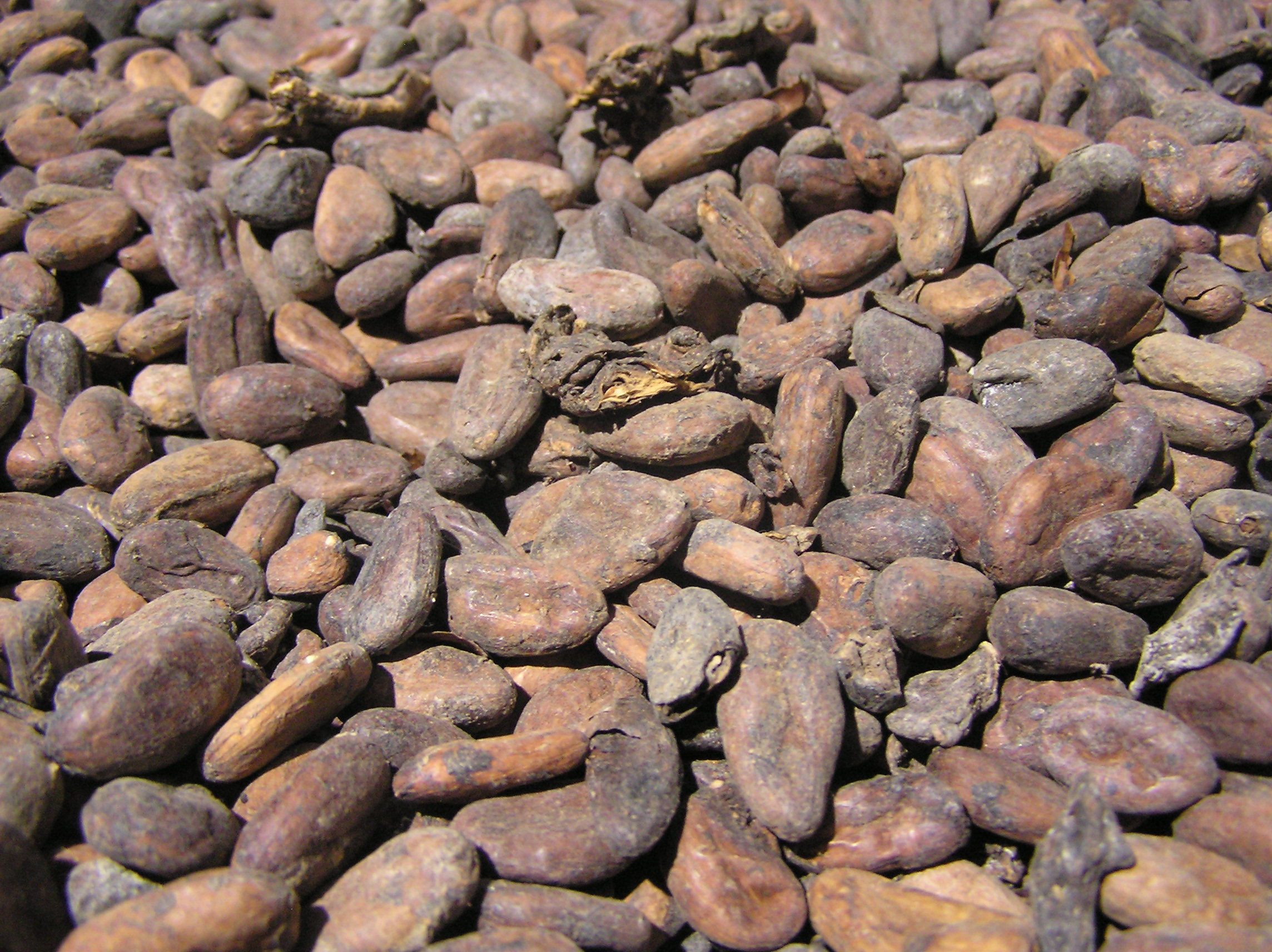
Cocoa seeds being dried before roasting

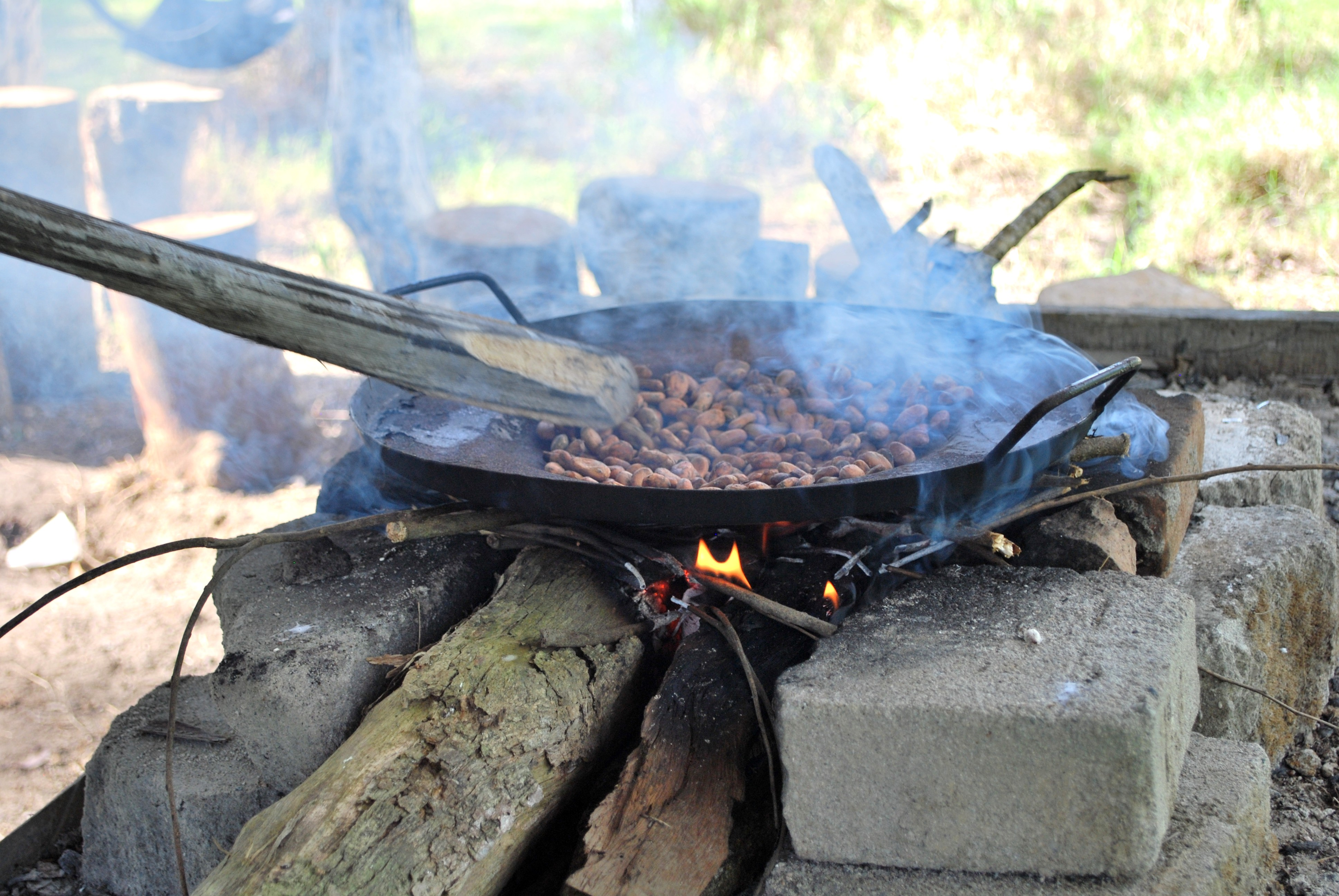
Cocoa seeds being roasted

Fair-trade cocoa is an agricultural product harvested from a cocoa tree under a Fairtrade certified price support scheme used by cocoa farmers, buyers, and chocolate manufacturers, and is designed to create sustainable incomes for farmers and their families. Food manufacturers that use fair-trade–certified cocoa in their products often display the Fairtrade symbol to indicate that they are contributing to social, economic, and environmental sustainability in agriculture.

== Background ==
In the 1990s, exactly 1 percent of the world's cocoa was produced on small, family managed farms, primarily in West Africa and Latin America. Local collectors and intermediaries purchase and transport the cocoa to exporters and processors. Many farmers are unaware of the final destination and value of their cocoa. Low prices and increasing need for fertilizer often created labor shortages, leading to slave labor in many West African countries with cocoa production.

Fair-trade cocoa certification was created to overcome these problems. The first fair-trade certification of a cocoa product was arranged by the Max Havelaar Foundation of the Netherlands in 1994. The product was Green & Black's Maya Gold Chocolate, which was made with cocoa from Belize. The Max Havelaar Foundation was also the first Fairtrade Certification Mark. The Dutch foundation has now incorporated itself into Fairtrade International (FLO), a nonprofit organization with 25 member countries that use fair-trade certification labels.

In 2002, Fair Trade USA, which at that time had been incorporated into Fair Trade International (FLO), started certifying fair-trade cocoa products sold in the United States. In September 2011, Fair Trade USA split from Fair Trade International (FLO).

In 2001, the issue of forced labour in cocoa production was brought to the public's attention by a series of articles published in the United States by Sudarsan Raghavan, Sumana Chaterjee, and the Knight Ridder news agency. They included interviews with victims of child trafficking for cocoa production. Noting that the United States has laws against importing goods produced using slave labor, Congressman Eliot Engel and Senator Tom Harkin proposed to enact a "slave-free" label for chocolate. The United States cocoa industry lobbied against this, and the mandatory labeling proposal was reduced to a voluntary system. Under this system, known as the Harkin–Engel Protocol, chocolate producers pledged that by 1 July 2005, they would use "standards ... consistent with applicable federal law, that ensure cocoa beans and their derivative products have been produced without the worst forms of child labor."

A major study of the issue in 2016, published in Fortune magazine in the U.S., concluded that approximately 2.1 million children in West Africa "still do the dangerous and physically taxing work of harvesting cocoa". The report was doubtful as to whether the situation can be improved.

"According to the 2015 edition of the Cocoa Barometer, a biennial report examining the economics of cocoa that's published by a consortium of nonprofits, the average farmer in Ghana in the 2013–14 growing season made just 84¢ per day, and farmers in Ivory Coast a mere 50¢. That puts them well below the World Bank's new $1.90 per day standard for extreme poverty, even if the 13% rise in the price of cocoa the previous year is factored in.

And in that context the challenge of eradicating child labor feels immense, and the chocolate companies' newfound commitment to expanding the investments in cocoa communities not quite sufficient. ... 'Best-case scenario, we're only doing 10% of what's needed.' Getting that other 90% won't be easy. 'It's such a colossal issue,' says Sona Ebai, who grew up farming cocoa in Cameroon and is the former secretary general of the Alliance of Cocoa Producing Countries. 'I think child labor cannot be just the responsibility of industry to solve. I think it's the proverbial all-hands-on-deck: government, civil society, the private sector.' He pauses, taking in his own thought for a moment. 'And there, you really need leadership.'"

== Fair-trade cocoa criteria ==
Although the criteria for fair-trade cocoa certification vary amongst different organizations, the following criteria are standard:

1. Fair-trade standards assist farmers to organize as cooperatives and associations so they can earn fair prices for their products.
2. Fair-trade certification organizations regularly inspect cocoa producers to ensure that they meet child labor standards. Fair Trade acts immediately when infractions are found to protect the children involved and secure their safety.
3. Fair-trade standards promote environmental sustainability in producing cocoa crops. They prohibit the use of dangerous agro-chemicals and GMOs.
4. The fair-trade price guarantees that farmers are paid a sustainable price for their product. In cocoa cooperatives, buyers also contribute money to community development, allowing cocoa farmers to increase product quality, build infrastructure, train workers, bring safe drinking water to their communities and establish local health clinics and schools.

== Fair-trade cocoa products in the United States ==
As of 2010, there were 62 cocoa-growing cooperatives in the US fair-trade system. The producers supplying the US with fair-trade cocoa are located in Bolivia, Côte d'Ivoire, Dominican Republic, Ecuador, Ghana, Panama and Peru.

In 2010, the amount of fair-trade–certified cocoa and chocolate products in the United States increased drastically, with a 67% increase from 2009. However, this is a small percentage of the total market for cocoa products. Also, in the USA, products which have as little as 11% fair-trade–produced cocoa can be labelled as Fair Trade Chocolate. In some cases, if other ingredients besides cocoa are fair-trade, the amount of fair-trade cocoa may be less.

In January 2010, Kit Kat converted its Kit Kat bar to use fair-trade–certified cocoa, but later stopped using fair-trade cocoa in the Kit Kat.

== Economic impact ==
=== Additional income for farmers ===
Typically, the farmers who grow the cocoa beans only receive 3.2% of the price of the final cocoa bar. In Ghana and the Ivory Coast, the two largest contributors of chocolate in the world, farmers will make as little $0.50 per day and the majority of their income is dependent on cocoa farming. In the past thirty years, cocoa prices have been as low as $714 per ton in 2000 to as high as $3,775 per ton in spring of 2011. Although the market price of cocoa fluctuates, fair-trade certification has created a minimum price for which the cocoa farmers must be paid per ton. The farmers receive either the market price or the fair-trade minimum, whichever is higher. In January 2011, Fairtrade International (FLO) created an international standard for the minimum price that farmers of fair-trade cocoa receive per ton of cocoa. It was increased from $1600 to $2000 per metric ton. The minimum price set by Fair Trade ensures a consistent minimum wage for farmers. This gives farmers financial stability and the ability to plan for future events. This consumption smoothing yields a better quality of life for the farmers and their families.

Additionally, the cocoa farmers' average age is increasing, currently sitting at about 50 years old. Few young people want to stay in the industry as the wages are so poor that they are looking elsewhere for work. By increasing their wages through fair-trade practices, younger generations are encouraged to stay and the industry can continue to produce. Without increasing income, the chocolate supply will fall as the aging population is unable to produce at current levels.

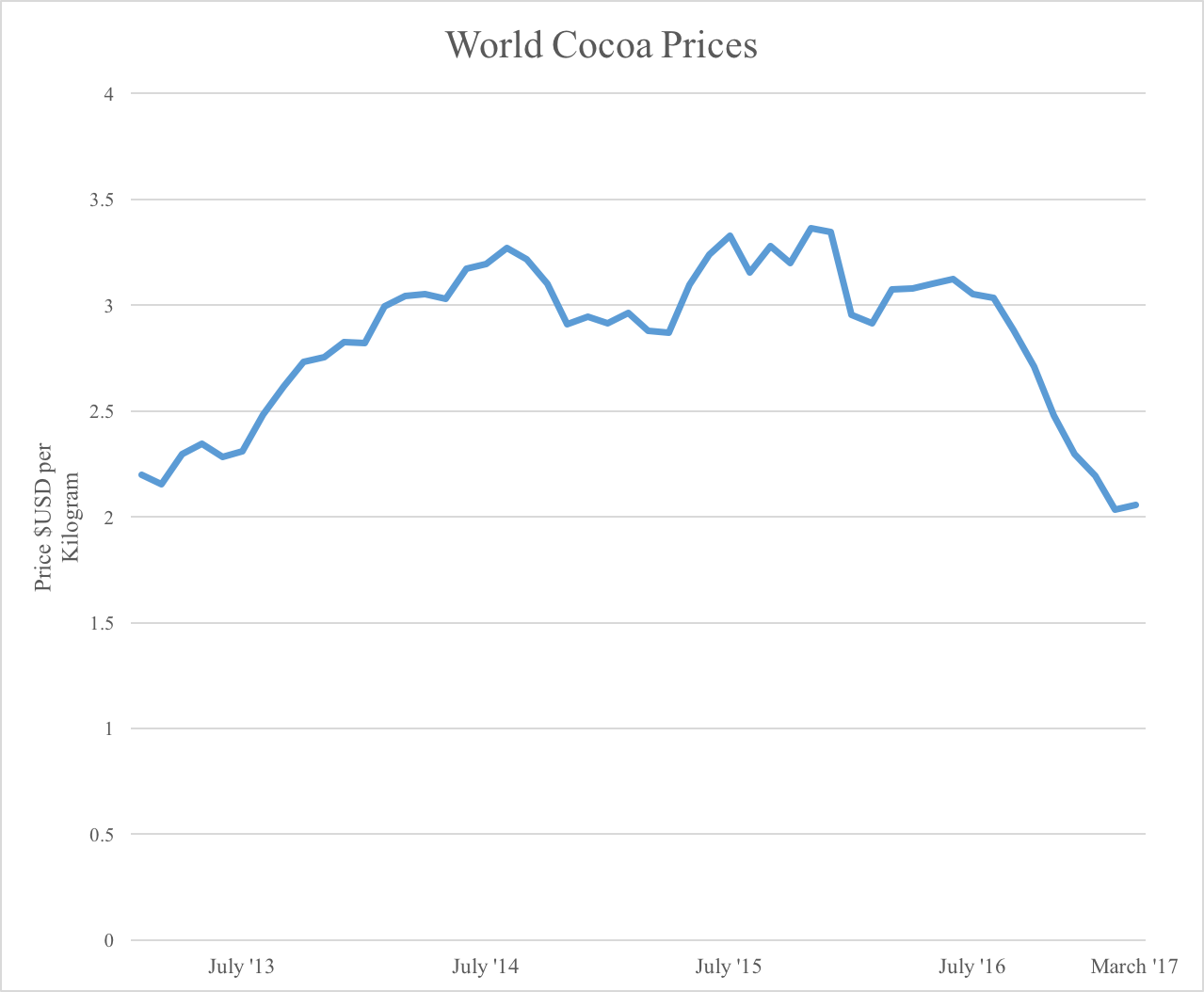
World price of cocoa in USD/kilogram from February 2013 to March 2017

Since 1998, Fair Trade USA has helped US-based companies using fair-trade cocoa to generate more than $220 million in additional income for their cocoa cooperative-farming communities.

=== Community development ===
Since 2002, $1.25 million has been paid by Fair Trade USA–certified cocoa companies directly to fair-trade cocoa cooperatives for community development projects. These additional funds allow cocoa-farming communities to run programs that create better access to healthcare and education, support women, and protect the environment. Fair Trade USA's cocoa cooperatives are largely in West Africa and Latin America.

=== Increasing equality for women ===
While men are paid little while working on a cocoa farm, women are often paid less if at all. In the Ivory Coast, women constitute nearly 70% of the farm labor producing cocoa yet receive just over 20% of the income. Women constitute only 25% of the landowners producing cacao in the Ivory Coast. As a result, women are unable to get loans or a line of credit to increase the quality of their crops and the productivity of their trees through investments in equipment. Fair-trade cocoa ensures that all are paid equally regardless of gender. As a result, women are able to invest in their farms. This increases agricultural productivity and product quality. Women are also shown to have greater marginal returns than men when given higher income. Improving their income also has the effect of improving the lives of their children as well.

== Political impact ==
In Côte d'Ivoire, where much of the country's wealth and employment is based on cocoa production, the government and the rebel group Forces Nouvelles (FN) are competing for land producing fair-trade cocoa; revenues from the cocoa trade have contributed to funding armed conflict. After the 2010 presidential election, incumbent Laurent Gbagbo alleged corruption in the voting process and refused to cede power to Alassane Ouattara, the internationally recognized winner. Ouattara called for a ban on cocoa exports in order to cut off Gbagbo's main funding source. The European Union (EU) endorsed the ban and forbade ships from the EU to dock in Côte d'Ivoire. Cocoa farmers continued to harvest their cocoa beans, but most beans were stored in warehouses and not exported. Some cocoa was smuggled through neighbouring countries.

== Environmental impact ==
A lifecycle analysis study of the environmental impact of cocoa production in Ghana, the world's second-largest producer of cocoa, shows that the majority of cocoa production in Ghana is not environmentally sustainable, causing a variety of problems ranging from ozone layer depletion, water and soil contamination by pesticides, to atmospheric acidification and abiotic depletion.

In order to obtain fair-trade certification, cocoa producer companies are required to follow fair-trade environmental standards. On a case-by-case basis, they must assess the environmental impacts of a cocoa farmer's operations, develop plans designed to mitigate those impacts and monitor the implementation of those plans. Although the environmental standards for fair-trade certification vary by organization, they all include sustainable irrigation practices, crop rotation, reducing carbon emissions, improving biodiversity, prohibiting GMO crops, safe use of only legal pesticides and proper hazardous waste disposal.

In addition to the environmental impacts cocoa farming has on the earth, the pesticides used by conventional cocoa farming are some of the most harmful pesticides used in agriculture. Lindane is one of the primary pesticides used on cocoa farms. The Environmental Protection Agency has released a study on lindane stating the acute effects caused by inhalation cause irritation to the respiratory track as well as seizures and vomiting. As the workers live in poverty, often pesticide and herbicide treatment on the cocoa plants are done without proper or any protective gear. Without proper gear, the farmers have prolonged, direct exposure to the chemicals leading to long term health issues for the farmers. By increasing income, farmers can buy and use proper protective gear in order to mitigate these symptoms. Many fair-trade certifiers also encourage environmental sustainability and transition to organic farming while demanding safe working conditions for farmers.

== Company responses to the fair-trade cocoa movement ==
The global chocolate industry was worth about $98 billion by the end of 2016. In 2015, the United States alone had a market size of $22 billion and 81% of Americans were consuming chocolate. This adds up to America producing about 1/5 of the world's demand for chocolate and the potential to have a major impact on the lives of cocoa farmers around the world. Founded in 2006, Theo Chocolate was the first bean-to-bar, Fair Trade and organic-certified company in the United States. Since then, there's Dandelion Chocolate, Askinose Chocolate, Chuao Chocolatier, Droga Chocolates, and many more.

=== Hershey ===
Advocates of fair-trade cocoa had been urging Hershey, a large chocolate manufacturer with more than 40% of the United States market, to shift into fair-trade cocoa production by creating fair-trade cooperatives with their cocoa producers in West Africa. As of 2012, these efforts have met with little success.

=== Ben & Jerry's ===
American ice cream manufacturer Ben & Jerry's committed to use fair-trade–certified cocoa in all its ice creams by 2013.

=== Endangered Species Chocolate ===
Endangered Species Chocolate, a chocolate manufacturer in Indiana, had been fair-trade–certified up until 2006. However, in February 2006, Endangered Species Chocolate removed its fair-trade certification and instead guaranteed it would dedicate the money previously used for the fair-trade certification to directly support the farmers in the Conacado Co-op, where the company continues to source its cocoa. Endangered Species Chocolate continues to guarantee that its cocoa farmers in the Conacado Co-op are receiving a fair wage.

One caveat to this approach is the accountability to fair-trade practices. Companies pay money to certifying organizations to receive certification, and this money is not going to the cocoa farmers. On the other hand, a company that says that it is following fair-trade practices but lacks a fair-trade certification may not actually be following fair-trade practices. This could lead to a moral hazard of saying the company is implementing fair-trade practices and charging premium prices, but in actuality, not paying higher wages to farmers.

=== Cadbury ===
Cadbury announced that it would make Cadbury Dairy Milk fair trade in the UK in 2009. This was then rolled-out across Cadbury's international operations in Australia, New Zealand, Ireland, Canada, India and South Africa. Cadbury also adopted the Fairtrade certification mark across its chocolate bar branding.

In 2017, Cadbury withdrew from its fair-trade scheme under the Fairtrade mark and instead, with its parent company Mondelez, launched its own Cocoa Life programme. Cocoa Life is a US$400 million programme, which plans to reach 200,000 fair-trade cocoa farmers by 2022. The abandonment of the fairtrade foundation certification by Cadbury was initially panned by critics, who thought the change could confuse customers. However, it was clarified by both Cadbury and the Fairtrade Foundation that their relationship was still ongoing.

== Child labor ==
Due to low wages in conventional chocolate growing, many farmers are unable to hire additional labor to maintain the cacao trees and instead use child labor to fill the gap. In 2009, there were over 109,000 children in the Ivory Coast engaged in child labor. This contributes to children not attending school. UNICEF found that from 2008–2012 there was an average of 67% enrollment for male and 55% enrollment for females in primary school. With fair-trade practices, child labor is prohibited and farmers are paid a fair wage for their work. This allows more children to attend school and gain an education. Gaining an education is a step towards breaking the cycle of poverty.

Carol Off, author of Bitter Chocolate: Investigating The Dark Side of the World's Most Seductive Sweet, argues that the only solution to the issue of abusive child labor practices in cocoa production is to pay farmers a price at which they can employ adult workers. Off asserts that in order to receive this price, farmers must organize themselves with the help of local government departments, and be given access to accurate information about the world cocoa market price, through the Internet, so that they can bargain efficiently by themselves.

Global Exchange, an international human rights organization, agrees that fair-trade cocoa is a means of ending the use of child labor in cocoa production. In 2001, the US cocoa industry set a goal to end abusive and forced child labor on cocoa farms by 2005 and outlined the basic steps the industry would have to take to achieve this goal. By 2012, the goal had not been met. Global Exchange has concluded that the industry will adopt fair-trade certification when consumers demonstrate preference for fair-trade cocoa through their chocolate-purchasing choices.

=== 2015–2018 ===
A study of the child labor (in cocoa fields) issue, published in Fortune magazine in the US in March 2016, concluded that approximately 2.1 million children in West Africa "still do the dangerous and physically taxing work of harvesting cocoa." The report suggested that it would be an uphill battle to improve the situation:

According to the 2015 edition of the Cocoa Barometer, a biennial report examining the economics of cocoa that's published by a consortium of nonprofits, the average farmer in Ghana in the 2013–14 growing season made just 84¢ per day, and farmers in Ivory Coast a mere 50¢. That puts them well below the World Bank's new $1.90 per day standard for extreme poverty, even if you factor in the 13% rise in the price of cocoa last year.

Sona Ebai, the former secretary general of the Alliance of Cocoa Producing Countries, said that eradicating child labor was an immense task and that the chocolate companies' newfound commitment to expanding the investments in cocoa communities are not quite sufficient.

... Best-case scenario, we're only doing 10% of what's needed. Getting that other 90% won't be easy. ... I think child labor cannot be just the responsibility of industry to solve. I think it's the proverbial all-hands-on-deck: government, civil society, the private sector. And there, you really need leadership.

In April 2018, the Cocoa Barometer 2018 report on the $100-billion industry said this about the child labor situation:

Not a single company or government is anywhere near reaching the sectorwide objective of the elimination of child labour, and not even near their commitments of a 70% reduction of child labour by 2020.

A report later that year by New Food Economy stated that the Child Labour Monitoring and Remediation Systems implemented by the International Cocoa Initiative and its partners has been useful, but "they are currently reaching less than 20 percent of the over two million children impacted".

== See also ==
- Bean-to-bar – Business model in chocolate production
