= Chocolate cartel =

Chocolate cartel may refer to:

- Big Chocolate, a term for multinational chocolate producers
- Côte d'Ivoire–Ghana Cocoa Initiative, an intergovernmental organisation of cocoa-producing countries
- The fictional antagonists of the 2023 musical fantasy film Wonka
