= Child labour in cocoa production =

Use of children in the production of cocoa beans

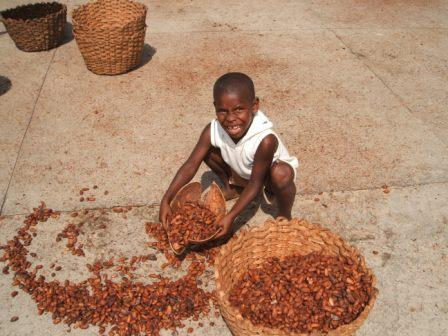
Boy collecting dried cocoa beans

Child labour is a recurring issue in cocoa production. Ivory Coast and Ghana together produce nearly 60% of the world's cocoa each year. During the 2018/19 cocoa-growing season, research commissioned by the U.S. Department of Labor was conducted by NORC at the University of Chicago in these two countries and found that 1.48 million children are engaged in hazardous work on cocoa farms including working with sharp tools and agricultural chemicals and carrying heavy loads. The number of children is significant, representing 43 percent of all children living in agricultural households in cocoa-growing areas. During the same period cocoa production in Ivory Coast and Ghana increased 62 percent while the prevalence of child labour in cocoa production among all agricultural households increased by 14 percentage points. Attention on this subject has focused on West Africa, which collectively supplies 69% of the world's cocoa, and Côte d'Ivoire, supplying 35%, in particular.

The 2016 Global Estimates of Child Labor indicate that one-fifth of all African children are involved in child labour. Nine percent of African children are in hazardous work. It is estimated that more than 1.8 million children in West Africa are involved in growing cocoa. A 2013–14 survey commissioned by the Department of Labor and conducted by Tulane University found that an estimated 1.4 million children aged 5 years old to 11 years old worked in agriculture in cocoa-growing areas, while approximately 800,000 of them were engaged in hazardous work, including working with sharp tools and agricultural chemicals and carrying heavy loads. According to the NORC study, methodological differences between the 2018/9 survey and earlier ones, together with errors in the administration of the 2013/4 survey have made it challenging to document changes in the number of children engaged in child labour over the past five years.

A major study of the issue, published in Fortune magazine in the U.S. in March 2016, concluded that approximately 2.1 million children in West Africa "still do the dangerous and physically taxing work of harvesting cocoa". The report was doubtful as to whether the situation can be improved significantly.

== Child labor ==
In 2001, the report A Taste of Slavery: How Your Chocolate May be Tainted won a George Polk Award. In it were claims that traffickers promised paid work, housing, and education to children who were forced to labour and undergo severe abuse, that some children were held forcibly on farms and worked up to 100 hours per week, and that attempted escapees were beaten. It quoted a former slave: "The beatings were a part of my life" and "when you didn't hurry, you were beaten."

A small observational study, published in 2005 and financed by USAID, examines the many health hazards of cocoa production in western Ghana.

In 2006, a study showed many children working on small farms in Côte d'Ivoire, often on family farms. Over 11,000 people working on small Ivorian cocoa farms were surveyed. A report funded by the U.S. Department of Labor concluded that "Industry and the Governments of Côte d'Ivoire and Ghana have taken steps to investigate the problem and are implementing projects that address issues identified in the Protocol."

In 2008, in a report featuring responses from Cargill and Hershey's, Fortune magazine reported that "little progress has been made", and in June 2009, the OECD released a position paper on child labour on West African Cocoa Farms, and launched a website on its Regional Cocoa Initiative.

A major report released in 2015 by the Payson Center for International Development of Tulane University, funded by the United States Department of Labor, reported a 51% increase in the number of child workers (1.4 million) in the cocoa industry in 2013–14, compared to 2008–09. The report estimated that over 1.4 million children ages 5 years old to 11 years old were working in agriculture in cocoa-growing areas, approximately 800,000 of them engaged in hazardous work, including working with agricultural chemicals, carrying heavy loads, and working with sharp tools.

A study of the issue, published in Fortune magazine in the U.S. in March 2016, concluded that approximately 2.1 million children in West Africa "still do the dangerous and physically taxing work of harvesting cocoa". The report suggested that it would be a persistent challenge to improve the situation:

According to the 2015 edition of the Cocoa Barometer, a biennial report examining the economics of cocoa that's published by a consortium of nonprofits, the average farmer in Ghana in the 2013–14 growing season made just 84¢ per day, and farmers in Ivory Coast a mere 50¢. That puts them well below the World Bank's new $1.90 per day standard for extreme poverty, even if you factor in the 13% rise in the price of cocoa last year.

Sona Ebai, the former secretary general of the Alliance of Cocoa Producing Countries, said that eradicating child labour was an immense task and that the chocolate companies' newfound commitment to expanding the investments in cocoa communities is not sufficient: "Best-case scenario, we're only doing 10% of what's needed. Getting that other 90% won't be easy. ... I think child labour cannot be just the responsibility of industry to solve. I think it's the proverbial all-hands-on-deck: government, humane society, the private sector. And there, you really need leadership."

Reported in 2018, a three-year pilot program – conducted by Nestlé through the International Cocoa Initiative with 26,000 farmers mostly located in Côte d'Ivoire – observed a 51% decrease in the number of children doing hazardous jobs in cocoa farming. A separate sub-study conducted by NORC and commissioned by the World Cocoa Foundation in 2019, provides detailed results which demonstrate that hazardous child labour has been reduced by one-third in communities where company programs are in place.

The US Department of Labor formed the Child Labor Cocoa Coordinating Group as a public-private partnership with the governments of Ghana and Côte d'Ivoire to address child labour practices in the cocoa industry. The International Cocoa Initiative involving major cocoa manufacturers established the Child Labour Monitoring and Remediation System intended to monitor thousands of farms in Ghana and Côte d'Ivoire for child labour conditions. Despite these efforts, goals to reduce child labour in West Africa by 70% before 2020 are slowed by persistent poverty, absence of schools, expansion of cocoa farmland, and increased demand for coco.

In April 2018, the Cocoa Barometer 2018 report on the $100-billion industry, said this about the child labour situation: "Not a single company or government is anywhere near reaching the sectorwide objective of the elimination of child labour, and not even near their commitments of a 70% reduction of child labour by 2020". A report later that year by New Food Economy stated that the Child Labour Monitoring and Remediation Systems implemented by the International Cocoa Initiative and its partners has been useful, but "they are currently reaching less than 20 percent of the over two million children impacted". According to the 2018 edition of the Cocoa Barometer, a biennial report examining the economics of cocoa that's published by a consortium of nonprofits, the current farmer income is $.78.

Class action lawsuits in the US against companies in the cocoa industry have not achieved much success. In 2015, lawsuits against Mars, Nestlé, and Hershey's alleged that their products' packaging failed to disclose that production may involve child slave labour. All were dismissed in 2016, although the plaintiffs filed an appeal.

Nestlé's website, as paraphrased by Mother Jones magazine, states:

The company has built or renovated 42 schools in cocoa-growing communities and has helped support families so they can afford to keep their kids in school rather than sending them off to work and the company has implemented a monitoring system, it says, to identify at-risk children and report the findings back to the company and its suppliers. When alerted to instances of child trafficking or slavery, "we report it to appropriate authorities immediately".

The company said it had spent $5.5 million on the problem in 2016. Nestlé had also published a report in 2017 on child labour in the cocoa supply chain, Tackling Child Labour, with additional specifics as to their "approach to addressing this significant, complex and sensitive challenge". In a press statement accompanying the release of the NORC report Kareem Kysia, Director of Vulnerable Populations Research at NORC and a lead author of the report, stated,

As the overall production of cocoa increased dramatically, cocoa farming spread into areas of Côte d’Ivoire and Ghana where infrastructure to monitor child labour was weak and awareness of laws regulating it was low. Interventions to stem hazardous child labour in the cocoa sector should target new, emerging areas of production and focus on efforts to reduce exposure to the component parts of hazardous child labour.

=== Income ===
Income from the cocoa industry for small cocoa farmers is not stable because when the market price of cocoa is low, the price paid to each link in the industry decreases and cocoa farmers who produce raw products get very little in the chain. To keep the cost of cocoa low, cocoa farmers seek the cheapest labour to make a profit. In Africa, a cocoa labourer can only make less than 2 dollars per day, which is below the poverty line. Child labourers between the ages of 12 and 15 in the cocoa industry work as much as an adult labourer, but they are paid less than adults. Children in cocoa growing areas face the realities of rural poverty (scarcity of land, food insecurity, lack of education infrastructure, access to potable water, poor health services, etc.). The regular practice of children working on cocoa farms is often a natural way of life for cocoa farmers who, for a variety of reasons, want to train their children and at the same time use them to reduce labour costs on the family's farm.

=== Child labour definition ===
The International Labour Organization (ILO) defines child labour as work that "is mentally, physically, socially or morally dangerous and harmful to children; and interferes with their schooling by depriving them of the opportunity to attend school; by obliging them to leave school prematurely; or by requiring them to attempt to combine school attendance with excessively long and heavy work." Not all work that children do is child labour. Work done that is not detrimental to children's health, development or schooling is beneficial because it allows children to develop skills, gain experience and prepare them for future positions; these are not considered child labour or abuse.

The forms of child labour related to cocoa production includes parents putting their children to work and keeping them out of school to reduce labour cost on family farms. Most children who work on cocoa farms do so within their family structure. However, this does not mean they are not exposed to hazards, and, beyond these situations, illegal and exploitative practices also exist. Studies suggest that in Ghana and Cote d’Ivoire's cocoa sector roughly 1% of children in child labour could be in, or at risk of, forced labour.

The United Nations declared 2021 as the International Year for the Elimination of Child Labour, and declared 5 September to be "Labour Day".

== Child slavery and trafficking ==
A 2000 BBC documentary described child slavery on commercial cocoa farms in Côte d'Ivoire. The documentary featured Kevin Bales, renowned author and professor, who later became the founding board member of the International Cocoa Initiative, a Geneva-based nonprofit funded by major chocolate makers that focuses on addressing child labour in cocoa production in West Africa. In 2001, the United States Department of State estimated there were 15,000 child slaves in cocoa, cotton, and coffee farms in Côte d'Ivoire, and the Chocolate Manufacturers Association acknowledged that children were used in the cocoa harvest of cocoa.

Malian migrants have long worked on cocoa farms in Côte d'Ivoire, but in 2000 cocoa prices had dropped to a 10-year low and some farmers stopped paying their employees. The Malian counsel had to rescue boys who had not been paid for five years and who were beaten if they tried to run away. Malian officials believed that 15,000 children, some as young as 11 years old, were working in Côte d'Ivoire in 2001. These children were often from poor families or the slums and were sold for "just a few dollars" to work in other countries. Parents were told the children would find work and send money home, but once the children left home, they often worked in conditions resembling slavery. In other cases, children begging for food were lured from bus stations and sold as slaves.

In 2002, Côte d'Ivoire had 12,000 children with no relatives nearby, which suggested they were trafficked, likely from neighboring Mali, Burkina Faso and Togo. According to a 2009 snowball sampling study, the majority of those with childhood cocoa labour experience were trafficked (75% from Burkina Faso and 63% from Mali). The majority of those who were trafficked had no interaction with police, and only 0.5% had any contact from institutions that provided social services. Burkina Faso and Togo are rated at Tier 2 in part due to trafficking for cocoa production. By 2020, West African nations Ghana and Côte d'Ivoire were upgraded to Tier 2 in the 2020 US State Department's TIP Report in part for their respective progress to curb child labour abuses in the cocoa sector.

In 2001, due to pressure applied by the US Congress and potential US and United Kingdom boycotts, the chocolate manufacturers promised to start eliminating forced child labour. In 2012, Ferrero promised that they will end cocoa slavery by 2020.

In 2018, the U.S. Department of Labor issued a report on labour conditions around the world in which a List of Goods Produced by Child Labor or Forced Labor mentioned five countries where the cocoa industry used child labour, and two countries where the cocoa industry used child labour and forced labour.

News reports as recently as 2018, indicate that "most child slaves on cocoa farms (Cote d’Ivoire and Ghana) come from Mali and Burkina Faso, two of the poorest nations on Earth. The children, some as young as ten, are sent by their families or trafficked by agents with the promise of money. They are made to work long hours for little or no money."

=== Lawsuits ===
In 2021, several companies were named in a class action lawsuit filed by eight former children from Mali who alleged that the companies aided and abetted their enslavement on cocoa plantations in Cote d’Ivoire. The suit accused Barry Callebaut, Cargill, The Hershey Company, Mars, Mondelez, Nestlé, and Olam International, of knowingly engaging in forced labour, and the plaintiffs sought damages for unjust enrichment, negligent supervision, and intentional infliction of emotional distress.

In June 2020, the United States Court of Appeals for the First Circuit unanimously found that state product labeling laws did not require Nestlé, Mars Inc., or the Hershey Company to disclose on chocolate wrappers if the ingredients used were produced by forced child labor.

== Justifications ==
The households face the realities of rural poverty such as a scarcity of land, food insecurity, limited access to quality education, lack of access to drinking water and inadequate health services.

== Production and consumption statistics ==
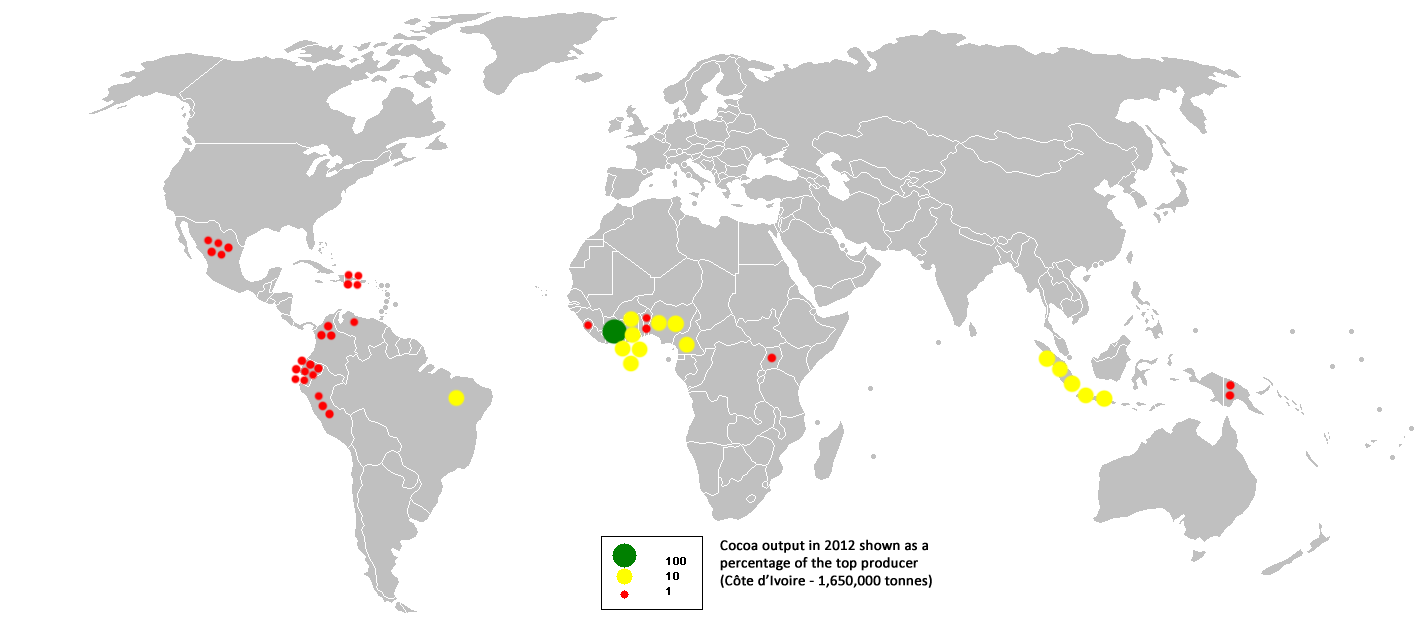
Cocoa bean output in 2012

In Ghana, the cocoa industry began in the late 19th century and in Côte d'Ivoire it began in the early 20th century. Ghana became the largest cocoa producer in the world in 1910. By 1980 Côte d'Ivoire overtook Ghana as the biggest producer. In both countries, the majority of farms are small and family-owned. Family members, including children, are often expected to work on the farms.

In the 2018–2019 growing year (which runs October through September), 4.78 hundred thousand tonnes of cocoa beans were produced. African nations produced 2.45 million tonnes (69%), Asia and Oceania 0.61 million tonnes (17%) and the Americas 0.48 million tonnes (14%). Two African nations, Côte d'Ivoire and Ghana, produce more than half of the world's cocoa, with 1.23 and 0.73 million tonnes respectively (35% and 21%, respectively).

Different metrics are used for chocolate consumption. The Netherlands has the highest monetary amount of cocoa bean imports (US$2.1 billion); it is also one of the main ports into Europe. The US has highest amount of cocoa powder imports ($220 million); the US has a large amount of cocoa complementary products. The UK has the highest amount of retail chocolate ($1.3 billion) and is one of the biggest chocolate consumption per capita markets.

== Cocoa harvest and processing ==
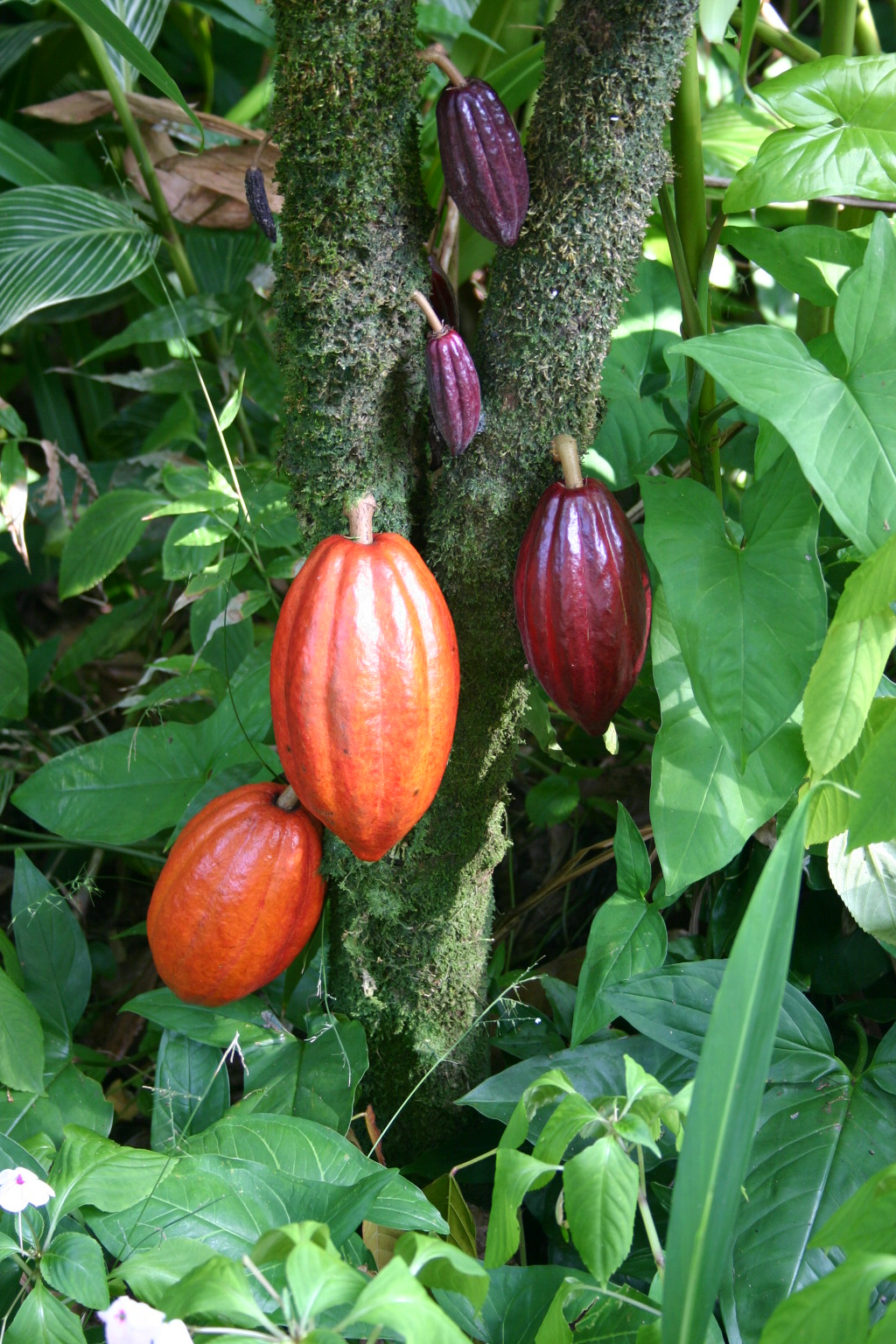
Cocoa pods in various stages of ripening

Because of the delicate nature of the cocoa tree species, cocoa trees are treated with pesticides and fungicides. Cocoa harvest is not restricted to one period per year and occurs over a period of several months to the whole year. Pods are harvested at multiple times during the harvest season because they do not all ripen at once. Pod ripening is judged by pod color, and ripe pods are harvested from the trunk and branches of the cocoa tree with a curved knife on a long pole. The pods are opened and wet beans are removed. Wet beans are transported to a facility so they can be fermented and dried.

Many of these tasks could be hazardous when performed by children, according to the ILO. Mixing and applying chemicals can be hazardous due to pesticide contamination, especially because no protective clothing is worn during application.

Clearing vegetation and harvesting pods can be hazardous because these tasks are often done using machetes, which can cause lacerations. This skill is part of normal development in children 15 to 17 years old, but is a higher risk in younger children. Many have wounds on their legs where they have cut themselves. A survey conducted by U.S. Department of Labour indicates that in 2005, 92 percent of children between the ages of 5 and 15 are involved in heavy load carrying work in the cocoa industry, which can cause open wounds.

Transport of the wet beans can also be hazardous due to long transport distances and heavy loads; hernias and physical injuries can occur.

The International Cocoa Initiative upholds the International Conventions that promote child rights and that outlaw child labour practices, as well as the relevant supporting national laws. Not all work done by children is classified as child labour. For instance, children carrying out light, non-hazardous tasks on the family farm for a limited period of time, under supervision, and without compromising their schooling, is considered as acceptable child work. This type of work is often necessary for the welfare of many families in West African rural societies. It also contributes to children's development, providing them with skills and experience that help them prepare for their adult farming life. By contrast, activities such as carrying heavy loads or using chemicals are considered as "unacceptable forms of child labour", because they are physically dangerous for children. Child trafficking and any work undertaken by children in bonded labour are extreme and criminal forms of child exploitation.

In 2019, the International Cocoa Initiative investigated the prevalence of child labour in the cocoa industry. It found 7,319 children identified as involved in one or more hazardous tasks.

== Prevention ==
=== Fair trade ===
In the 2000s, some chocolate producers began to engage in fair trade initiatives, to address concerns about the marginalization of cocoa labourers in developing countries. Traditionally, Africa and other developing countries received low prices for their exported commodities such as cocoa, which caused poverty to abound. Fairtrade seeks to establish a system of direct trade from developing countries to counteract this unfair system.

One solution for fair labour practices is for farmers to become part of an agricultural cooperative. Cooperatives pay farmers a fair price for their cocoa so farmers have enough money for food, clothes, and school fees. One of the main tenets of fair trade is that farmers receive a fair price, but this does not mean that the larger amount of money paid for fair trade cocoa goes directly to the farmers. The effectiveness of fair trade has been questioned. In a 2014 article, The Economist stated that workers on fair trade farms have a lower standard of living than on similar farms outside the fair trade system.

=== Education of child labourers ===
2019 research from the International Cocoa Initiative found a strong correlation between higher quality education and lower prevalence of child labour. ICI found that in the communities with the highest quality of education score, child labour prevalence stood at 10%, or 66% lower than in the communities with the lowest quality of education score.

=== Harkin–Engel Protocol ===
To combat child slavery in cocoa production, in 2001 US Representative Eliot Engel introduced a legislative amendment to fund the development of a "no child slavery" label for chocolate products sold in the United States. Senator Tom Harkin proposed an addition to an agriculture bill to label qualified chocolate and cocoa products as "slave free". It was approved in the House of Representatives by a vote of 291–115, but before it went to the Senate the chocolate makers hired former senators George Mitchell and Bob Dole to lobby against it, and it did not go to a vote. Instead, the chocolate manufacturers reached agreement with the Congressmen to create the Harkin–Engel Protocol to remove child forced labour from the industry by July 2005.

The voluntary agreement was a commitment by industry groups to develop and implement voluntary standards to certify cocoa produced without the "worst forms of child labor", and was witnessed by the heads of major chocolate companies, the Ambassador of Côte d'Ivoire, and others concerned with child labour. As another result of the Protocol, the International Cocoa Initiative was created to improve the lives of children in cocoa-growing communities, safeguarding their rights and contributing to the elimination of child labour by supporting the acceleration and scale-up of child-centred community development and of responsible supply chain management throughout the cocoa sector.

==== Criticism ====
The chocolate makers were to create programs in West Africa to make Africans aware of the consequences of child labour, keeping their children from an education, and child trafficking. The primary incentive for the companies' voluntary participation would be the addition of a "slave free" label. The 2005 deadline was not met, and all parties agreed to a three-year extension of the Protocol. This extension allowed the cocoa industry more time to implement the Protocol including creating a certification system to address the worst forms of child labour for half of the growing areas in Côte d'Ivoire and Ghana. By 2008, the industry had collected data from over half of the areas, as required, but they did not have proper independent verification. In June 2008, the Protocol was extended until the end of 2010. At that time, the industry was required to have full certifications with independent verifications.

The European Union passed a resolution in 2012 to fully implement the Harkin–Engel Protocol and fight child labour in cocoa production. The resolution was criticized by the International Labor Rights Forum for having no legally binding measures and two major chocolate manufacturers claimed they were addressing the problem.

The industry's pledge to reduce child labour in Cote d’Ivoire and Ghana by 70%, as per the Framework of Action in 2010, had not been met as of late 2015; the deadline was again extended, to 2020.

==== Progress in addressing child labour ====
The World Cocoa Foundation, of which all major chocolate manufacturers, buyers and the ICI are members, reported in 2020 that hazardous child labour had been reduced by one-third in communities where company programs such as Child Labour Monitoring and Remediation Systems were in place; that Governments' actions on education have led to almost all children now attending school in Ghana, with 4 out 5 in Côte d’Ivoire; and that a more than 60 percent increase in total cocoa production over the past 10 years did not bring a similar surge in child labour. According to the 2022 Chocolate Scorecard seven of the major chocolate companies are 'leading the industry' on child labour and a further seventeen companies are 'starting to implement good policies'. Companies who claimed to be addressing child labour were asked to provide evidence for this and were scored according to whether their reports were external or internal, whether just numbers or actual impact was measured, and how recently the study was undertaken.

== Representation in media and exhibitions ==
Video productions:

- The Dark Side of Chocolate (2010). A documentary film about the exploitation and slave trading of African children to harvest chocolate
- Slavery: A Global Investigation (2000). Produced by True Vision of London, exposes slavery in the cocoa plantations in the Cote d’Ivoire
- Channel 4's Modern Slavery (2000)

Podcasts:

- WKND Chocolate Dr. Kristy Leissle Scholar Series
- The Slow Melt by Simran Sethi (2016)

Books:

- The Bitter Side of Sweet by Vivian Yenika-Agbaw (2016). Fiction
- Chocolate Nations (2011) by Orla Ryan

Exhibitions:

- Bitter Chocolate Stories – Exhibition at the Tropenmuseum Amsterdam (20 September 2018 – 1 September 2019). The exhibition examines personal stories of cocoa production in Cote d’Ivoire and Ghana.

== See also ==
- Big Chocolate
- Cocoa production in Ghana
- Cocoa production in Ivory Coast
- Cocoa production in Nigeria
- International Cocoa Initiative
