= Cocoa crisis (2020s) =

Period of high cocoa prices

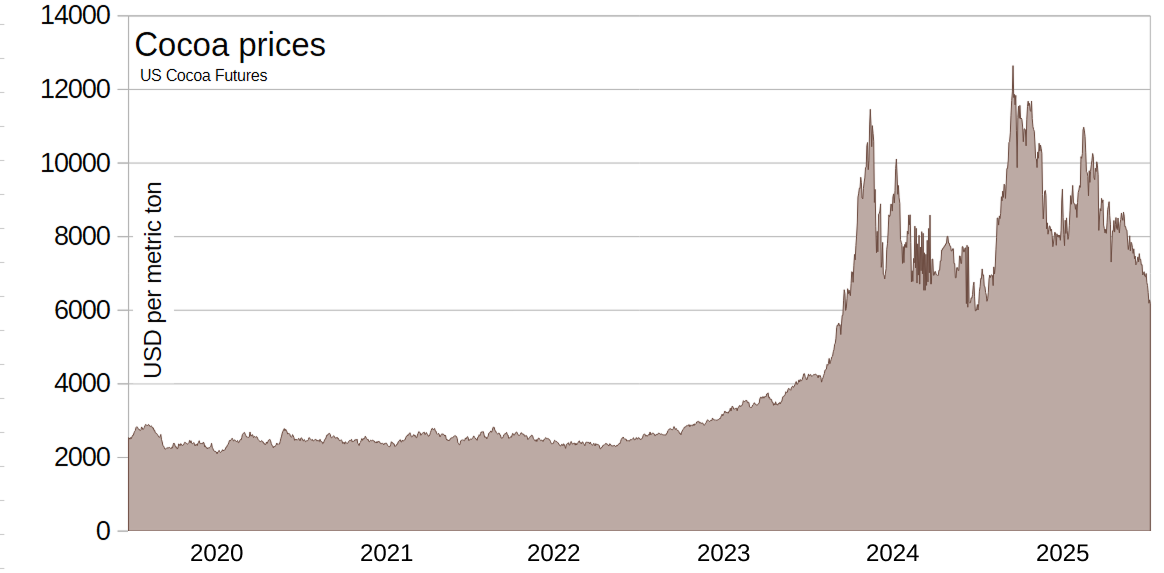
Cocoa prices between 2020 and October 2025

After a poor growing season in 2023, the cocoa crisis began as cocoa prices rose rapidly through 2024, repeatedly hitting new highs. The period followed consecutive growing seasons in West Africa impacted by weather and disease. As of October 2025, prices in London had fallen to around US$4,000 per tonne from a high of US$11,530 on 13 June 2024.

== Background ==
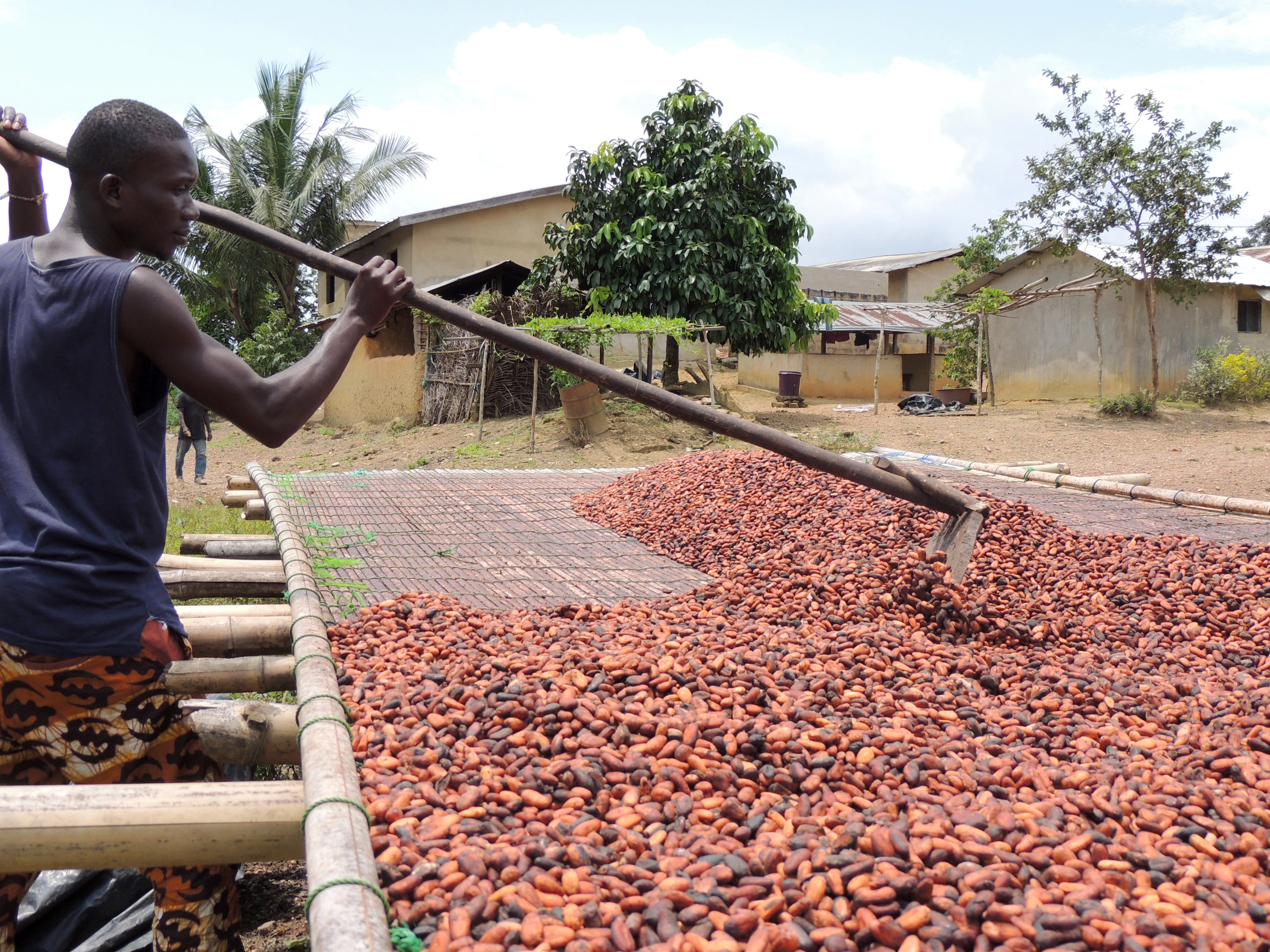
Cocoa beans being dried in Ivory Coast

Most of the world's cocoa is produced in the West African countries of Ghana and Ivory Coast; as of 2024 their output made up over 60% of global production. These countries do not produce primarily for domestic markets; rather, countries in the Global North make up 70% of global chocolate sales.

In these two countries, cocoa beans are sold in advance of the October–September growing season via government contracts to trading houses, the largest being Cargill, Olam and Barry Callebaut. After this, these contracts are traded on futures exchanges, markets which ultimately determine how much cocoa beans will cost. Since the 1980s, prices have remained relatively steady around $2,500 per tonne.

== Causes ==
The rise in cocoa prices is attributed to a range of causes, most prominently weather and disease. Unpredictable weather phenomena driven by climate change have brought about periods of high temperatures and unpredictable rainfall, sometimes causing prolonged dry stretches. Disease has particularly come in the form of black pod disease and cacao swollen shoot virus (CSSV), and in Ghana's North West where most of the country's cocoa is produced, the Ghana Cocoa Board reported in 2024 that 81% of the crop was impacted by CSSV.

Further causes came on the individual farm level. Most of the world's cocoa is produced on small, family farms, and in the past few decades, farmers have begun moving from cocoa to more profitable crops, with those remaining tending increasingly old and unproductive trees. In Ghana, prices have been further impacted by cocoa smuggling and illegal gold mining near cocoa plantations, which involves the use of chemicals such as arsenic, lead, and mercury that leach into the soil.

== Price rally ==
Following a poor harvest in 2023, prices began to increase. By December 2023, prices had risen to $4,200 a tonne, and over the following months, speculation that cocoa prices would continue to rise brought prices higher and higher, from $6,000 a tonne in February, to $9,000 a tonne in March, until prices were at almost $11,000 in mid-April. By the middle of the year, prices were fluctuating dramatically, with volatility driven by speculation and by the exit of hedge funds from the market, that acted in an effort to avoid the risk of price fluctuations, thereby reducing liquidity. On the London futures index, cocoa prices reached a high of $11,530 per tonne on 13 June; the previous year, prices had averaged $3,182. The impacts on prices in Europe were more pronounced than they were in America due to a greater reliance on West African cocoa.

During the second half of 2024, prices began to fall slightly. In late December, this reversed as prices began to again rise rapidly, and new price records were hit again on December 18. By February 2025, prices were still elevated at December and January levels. J.P. Morgan Global Research predicted in August 2025 that prices would remain structurally high despite downward trends. As of October 2025, cocoa prices in London have fallen back to $4,106 per tonne.

== Response and effects ==
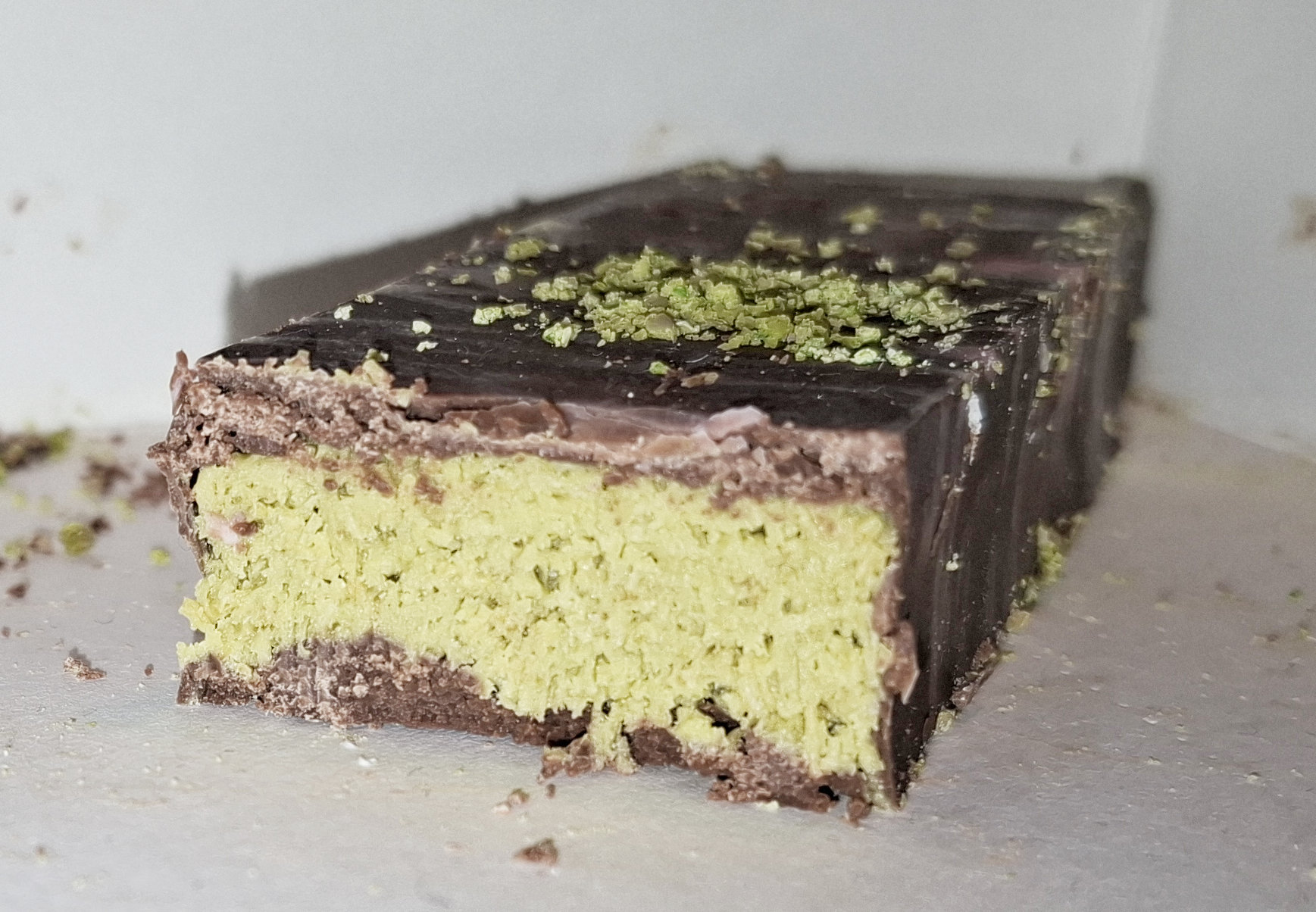
Dubai chocolate was popularized in 2024. It mixes milk chocolate, pistachio, tahini and kadayif. Manufacturers can thus reduce the impact of the rising cost of cocoa and pistachio.

In early 2024, Ghana delayed the delivery of 350,000 tonnes of cocoa beans until the next season, further increasing prices. In July 2024, the COCOBOD and confectionery manufacturer Mars Wrigley announced they were developing technology to identify early infection of CSSV. Businesses producing chocolate shuttered worldwide.

Chocolate has been described as an example of the lipstick effect: a relatively affordable luxury product which retains sales during economic downturns. In 2024, it was reported in Confectionery News that a recent survey of consumers by National Confectioners Association found that 45% of respondents had cut down on chocolate spending, by switching attributes of chocolate consumed such as brand and size.

In Nigeria, where the local cocoa industry had been in decline, farmers responded to higher prices by replacing old, unproductive trees with new saplings, and expanded the land used for farming cocoa.

== Analysis ==
In 2024, anthropologist Carla Martin described issues around cocoa production as a wicked problem. She said that the crisis highlighted what she saw as the question of "what is actually in the best interests of cocoa producers as they define their best interest?" Changes in the price of cocoa did not significantly impact the income of cocoa growers due to the complexities of the supply chain.

== See also ==
- Chocolate industry
