= Chocolate Finger =

Chocolate Finger may refer to:

- Cadbury Fingers, British chocolate biscuits
- The nickname of Anthony Ward, hedge fund manager for Armajaro
