= Ghana–Ukraine relations =

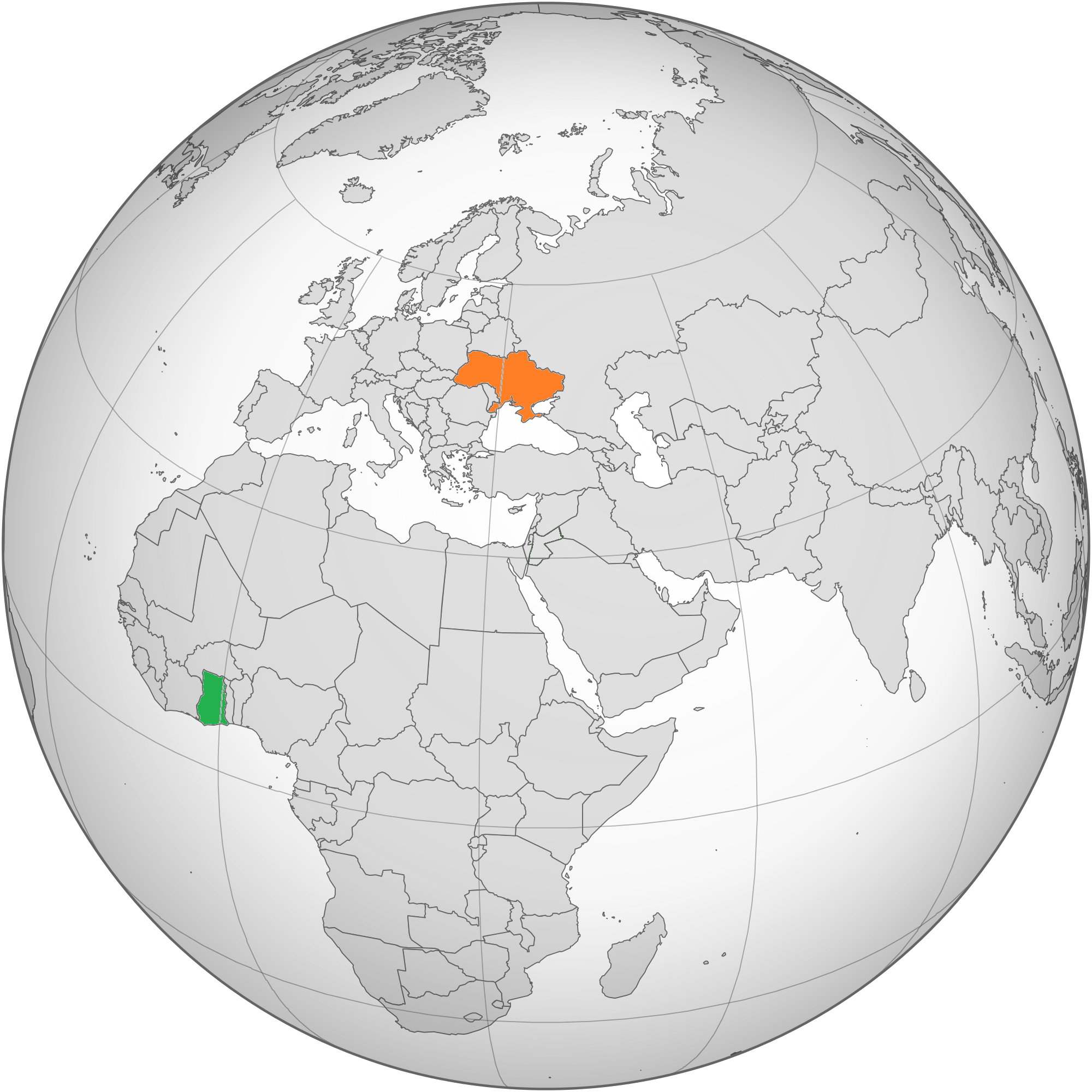
- Ghana: Ukraine

Diplomatic mission
- Honorary Consulate of Ghana, Kyiv: Embassy of Ukraine, Accra

Ghana–Ukraine relations are bilateral relations between Ghana and Ukraine.

== History ==
Ghana recognized the independence of Ukraine on April 22, 1992. The countries established diplomatic relations on June 17, 1992.

On 3 September 2002, the President of Ukraine met with the Vice President of Ghana within the framework of the World Summit on Sustainable Development in Johannesburg, South Africa.

On 10 August 2022, a telephone conversation took place between the leaders of Ukraine and Ghana. Then on the 23rd, Ghana participated in the Crimea Platform Summit.

On 5-6 October 2022, the Minister of Foreign Affairs of Ukraine paid an official visit to the Republic of Ghana as part of the first-ever tour of the Head of the Ministry of Foreign Affairs of Ukraine to African countries.

In December 2023, Ukraine officially opened its embassy in Ghana in the capital of Accra. The Honorary Consulate of Ghana in Ukraine is operating in Kyiv. Before then, the Republic of Ghana was under the responsibility of its embassy in Tunisia and embassy in Nigeria for consular services.

On 11 July 2025, Ukraine and Ghana agreed to a new partnership, where Ghana would help fund Ukrainian drone production and Ukraine would help Ghana secure its national borders.

== Economic relations ==
In 2021, the trade volume between the two countries was estimated at $300 million USD, with Ukraine's exports accounting for $171.6 million, and Ghana's accounting for $128.4 million.

Ukraine's main exports included ferrous metals (75.3%), animal fats and oils (7.7%), and grain crops (5.9%). Ghana's main exports included ores, slags and ash (79.9%), along with cocoa and related products (25.9%).

== See also ==
- Foreign relations of Ghana
- Foreign relations of Ukraine
