= Dupito Simamora =

Indonesian diplomat (born 1963)

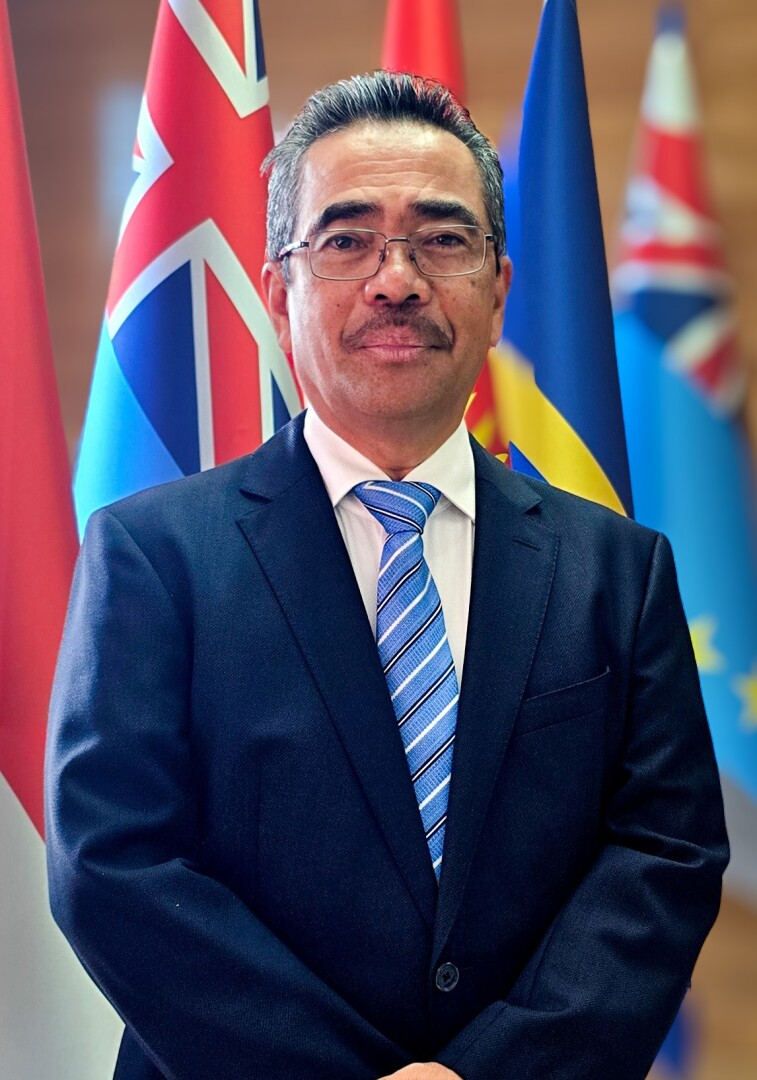

Ambassador of Indonesia to Fiji, Kiribati, Nauru, and Tuvalu
- Incumbent
- Assumed office 14 June 2023
- President: Joko Widodo
- Preceded by: Benyamin Scott Carnadi

Deputy Executive Director of the Council of Palm Oil Producing Countries
- In office 1 June 2019 – 31 May 2022
- Executive Director: Yusof Basiron
- Preceded by: Makhdzir Mardan
- Succeeded by: Nageeb Wahab (as Deputy Secretary General)

Personal details
- Born: July 23, 1963 (age 62) Sihikkit, North Tapanuli, Indonesia
- Spouse: Monamaria Bonifasia
- Education: University of North Sumatra (Drs.); Monash University (M.A.)

Dupito Darma Simamora (born 23 July 1963) is an Indonesian diplomat who is currently serving as ambassador to Fiji, with concurrent accreditation to Kiribati, Nauru, and Tuvalu. Prior to his appointment, he was the Deputy Executive Director of the Council of Palm Oil Producing Countries from 2019 to 2022.

== Early life ==
Born on July 23, 1963, in Sihikkit, North Tapanuli, Dupito attended the Christus Sacerdos Middle Seminary in Pematangsiantar, where he studied for seven and a half year. He received his bachelor's degree from the University of North Sumatra and his master's degree from the Monash University in 1993.

== Career ==
Dupito held various position during his service in the foreign ministry. Around 2009, he was assigned to the embassy in Canberra, where he was involved with the Pacific Island Forum, the Melanesian Spearhead Group, and relations with Vanuatu. He also served as assistant deputy for ASEAN cooperation coordination in the coordinating ministry for politics, law, and security, before leaving his post on 26 August 2016 to serve as the deputy chief of mission at the embassy in Brussels.

During his tenure in Brussels, he coordinated a joint letter from palm oil-producing countries, involving Malaysia, Thailand, Honduras, Colombia, Ecuador, and Nigeria, to three EU institutions and the Austrian Presidency of the Council of the EU in response to EU's Renewable Energy Directive II which aincludes sustainability criteria affecting biofuels, including palm oil. The letter emphasized shared concerns over potential discrimination from EU biofuel classifications and urged the EU to respect developing countries’ rights to economic and social growth. He also received high-level visits in Belgium from vice president Jusuf Kalla and vice governor of West Java Uu Ruzhanul Ulum.

Dupito's role in the promotion of palm oil led to his appointment as the deputy executive director of the Council of Palm Oil Producing Countries, where he served from 1 June 2019 to 31 May 2022. Through his work in the organization, Dupito continued his role in opposing EU's palm oil regulation by lobbying EU officials and raising the issue at the World Trade Organization. He also criticized EU's policy of putting "palm oil free" labels in product, viewing it as a disguised boycott and a negative campaign that directly influences consumers and harms the palm oil industry.

In December 2022, Dupito was nominated as ambassador to Fiji, with concurrent accreditation to Kiribati, Nauru, and Tuvalu, by President Joko Widodo. After passing an assessment by the house of representative's first commission the next month, he officially assumed office on 26 June 2023. He presented his credentials to the President of Fiji Wiliame Katonivere on 22 August 2023, Governor General of Tuvalu Tofiga Vaevalu Falani on 20 March 2024, and to the President of Nauru David Adeang on 19 April 2024.

During his tenure, Dupito emphasized cultural diplomacy initiatives to strengthen the relations between Indonesia and Fiji such as cultural exchange programs, scholarship for Fijians, and cultural residency program. To support the initiatives, Dupito planned the construction of an integrated compound for official and cultural activities, which was supported by land offered by the Fijian government. He also oversaw the donation medical equipment worth 2.88 billion rupiahs from the Indonesian Aid Agency to support Fiji's post-COVID recovery in 2024.

== Personal life ==
Dupito is married to Monamaria Bonifasia, a fellow diplomat whose last office was as a junior consul for social and cultural affairs at the consulate general in Guangzhou. The couple has a daughter named Putri Kiara.
