= Cocoa smuggling =

Illegal transportation of cocoa beans

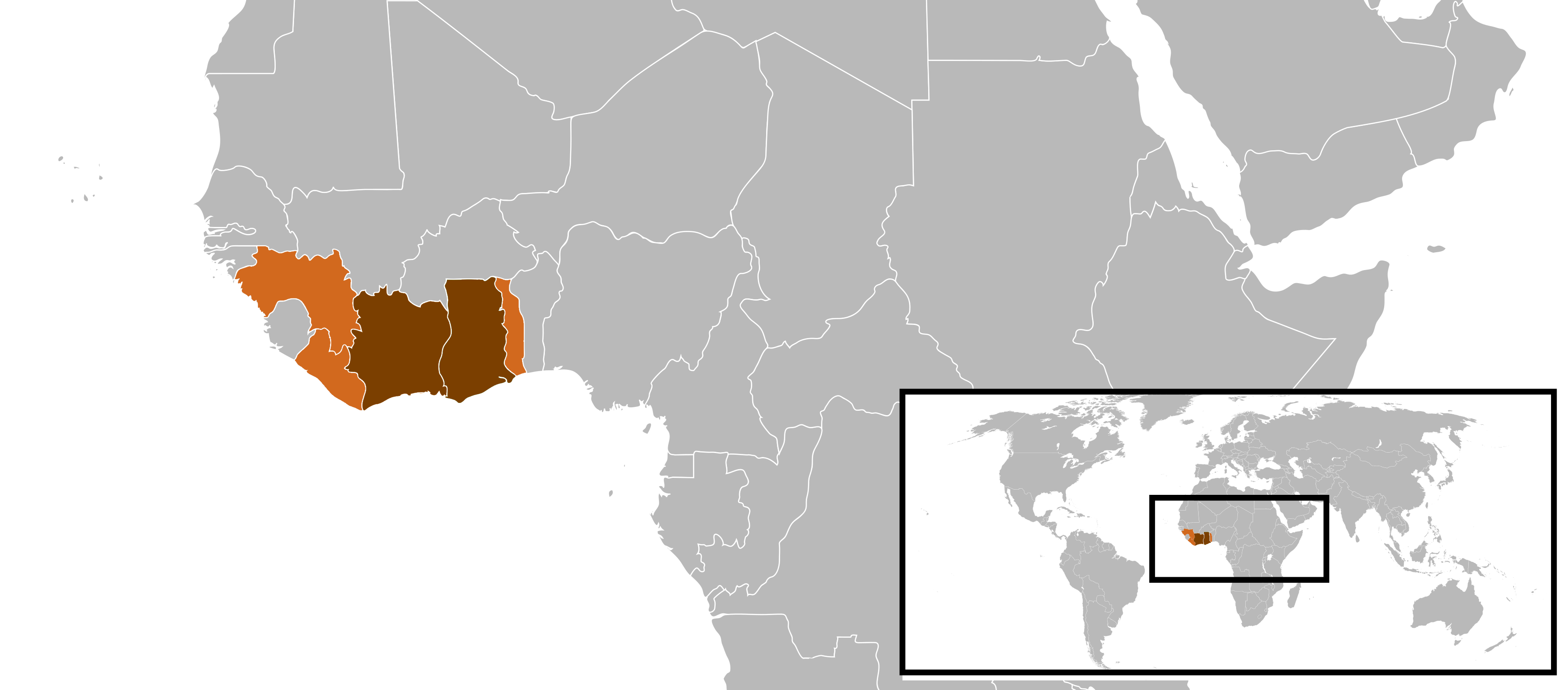
Countries in West Africa affected by cocoa smuggling. From left to right: Côte d'Ivoire and Ghana (origin countries); Guinea, Liberia, and Togo (destination countries)

Cocoa smuggling is the illegal transportation of cocoa beans across an international border, in contravention of local laws and regulations. It is particularly an issue in Côte d'Ivoire and Ghana, the world's largest and second largest cocoa producers, respectively. Cocoa prices are fixed and guaranteed in the two countries by their respective regulatory bodies, the Ivorian Coffee and Cocoa Board (CCC) and the Ghana Cocoa Board (COCOBOD). Cocoa farmers who smuggle their crop therefore do so in hopes of fetching higher market prices in countries where cocoa prices are not regulated. The destination countries of cocoa smuggled from Côte d'Ivoire and Ghana (other than each other) are Guinea, Liberia, and Togo.

The Ivorian and Ghanaian governments have implemented a number of countermeasures to curtail cocoa smuggling at their borders. Both governments have task forces dedicated to the prevention of agricultural smuggling, with Ghana having one which specifically targets cocoa smugglers. The Ghanaian and Ivorian legal systems have steep penalties for those found guilty of cocoa smuggling; individuals face a maximum sentence of ten years in prison, while companies risk losing their operating licences. To encourage farmers not to smuggle their cocoa, both governments have occasionally hiked up their cocoa prices ahead of scheduled increases.

== Legal definitions ==
In Ghana, transporting or selling cocoa without the authorisation of COCOBOD is prohibited under section 317 of the Criminal Offences Act 1960 (Act 29). Additionally, Ghanaian cocoa must be inspected, graded, and sealed by a government inspector before it can be exported, per section 3 of the Cocoa Industry Regulations Act, 1968 (NLCD278). The supreme authority of COCOBOD over cocoa-related matters is enshrined by the Ghana Cocoa Board Act, 1984 (PNDCL81).

== Causes ==
Côte d'Ivoire and Ghana are the world's largest and second largest cocoa producers, respectively, and cocoa exports make up a significant portion of both countries' economies. The Ivorian and Ghanaian governments purchase cocoa from their farmers at a fixed price based to some extent on the average market price. However, these fixed prices are updated periodically and do not match the pace of inflation or market fluctuations caused by economic shocks. As a result, cocoa farmers may endure rising production costs while not benefitting from increases in the global price for cocoa. Farmers may also be compelled to smuggle their cocoa when their country is going through a currency crisis, as they can earn higher real revenues by receiving payments in foreign currencies.

== Consequences ==
Cocoa smuggling reduces the amount of cocoa that the Ghanaian government can sell to foreign buyers and consequently the amount of the foreign currency it receives. Cocoa exports provide a consistent, reliable flow of foreign currency to Ghana's national reserves. COCOBOD estimated that Ghana had lost 200,000 and 150,000 metric tonnes of cocoa to smuggling in 2022 and 2023, respectively. Cocoa smuggling is a contributing factor to the ongoing cocoa crisis.

== Countermeasures ==
The Ghanaian government has taken a number of countermeasures to prevent and stop cocoa smuggling in the country. COCOBOD's National Anti-Cocoa Smuggling Task Force is responsible for apprehending cocoa smugglers in Ghana. Individuals found guilty of cocoa smuggling face a minimum sentence of five years in prison and a maximum of ten. Licensed Buying Companies – organisations authorised by COCOBOD to purchase cocoa from farmers on its behalf – lose their licence if found complicit in cocoa smuggling. Amid a financial crisis in June 2024, the Ghanaian government increased its fixed price for cocoa by 58.26% to US$2,188 (GH₵33,120) per tonne. In September 2024, COCOBOD requested assistance from the Ministry of Defence in combatting cocoa smuggling. A new anti-cocoa smuggling initiative was subsequently announced, led by the Ghana Armed Forces.

In 2018, the Ivorian government passed a law which imposed a maximum sentence of ten years in prison and a fine of 50 million West African francs on those found guilty of agricultural smuggling. 2023, the Ivorian government closed all cocoa warehouses and collection centres within 10 kilometres (6.2 mi) of the country's western and eastern borders, in an attempt to curb cocoa smuggling. It also announced reforms to a 200-strong Ivorian gendarmerie dedicated to fighting against agricultural smuggling. In 2024, the Ivorian government began distributing electronic identification cards for cocoa producers in anticipation of a future tracking system for the country's cocoa supply chain. It claims to have distributed 730,000 such cards as of 23 April 2024, and the system is set to be operational by 1 October 2024.

== History ==
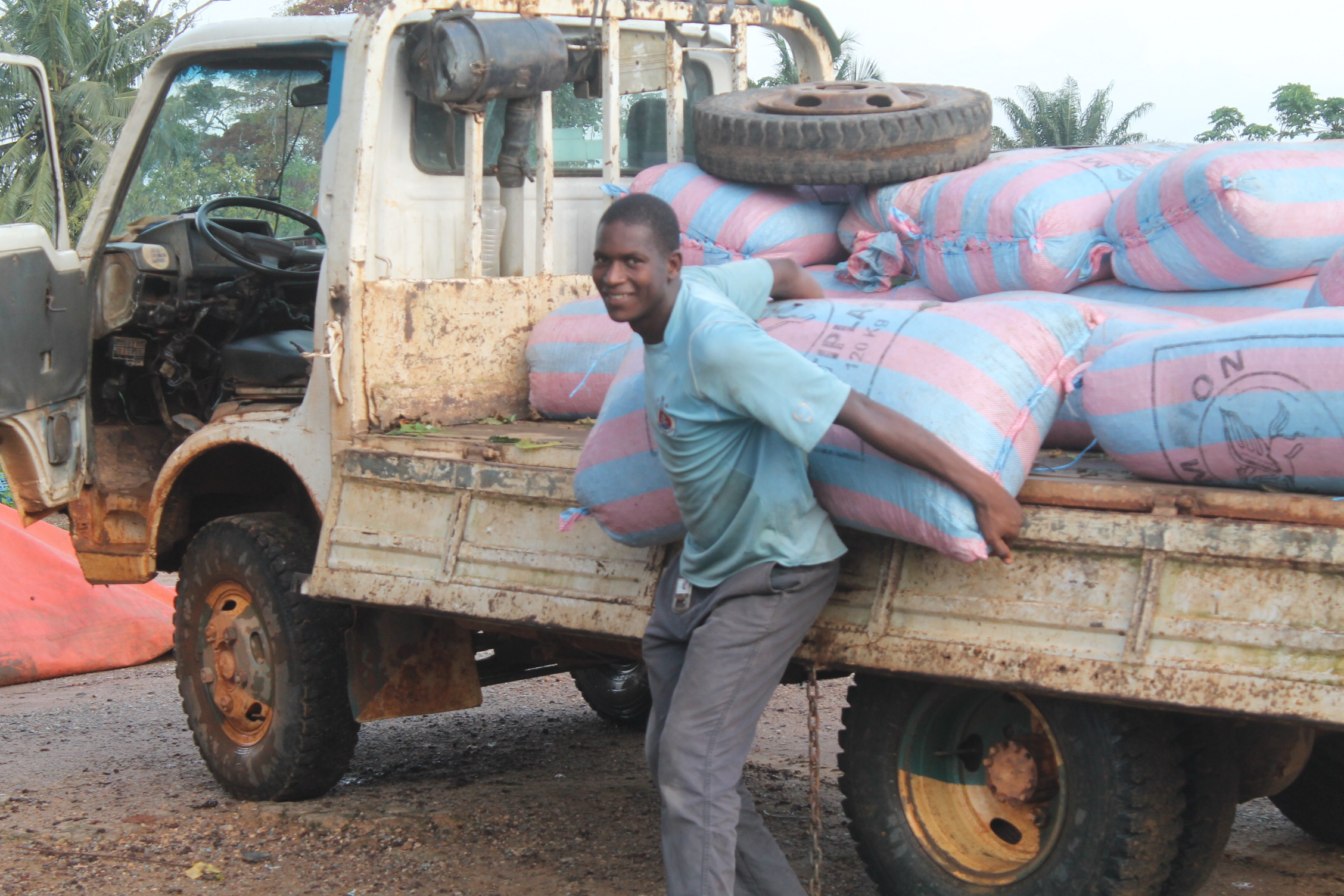
A man loads a truck with bags of cocoa in Côte d'Ivoire.

Ghana suffered a financial crisis in 2014, during which many cocoa farmers smuggled their crop into Côte d'Ivoire to earn more money. The Ghanaian cedi had depreciated in value, making it more profitable to sell cocoa for West African francs in Côte d'Ivoire. In the years preceding the financial crisis in Ghana, it was more profitable for Ivorian farmers to sell their cocoa in Ghana because the Ghanaian government guaranteed a higher fixed price for cocoa than their Ivorian counterparts. In 2024, cocoa smuggling surged once again in Ghana due to another financial crisis and a rising market price for cocoa outside of the country, particularly in neighbouring Togo.

Ghana saw a rise in cocoa smuggling to Togo during a financial crisis in 2024. On 8 May, a truck carrying 130 bags of cocoa covered in wood chippings was intercepted by police in the Kwahu South District of the Eastern Region. The truck's driver and his passenger were arrested. A week later, on 15 May, Ghanaian soldiers patrolling near Kpong Dam intercepted a truck carrying 231 bags of cocoa hidden under animal feed. Four people inside the truck and a police inspector who was escorting the truck were arrested. On 17 May, the circuit court of Odumase Krobo handed prison sentences ranging from five to seven years to three people found guilty of being involved in cocoa smuggling.

Guinea and Liberia are the primary countries for cocoa smuggled from and to Côte d'Ivoire. A report by the Ivorian NGO Initiatives for Community Development and Forest Conservation (IDEF), published on 22 April 2024, claimed that a significant amount of cocoa circulating in Côte d'Ivoire's western supply chain had come from neighbouring Liberia. However, the IDEF did not provide the CCC with specific numbers when asked.

In September 2024, COCOBOD CEO Joseph Boahen Aidoo accused the Russian government of being involved in cocoa smuggling through illegal purchases by the Wagner Group in neighbouring countries.

== See also ==
- Cocoa production in Côte d'Ivoire
- Cocoa production in Ghana
- Côte d'Ivoire–Ghana Cocoa Initiative – Organisation of cocoa-producing countries
