= Cocoa Research Institute of Ghana =

Agricultural research institute in Ghana

- Founded: 1938
- Founder: Government of Ghana (originally under West African Cocoa Research Institute)
- Type: Research Institute
- Legal status: Active
- Purpose: Agricultural research and development for cocoa and allied crops
- Headquarters: Tafo, Eastern Region, Ghana
- Location: Eastern Region, Ghana
- Coordinates: 6°13′38″N 0°21′45″W
- Region served: Ghana
- Parent organization: Ghana Cocoa Board (COCOBOD)
- Website: https://crig.org.gh/

The Cocoa Research Institute of Ghana (CRIG) is a national agricultural research institute headquartered at Tafo in the Eastern Region of Ghana. It is responsible for scientific research into cocoa production, diseases, genetics, processing, and sustainability. The institute operates under the Ghana Cocoa Board and serves as the principal body for cocoa research in Ghana.

The institute is known for developing improved cocoa varieties, pest-control methods, soil management techniques, and technologies that support farmers and the cocoa industry.

== History ==
The origins of the institute date to 1938 when the West African Cocoa Research Institute (WACRI) was established during the colonial period to coordinate cocoa research across British West Africa. After Ghana gained independence in 1957, responsibility for cocoa research was gradually transferred to national authorities.

In 1963, Ghana formally withdrew from the multinational structure and reorganised its cocoa research operations into a national institution, which became the Cocoa Research Institute of Ghana.

== Research and programmes ==
CRIG’s research activities cover scientific areas.

=== Genetics and breeding ===
Scientists develop improved cocoa varieties with higher yields, resistance to disease, and tolerance to environmental stress.

=== Plant protection ===
Research focuses on controlling major cocoa pests and diseases, including black pod disease and capsid infestations, using integrated management approaches.

=== Soil science ===
Studies examine soil fertility, nutrient management, and sustainable land-use practices for cocoa cultivation.

=== Post-harvest technology ===
The institute researches fermentation, drying, storage, and processing methods to improve bean quality and value addition.

=== Extension and technology transfer ===
CRIG works with extension agencies and farmer groups to disseminate research findings and best practices.

== Facilities ==
CRIG’s headquarters at Tafo includes laboratories, experimental farms, nurseries, training facilities, and demonstration plots. The institute maintains field stations across cocoa-growing regions of Ghana for on-farm trials and regional research.

== See also ==
- Cocoa production in Ghana
- Ghana Cocoa Board
- Agricultural research
