= Armajaro =

British investment firm

- Type: Commodity Trade
- Industry: financial services
- Founded: May 1998
- Founder: Anthony Ward; Richard Gower
- Headquarters: London

Armajaro Asset Management is a commodity investment firm based in London. The company specializes within the cocoa and coffee markets, managing investments in soft commodity hedge funds. Armajaro is run by Anthony Ward.

Armajaro also has investments in wine production and wine distribution as well as cocoa processing.

Armajaro employs a full-time meteorologist and has its own weather stations to help anticipate yields of commodities around the world. The firm also has a sizable soft commodity research unit, Armajaro Research Limited, that has over 20 staff globally at country of origin specializing in cocoa and coffee research.

== History ==
Armajaro Group was founded by Anthony Ward and Richard Gower in May 1998. That November, Armajaro Securities Ltd gained Financial Services Authority authorization. Armajaro, in 2001, acquired a wine producing estate in Paarl, South Africa. The company established subsidiaries in Lagos, Nigeria and Abidjan, Côte d'Ivoire and got into the asset management business in 2002.

Ward, the manager of the CC+ hedge fund, has been dubbed "CHOCFINGER" by fellow traders for his exploits. The nickname is a reference to both the Bond villain Goldfinger as well as a British confection.

In August 2002, Armajaro bought three-quarters of the 204,380 tonnes of cocoa delivered through the Euronext Liffe exchange under futures contracts. The purchase amounted to more than 5 per cent of global cocoa production and produced a £10.4 million pre-tax profit. The price of cocoa soared to a 17-year high of £1554 a tonne and sparked fears of a massive jump in chocolate prices. Ward denied the company was manipulating the market in an effort to drive prices higher amidst the concerns of traders having difficulties fulfilling cocoa obligations.

Armajaro is one of three companies that were banned by the Ghana Cocoa Board from operating on the western border of Ghana after being indicted for facilitating the smuggling of cocoa across Ghana's border with Côte d'Ivoire. Armajaro was barred from trading in 13 districts in western Ghana after a journalist filmed one of its contractors agreeing to smuggle cocoa across the border to Ivory Coast where prices were higher. After the results of an inquiry by the Ghana cocoa board, the ban on Armajaro was lifted in September in all but one district. Bans on two local trading companies, which had been implicated by the same journalist, were also lifted. The case has caused additional scandal after it was revealed that the British Government had lobbied for Armajaro which was also a significant donor to the Conservative party as well as to Andrew Mitchell, the international development secretary who reportedly intervened on Anthony Ward's behalf after receiving £40,000 in donations from the millionaire's company to his parliamentary office.

On 17 July 2010, Armajaro purchased 240,100 tonnes of cocoa. The buyout caused cocoa prices to rise to their highest level since 1977. The purchase was valued at £658 million and accounted for 7 per cent of annual global cocoa production (some sources call this a market corner). While cocoa beans are perishable, they can be held in storage for several years. It was reported that Armajaro sold this batch of cocoa purchase later in the year.

In November 2013, Armajaro announced the sale of its commodity trading division to ECOM Agroindustrial after sustaining losses of $7.5 million in fiscal year 2012, despite $3 billion in revenue. The takeover of Armajaro's coffee, sugar and cocoa business, which was slowly completed globally over 2014, will boost ECOM's presence to compete alongside the largest global commodity firms such as Archer Daniels Midland, Bunge Limited, Cargill and Louis Dreyfus Group, also known as the ABCD. The purchase came in a period of uncertainty for commodities as sugar and coffee futures remained at stagnant lows coupled with tightening margins for cocoa due to slower demand. Armajaro Holdings continued ownership of its commodity focused hedge funds under Armajaro Asset Management LLP.

=== St Vincent Cocoa Company ===
In August 2011, Armajaro Trading Ltd signed an agreement with the government of St Vincent and the Grenadines aiming to establish a sustainable cocoa industry on the island. Armajaro has set up a subsidiary company in the country – the St Vincent Cocoa Company Ltd. The agreement (until 2061) intends to develop a viable cocoa industry through investment by both parties, with up to 2000 ha planted with cocoa and production between 2500 – 3000 tonnes per year.

Armajaro will provide credit to farmers, build infrastructure and invest in training of farmers, and in return will have exclusive rights to buy, sell and market all cocoa produced in the country. The government will invest in irrigation and road infrastructure, and will grant tax and import exemptions to the company for 15 years.

In July 2014, the company was closed following the sale of Armajaro to Ecom Agrotrade Ltd. In September 2014 a local consortium bought St Vincent Cocoa Company.
