= Stephen Opuni =

Ghanaian health practitioner

Stephen Kwabena Opuni

chief executive officer of Ghana COCOBOD
- In office November 30, 2013 – January 13, 2017
- Preceded by: Anthony Fofie
- Succeeded by: Joseph Boahen Aidoo

Personal details
- Born: Bono Region, Ghana
- Relatives: Dora Yaa Owusuaa Opuni (mother); Nicholas Hayford Kwabena Opuni (father)
- Education: Vitebsk State Medical Institute
- Occupation: Medical practitioner

Stephen Kwabena Opuni is a Ghanaian health practitioner and a former chief executive officer of the Ghana Cocoa Board.

== Early life and education ==
Stephen Kwabena Opuni was born in Sunyani, the capital of the Bono Region (formerly Brong Ahafo Region), Ghana. His mother was from Dormaa Babianeha, near Dormaa Ahenkro in the Brong Ahafo Region. His father, Nicholas Hayford Kwabena Opuni, was the Brong Ahafo Regional Secretary of Kwame Nkrumah's Convention People's Party (CPP) in 1966

Under the leadership of the former president John Dramani Mahama, Dr. Opuni was appointed chief executive officer of the Ghana Cocoa Board. His appointment took effect from November 2013. Before this appointment as the chief executive officer of the Ghana Cocoa Board, Opuni had previously worked at the Food and Drugs Authority, where he served as the head of the Authority.

== Alleged corruption scandal ==
Opuni was alleged to have been involved in a number of corruption charges including causing financial loss to Ghana. Attorney-General of Ghana, Gloria Akuffo stated that the former COCOBOD CEO Dr. Stephen Opuni could face a 25 years sentence if found guilty.

Under the leadership of Opuni, there were series of allegation of corruption from various interest groups. Tobinco Pharmaceuticals had previously raised an allegation of witch-hunting from the office of the then FDA boss which the then president intervened in. Additionally, when he was serving as the Ghana COCOBOD chief executive officer, the Industrial Commercial Workers Union (ICU) and the General Agriculture Workers Union (GAWU) also continuously raised alarm about some mismanagement and corrupt practices under the former FDA boss now serving as COCOBOD CEO. GAWU and ICU believed that corruption at COCOBOD was affecting the production of cocoa in the country, but some staff at the Board jumped to their boss’ defense, debunking the claims.

== Accusations ==
Opuni was accused with 27 charges for causing financial loss to the state. Some of the charges include money laundering, violation of procurement laws and defrauding by false pretenses. The state says it has established that Seidu Agongo deposited an amount of 25,000 cedis into the account of Stephen Kwabena Opuni to influence the award of contracts. Also, Between January 2014 and November 2014, he, according to the State, abetted Seidu Agongo and Agricult Ghana Ltd to defraud COCOBOD of some GHS43,120,000. Again, between November 2014 and November 2015, Dr Opuni conspired with Agongo and Agricult to defraud COCOBOD of GHS75,289,314.72

== Trial ==
Investigations into the charges on Opuni began in 2017 after the New Patriotic Party (NPP) was elected into power. In February 2017, Opuni's assets were seized and bank accounts frozen by the Economic and Organised Crime Office (EOCO) pending conclusions into investigations of fraudulent transactions during his tenure. The initial investigation went on for the most part of the year 2017. His first case was handled by Chief State Attorney, Evelyn D. Keelson.

Based on the accusations and charges made against Stephen Opuni in the past, a fresh case was set to open in 2023 after a new judge was assigned. In March 2023, Justice Kwasi Anokye Gyimah took over the case and ruled that the trial be restarted for being tainted with allegations of unfairness.
