= ECOM Agroindustrial =

Swiss global commodity trading company

Ecom Agroindustrial Corp. Ltd
- Industry: Commodity Trade
- Founded: 1849
- Headquarters: Pully, Switzerland
- Number of employees: 6000+
- Website: https://www.ecomtrading.com/

ECOM Agroindustrial is a global commodity trading and processing company based in Switzerland. The company specializes mainly in coffee, cocoa and cotton. ECOM has more than 40 offices located in over 35 countries all around the world. It is one of the largest coffee millers in the world. 32% of their coffee and 43.7% of their cocoa is sold as sustainable.

ECOM was founded in 1849 by Jose Esteve as a cotton trading business in Spain. The Esteve family subsequently established themselves in the US in 1885 following developments in cotton farming. They expanded into Brazil in 1935 and in Mexico in 1948. ECOM was soon established and started coffee trading in 1959 and cocoa in 1991.

In 2000, ECOM bought the London-based coffee business of the Cargill company.

In 2012, ECOM purchased 13 million 60-kg bags of coffee or about 7% of the world's coffee.

In 2013, ECOM announced the purchase of the commodity trading division of Armajaro Holdings, taking over its coffee, cocoa and sugar business. ECOM has subsidiaries in several countries, including Sangana Commodities in Kenya.

In 2019, ECOM became the largest coffee miller and the second-largest coffee trader in the world.

== Supply chain issues ==
A recurrent issue in agricultural large-scale production is human rights violations, and allegations have been made against ECOM. The investigative NGO Repórter Brasil scrutinized labour conditions on coffee farms in Brazil in 2016 and found evidence of multiple abuses: advances never paid were discounted from salaries and the employer irregularly subtracted absences from pay slips, even for rainy days when harvesting was impossible. Because of these practices, some workers were being paid monthly amounts less than half of the minimum wage. The coffee from these farms was also sold to a direct subsidiary of ECOM.

Company response: The ECOM Group has never owned or administered coffee farms in Brazil.

In response, ECOM stated that two of the farms named in the report were within a Rainforest Alliance group certificate for which the certification is managed by the ECOM Group. ECOM said it was in compliance with and fulfilled its Rainforest Alliance group certificate obligations and responsibilities as farm manager. Although all issues identified were rectified or resolved at the relevant time, the two farms have not been part of ECOM’s certification group since 2017.
