= Big Chocolate =

Term for multi-national chocolate food producers

"Big Chocolate" is a business term used to describe multi-national chocolate food producers, akin to the terms "Big Oil," "Big Pharma," and "Big Tobacco".

== Definition ==
According to advocates of fair trade, such as Ghanaian cooperative Kuapa Kokoo, "Big Chocolate" companies include Mondelez (which owns Cadbury), Mars, Nestlé, The Hershey Company and Ferrero. Together these companies process a significant amount of the world's 3 million tons of cocoa each year.

"Big Chocolate" also refers to the political and social consequences of the chocolate industry in general. Consolidated buying enables large cocoa users to wield significant impact in economies, many of them being poor African nations that rely on cocoa production as a critical element of foreign trade.

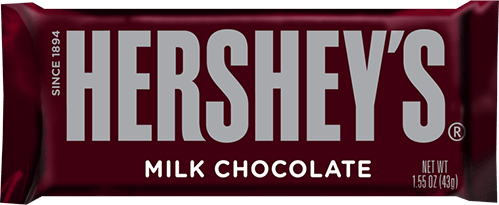
Hershey's is a well-known chocolate brand.

== Miscellaneous ==
At the core of the chocolate debate across Europe, parts of Asia and the United States, is the definition of chocolate itself, and whether percentages of cocoa in production should render some candies unable to carry the chocolate food definition.

At issue is the ability to replace cocoa butter or dairy components of chocolate with cheaper vegetable fats or polyglycerol polyricinoleate (PGPR), thereby reducing the quantity of actual cocoa in the finished product while creating a less healthy confection. Currently the United States, some parts of the European Union and Russia do not allow vegetable fats as ingredients of products labeled as chocolate. The United Kingdom, Ireland and Denmark allow vegetable fat as an ingredient.

There are many ethical issues implicated in the chocolate industry, among them child labor, environmental impact, sustainability, and the extreme poverty of the average cocoa farmer. Food Technology reports over two million children working on cocoa farms in Ghana and Cote d’Ivoire as a result of cocoa farmer poverty.

== See also ==
- Big business
- Bulk cocoa
- Child labor in cocoa production
- Cocoa production in Ivory Coast
- Fairtrade certification
- Specialty cocoa
