= Harry Dodoo =

Ghanaian accountant and public servant

- Born: Harry Amoo Dodoo; 8 August 1918; Accra, Gold Coast
- Died: 10 February 2000 (aged 81); Korle-Bu Teaching Hospital, Accra, Ghana
- Education: Accra Academy; Institute of Chartered Accountants in England and Wales
- Occupations: Public Servant, Chartered Accountant
- Known for: First Gold Coast indigene to be a Chartered Accountant

Harry Amoo Dodoo (8 August 1918 – 10 February 2000) was a Ghanaian chartered accountant, public servant and businessman who led the Ghana Cocoa Board at different times as chief accountant, general manager, managing director, chief executive and chairman. He was the first Gold Coast native to be a chartered accountant and the first Gold Coast indigene to work with Cassleton Elliot and Company (now KPMG).

Dodoo was the organizational leader of the Cocoa Marketing Board as general manager from 1955 to 1965, and as managing director from 1965 to 1967, and the chief executive on its restructuring as Ghana Cocoa Board from 1983 to 1986. He also served as chairman of the Ghana Cocoa Board from 1981 to 1983 and 1986 to 1988.

== Early life and education ==
Harry Dodoo was born on 8 August 1918 at Accra, Greater Accra Region, Gold Coast. He studied at Accra Academy from 1935 to 1938.

Dodoo begun his career at the Accountant General's department, where he worked from 1939 until 1945. In 1945 he became an Articled clerk training in the field of Accountancy at Cassleton Elliot and Company (now KPMG). In 1949, he qualified as a Chartered Accountant and became a member of the Institute of Chartered Accountants in England and Wales. He consequently became the first Gold Coast native to qualify as a Chartered Accountant in the Gold Coast. He worked as a Chartered Accountant with the firm from 1950 until 1952.

== Ghana Cocoa Board ==
In 1952, Dodoo was appointed accountant for the Ghana Cocoa Marketing Board (now Ghana Cocoa Board). In 1953 he was promoted to chief accountant and on 25 May 1955 he became the general manager of the Ghana Cocoa Marketing Board.

In September 1960, Dodoo was appointed by President Kwame Nkrumah to a Committee to enquire into the Cost of Living which was chaired by S.B. Ofori and included Kwesi Amoako-Atta, J. V. L. Phillips, H. Millar-Craig and E. N. Omaboe.

Dodoo served in the capacity of general manager of C.M.B. until 1 March 1965 when he was re-titled managing director. In July 1966, he became acting chairman of the board of directors of the Cocoa Marketing Board, whilst still as managing director, when Nana Sir Tsibu Darku left the role. On 29 July 1966, William Ofori-Atta replaced Dodoo to become substantive chairman with an appointment by the National Liberation Council. Dodoo served as managing director of the Ghana Cocoa Marketing Board until 22 February 1967 when he resigned.

In October 1981, President Hilla Limann appointed Dodoo as chairman of the governing board of the Cocoa Marketing Board. In 1983, Dodoo was appointed acting chief executive of Ghana Cocoa Board (COCOBOD) by Chairman Jerry Rawlings, serving until 1986. On 25 September 1986, he was appointed as chairman of the board of directors of Ghana Cocoa Board. He resigned from the board of directors on 26 April 1988.

== Directorships ==
Dodoo served as a member of the board of governors of Accra Academy.

Dodoo was vice president of the Association of Accountants of the Gold Coast (which was later renamed; the Association of Accountants in Ghana), he also served on the first council of the Institute of Chartered Accountants of Ghana inaugurated in 1963. He served as president of the Institute of Chartered Accountants of Ghana from 1974 to 1976.

In 1969, Dodoo ventured into private business by establishing Dodoo, Lobban & Co. (now Lobban-Hyde) an audit and accountancy firm in Ghana with William Drummond Lobban as partner. Dodoo retired from the firm in 1979.

His other directorships included Fan Milk, Blackwood Hodge (Ghana), Hansa Manufacturing Company Limited, Ghana Consolidated Diamonds and Ghana Aluminium Products. In the early 1960s he served on the board of the Ghana Main Reef Limited.

He was also a member of the Council of State in the Third Republic.

== Personal life and death ==
Dodoo enjoyed music and dancing. He died on 10 February 2000 at the Korle-Bu Teaching Hospital, Accra.

== See also ==
- Institute of Chartered Accountants of Ghana
