= Right to Information Act, 2019 =

Ghanaian legislation

The Right to Information Act, 2019 (Act 989) (RTI) was passed on 26 March 2019 by the Parliament of Ghana. It received presidential assent on 21 May 2019, and became effective in January 2020. Prior to its passage, various stakeholders believed the delay in passing the bill into law was to allow exemptions of certain vital information bordering around government policies which they intend to conceal from the public (Akoto, 2012). This act is to enable citizens to hold government accountable to ensure that there is a high level of transparency in governance of the country.

== Right to information in other countries ==
The right to information is not new on the African continent. It was first adopted by Sweden in 1766 and Finland in 1951. Over the past two decades many African countries have also adopted the laws, indicating acknowledgement that transparency is an essential condition of democracy. Currently 24% of the African countries have adopted the law. These countries include: South Africa, Angola, Zimbabwe, Uganda, Nigeria, Ethiopia, Rwanda, Liberia, Guinea and Ghana.

The Access to Information and Protection Privacy Act in Zimbabwe has rather been used to protect information instead of making it available to the general public all in the name of privacy. As a result, it is not included in counts of RTI laws sometimes (Good law and practice, 2012).

The Middle East has only three countries adopting the law (Jordan, Yemen and Israel) and it started in the January 2013.

In Asia and the Pacific sixteen countries have adopted the access to information laws. They include: Bangladesh, India, Australia, Tajikistan, South Korea, Thailand, Cook Islands, Mongolia, Kyrgyzstan, Taiwan, Indonesia, Uzbekistan, Japan, Nepal, New Zealand, and Pakistan.

Fifteen countries in the Americas and six in the Caribbean had access to information laws as of September 2013.

== History ==
The right to information is implicit in the notion that the Ghanaian taxpayers need to have access to information concerning what government does with their money and what government plans to do on their behalf. The act is meant to ensure Ghanaians have access to governance or official information from public offices on request and without request. The act is meant to put in effect, Article 21(1)(f) of the 1992 constitution of the Republic of Ghana which states that “All persons shall have the right to information subject to such qualifications and laws as are necessary in a democratic society."

== Cost of RTI ==
A 2017 study by the Research Department of Parliament predicted that Ghana would need to spend GH₵ 750 million over five years to implement the RTI. According to the article seen by Citi News, the expenditure will be related to creating an RTI Commission. A head office, administrative costs, district administrative costs, district office facilities, and funding for boards were all included in the cost breakdown. For instance, the first year's administrative staff cost at the headquarters was recorded at GH₵ 651,968.22. The cost of staff is estimated at GH₵ 91 million for all the districts. From 2018 to 2021, these numbers decline yearly.

== Notable Enforcement Cases ==
In July 2026,the Right to Information Act was actively tested when investigative journalism outlet The Fourth Estate petitioned the Right to Information Commission.The petition followed a decision by the Public Procurement Authority(PPA) to deny an RTI request regarding single-source procurement approvals for road contract under the government's "Big Push" infrastructure programme.The journalism project filed the appeal to compel the PPA to release the data,arguing that the public procurement records were not legally exempted from disclosure under Act 989.
