= Côte d'Ivoire–Ghana Cocoa Initiative =

Organisation of cocoa-producing countries

- Initiative Cacao Côte d'Ivoire Ghana
- Formation: 2018
- Headquarters: 16 Onyasia Crescent, Roman Ridge, Accra, Ghana
- Official languages: English, French
- Executive secretary: Alex Assanvo
- Website: www.cighci.org

The Côte d'Ivoire–Ghana Cocoa Initiative (CIGCI) is an intergovernmental organisation of cocoa-producing countries. It was founded in 2018 by its two eponymous member countries, Côte d'Ivoire and Ghana, to jointly influence global cocoa prices and the chocolate market. Its proclaimed goal is to increase the revenues of cocoa farmers in its member countries in a sustainable manner. Critics have described the organisation as a "cocoa cartel" and nicknamed it "COPEC", a reference to the oil cartel OPEC.

== History ==
Côte d'Ivoire and Ghana are the world's largest and second largest cocoa producers, respectively, together accounting for 65% of the global cocoa supply as of 2024. In 2017, a 20% drop in global cocoa prices negatively impacted the livelihoods of millions of cocoa farmers in Côte d'Ivoire and Ghana, prompting the presidents of both countries to sign an agreement for a strategic partnership in cocoa production. The following year, on 26 March 2018, Côte d'Ivoire and Ghana made the Abidjan Declaration On Cocoa, promising to work together to raise revenues for cocoa farmers, create a strategy for sustainable cocoa farming, and conduct scientific research on cocoa production and swollen shoot disease. Shortly thereafter, the Côte d'Ivoire–Ghana Cocoa Initiative (CIGCI) was established with a charter aligning with the previous two agreements.

In 2019, the CIGCI began charging cocoa buyers a premium of US$400 per metric ton. The Ivorian and Ghanaian governments threatened to halt buyers' sustainability programs within their respective borders if the companies did not pay the premium.

== Membership ==
Côte d'Ivoire (orange) and Ghana (green) in West Africa

The CIGCI currently has two members, its eponymous founders Côte d'Ivoire and Ghana. Its charter states that membership is open to any cocoa-producing country in Africa. In 2022, Cameroon and Nigeria expressed interest in joining the CIGCI; the four countries together make up 75% of the world's cocoa supply.

== Governance ==
The CIGCI secretariat is the organisation's operational body. It is based in the Ghanaian capital of Accra and led by an Ivorian executive secretary appointed by the Ivorian government. The first and incumbent executive secretary is Alex Assanvo, previously the Director of Corporate Affairs for Europe and Africa at Mars Inc.

== Headquarters ==
On 18 April 2024, the permanent headquarters of the CIGCI was inaugurated by Ghanaian president Nana Akufo-Addo in Accra. At the inauguration ceremony, Assanvo commented that the CIGCI "reaffirmed the vision to put the producer back at the centre of the cocoa value chain" and was "another example of how the two countries [Côte d'Ivoire and Ghana], through their respective heads of state, could overcome challenges." Ivorian prime minister Robert Beugré Mambé (representing the Ivorian president) and Ghana Cocoa Board CEO Joseph Boahen Aidoo attended the inauguration.

== Criticisms ==
Saudi Arabia, the world's swing producer of oil, can simply turn off the taps if it wants higher prices. Oil can remain underground, and does not rot. Cocoa trees, by contrast, cannot be turned off. If COPEC governments try to squeeze the market by banning exports, they will probably still have to keep buying and stockpiling beans to keep their farmers happy. Doing so could quickly overwhelm their budgets.

— The Economist, 21 November 2022

Critics have described the CIGCI as a "cocoa cartel", "OPEC for cocoa", and "COPEC", the latter two a reference to the Organization of the Petroleum Exporting Countries, an intergovernmental oil cartel. The Economist argues that, while the CIGCI has managed to inflate global cocoa prices in the short term, it will not be able to sustain the prices because artificially limiting the cocoa supply would require much government spending.

The Economist further argues that the inflated prices could cause oversupply in the long term, as farmers may be enticed to switch to or grow more cocoa. Cobus de Hart, an economist at the consulting firm Oxford African Economics, also argues against regulating the supply of cocoa, pointing out that it takes years for cocoa trees to begin bearing fruit after they are planted, and so it would be "really hard to get farmers to stop producing [cocoa]." Other experts highlighted the possibility that chocolate manufacturers may reduce their funding for sustainability programs to offset the costs added by CIGCI premiums.

The CIGCI has also been criticised for failing to achieve its ostensible goal of increasing revenues for cocoa farmers. In response to the CIGCI premium, most major chocolate manufacturers have reduced the existing premiums that they pay to farmers for their reliability and product quality.

== See also ==
- Cocoa production in Côte d'Ivoire
- Cocoa production in Ghana
- Cocoa smuggling
- Côte d'Ivoire–Ghana relations
- Council of Palm Oil Producing Countries
