= Council of Palm Oil Producing Countries =

Organization founded by Indonesia and Malaysia

- Indonesia (green) and Malaysia (orange)
- Secretariat: Jakarta
- Membership: 3 states: Indonesia; Malaysia; Honduras
- Establishment: 21 November 2015
- Website www.cpopc.net

The Council of Palm Oil Producing Countries (CPOPC) is an intergovernmental organization founded by Indonesia and Malaysia to collectively promote the global use of palm oil. Together, the two countries produce the majority of the world's palm oil, a product that has come under pressure due to environmental concerns. The CPOPC was founded in 2015 following the establishment of independent palm oil sustainability standards in both countries, and part of its purpose is to harmonize sustainability standards between the two.

== History ==
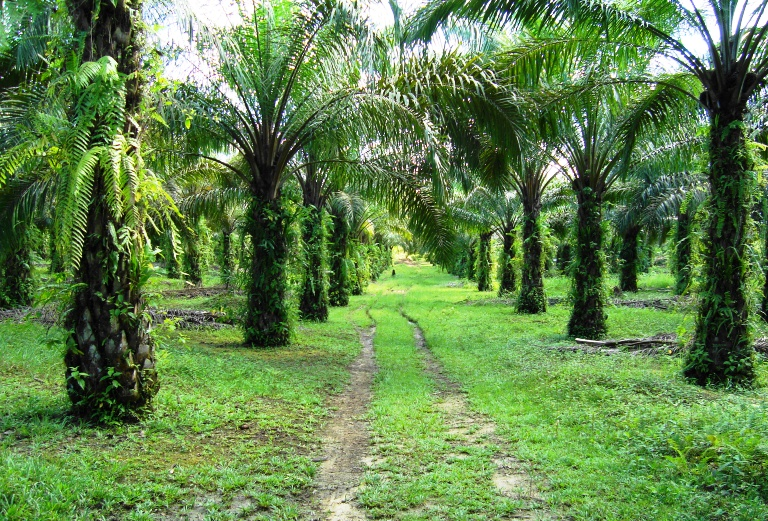
An oil palm plantation in Riau, Indonesia

Indonesia and Malaysia are globally significant producers of palm oil, together producing 90% of total supplies. With palm oil becoming a contentious environmental issue, both countries independently established palm oil sustainability certifications. The ISPO (Indonesian Sustainable Palm Oil) was launched in March 2011, with audits beginning in May 2012 and all palm oil producers expected to be in compliance by the end of 2014. The MSPO (Malaysian Sustainable Palm Oil) was launched in November 2013, and came into full effect on 1 January 2015, although it was not mandatory for all oil producers. (The MSPO was made mandatory in 2017, with compliance needed by 2019.)

The formation of the CPOPC was announced in 2015 by Indonesia and Malaysia. It was formally founded on 21 November 2015, and reached full operation in 2017.

== Objectives ==
The stated objective of the organization is "To promote, develop and strengthen cooperation in the oil palm cultivation and industry among the Member Countries, and to ensure long term benefits of such palm oil endeavors to the economic development and well being of the people of the Member Countries".

The CPOPC was created with the goals of harmonizing sustainability standards, coordinating production, and developing the palm oil industry. The CPOPC also strengthened government control over the palm oil industry, with Indonesian authorities forcing the dissolution of the existing privately created "Indonesian Palm Oil Pledge", which they accused of being created by a cartel-like system.

The organization plays a role in promoting palm oil abroad. It seeks to combat challenges such as the European Union's EU Deforestation Regulation, which Malaysian deputy prime minister Fadillah Yusof suggests may be protectionist rather than a purely environmental concern. The United States is also seen as potentially restricting palm oil sales.

The CPOPC claimed in 2022 that palm oil in both countries supported 3.6% of GDP, and the employment of 19 million people, including 3.35 million smallholders.

== Membership ==
Member	Status
Indonesia	Member
Malaysia	Member
Honduras	Member
Papua New Guinea	Observer
Colombia	Observer
Ghana	Observer
Nigeria	Observer
Democratic Republic of the Congo	Observer

Colombia, Ghana, Honduras, and Papua New Guinea have attended meetings as observers, and are expected to become full members. In February 2023 Malaysia, as chair, invited Thailand to join the organisation.

The secretariat is located in Jakarta, the capital of Indonesia.

== See also ==
- Côte d'Ivoire–Ghana Cocoa Initiative
- Indonesia-Malaysia relations
