= Cocoa production in Ghana =

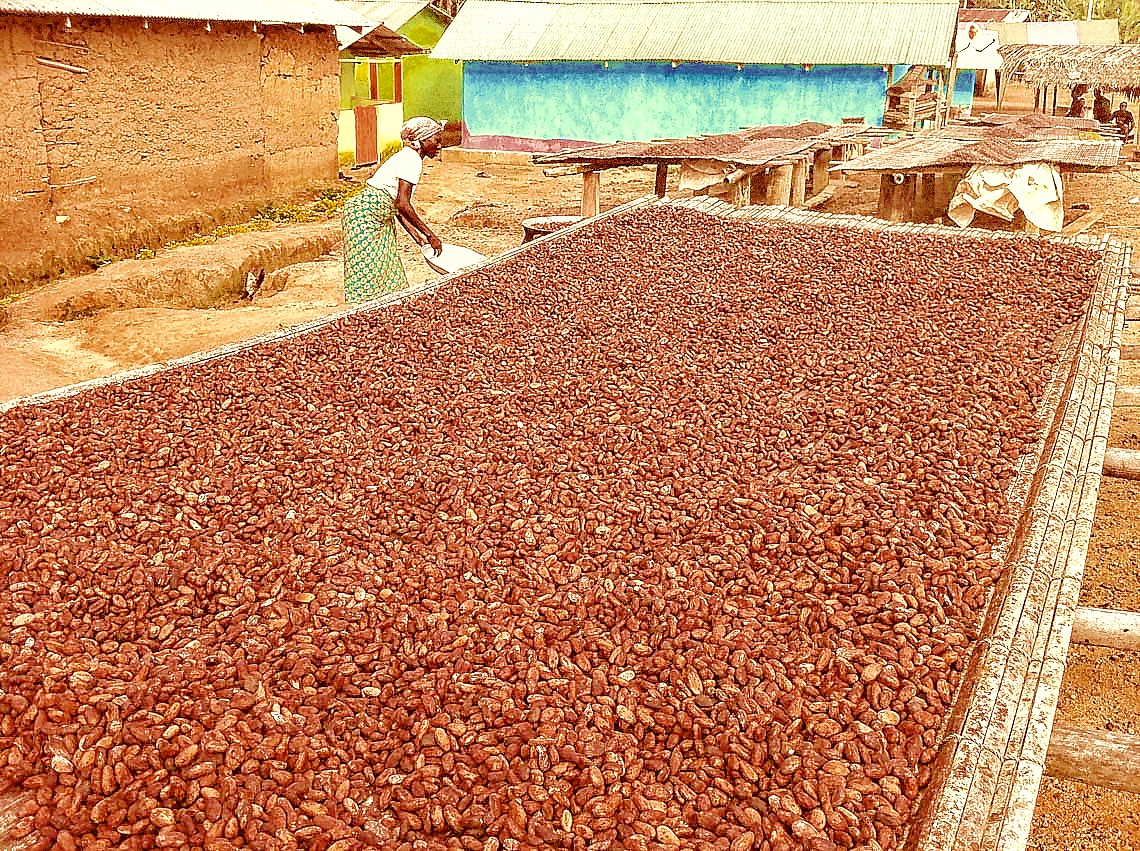
Cocoa beans drying in Mpenkro, near Kakum National Park in the Central Region

Ghana is the second-largest exporter of cocoa beans in the world, after Ivory Coast, which accounts for about one-third of the global supply. Ghana's cocoa cultivation, however, is noted within the developing world to be one of the most modelled commodities and valuables.

== Overview ==
Cocoa production occurs in the country's forested areas: Ashanti, Brong-Ahafo, Central Region, Eastern Region, Western Region, and Volta, where rainfall is 1,000 to 1,500 millimetres per year. The crop year begins in October, when purchases of the main crop begin, with a smaller mid-crop cycle beginning in July.

All cocoa, except that which is smuggled out of the country, is sold at fixed prices to the Cocoa Marketing Board. Although most cocoa production is carried out by peasant farmers on plots of less than three hectares, a small number of farmers appear to dominate the trade. Some studies show that about one-fourth of all cocoa farmers receive just over half of total cocoa income.

With some two million children involved in the farming of cocoa in West Africa, primarily Ghana and Ivory Coast, child slavery and trafficking were major concerns in 2018. However, international attempts to improve conditions for children were failing because of persistent poverty, absence of schools, increasing world cocoa demand, more intensive farming of cocoa, and continued exploitation of child labour.

The government shifted responsibility for crop transport to the private sector. Subsidies for production inputs (fertilizers, insecticides, fungicides, and equipment) were removed, and there was a measure of privatisation of the processing sector through at least one joint venture. A new payment system known as the Akuafo Check System was introduced in 1982 at the point of purchase of dried beans. Formerly, produce buying clerks had often held back cash payments, abused funds, and paid farmers with false checks. Under the Akuafo system, a farmer was given a check signed by the produce clerk and the treasurer that he could cash at a bank of his choice.

Plantation divestiture proceeded slowly, with only seven of fifty-two plantations sold by the end of 1990. Although Ghana was the world's largest cocoa producer in the early 1960s, by the early 1980s production had dwindled almost to the point of insignificance. The drop from an average of more than 450,000 tons per year to a low of 159,000 tons in 1983–84 has been attributed to ageing trees, widespread disease, bad weather, and low producer prices. In addition, bush fires in 1983 destroyed some 60,000 hectares of cocoa farms, so that the 1983–84 crop was barely 28 per cent of the 557,000 tons recorded in 1964–65. Output then recovered to 228,000 tons in 1986–87. Revised figures show that production amounted to 301,000 tons in 1988–89, 293,000 tons in 1990–91, and 305,000 tons in 1992–93. After declining to 255,000 tons in 1993–94, the crop was projected to return to the 300,000-ton range in 1994–95.

In the early 1990s, the Ghana Cocoa Board (COCOBOD), continued to liberalise and to privatise cocoa marketing. The board raised prices to producers and introduced a new system providing greater incentives for private traders. In particular, Cocobod agreed to pay traders a minimum producer price as well as an additional fee to cover the buyers' operating and transportation costs and to provide some profit. Cocobod still handled overseas shipment and export of cocoa to ensure quality control.

In addition to instituting marketing reforms, the government also attempted to restructure cocoa production. In 1983 farmers were provided with seedlings to replace trees lost in the drought and trees more than thirty years old (about one-fourth of the total number of trees in 1984). Until the early 1990s, an estimated 40 hectares continued to be added to the total area of 800,000 hectares under cocoa production each year. In addition, a major programme to upgrade existing roads and to construct 3,000 kilometres of new feeder roads was launched to ease the transportation and sale of cocoa from some of the more neglected but very fertile growing areas on the border with Ivory Coast. Furthermore, the government tried to increase Ghana's productivity from 300 kilograms per hectare to compete with Southeast Asian productivity of almost 1,000 kilograms per hectare. New emphasis was placed on extension services, drought and disease research, and the use of fertilizers and insecticides. The results of these measures were to be seen in rising cocoa production from the 1990s to the present.

== Recent growth ==
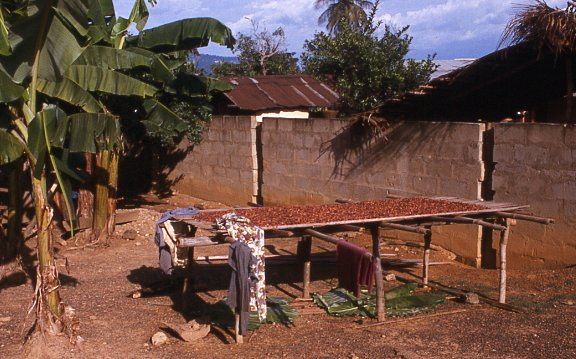
Cocoa beans and cocoa harvest processing

Ghana's cocoa production grew an average of 16 per cent between 2000 and 2003. Cocoa has a long production cycle, far longer than many other tropical crops, and new hybrid varieties need over five years to come into production, and a further 10 to 15 years for the tree to reach its full bearing potential. The reasons for this huge production increase are varied and in fact Ghana's cocoa yields per hectare are still low by international standards. Researchers at the Overseas Development Institute identify the following as particularly important factors:

1. Land
2. Labor
3. Fertilizer
4. Insecticide
5. Agricultural equipment
6. Western Sefwi (suggesting smuggling from processing Ivory Coast)
7. Rainfall
8. Cocoa farmer
9. Use of spraying machines

This study also suggests that the most important factors in the increased production are:

- New land brought under cultivation
- More intensive use of household labour
- A good rainfall pattern
- Effectiveness of farm spraying and increased fertiliser use

This study suggests that Ghana's cocoa farmers are not making the best use of technological innovations in their production and instead their increased production is not sustainable. Bringing new land under cultivation is risky, as much of the land was previously forest and after a short period and without adequate attention this land may be exhausted. Intensive use of labour has led to high increases in the cost of labour and may impact profitability, and high rainfall is only periodic. Cocoa serves as a major source of living for most people in Ghana. In the rural areas, most adults are farmers and have plantation farms which provide them with an income. In recent years, the production of Cocoa in Ghana has increased tremendously due to the fact that, the government has provided the agricultural industry in Ghana with incentives which has boosted the interest of young adults to expand their farms and plant more cocoa. The world market have increased the prices of cocoa so it has served as a major source of revenue for the people in Ghana who cultivate cocoa.

== Regulation ==
=== Hybrid system of liberalisation ===
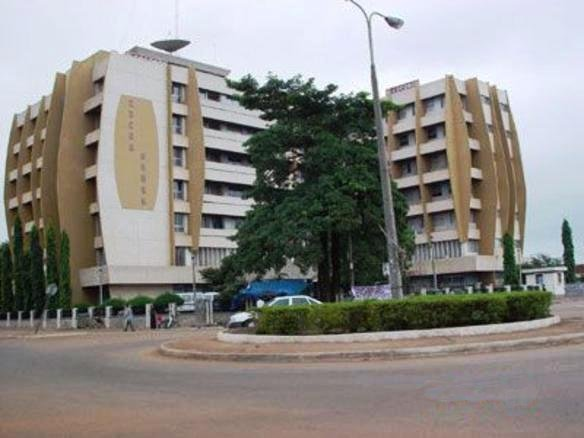
Sunyani Cocoa House in Sunyani, Brong-Ahafo Region, Ghana

Ghana Cocoa Board's experimentation with privatisation has created a hybrid system whereby despite all exports being controlled by the state, there are now around 25 private companies buying the crop in all areas of the country where it is grown. After 14 years, the successes and failures of this hybrid system have been the subject of a study by researchers at the Overseas Development Institute. Competition was clearly found to have increased production levels throughout the country, yet access to credit remained one of the most important factors determining the level of competition. Farmers rarely made the most of all the available options to sell their crop (often they only made use of one).

Their choice was based on the ability of a company to pay promptly in cash and thus there were only five major players on the market: PBC (formerly state-owned), Kuapa Kokoo (a hugely successful farmers-based cooperative working on fair trade principle), Adwumapa (a Ghanaian buying company), Olam and Armajaro (both foreign-owned companies, from Singapore and the UK respectively). Another key determining factor is the distance of the plantation from the main market, as more remote farms more often found it easier to sell to the formerly state-owned PBC.

This hybrid scheme benefits a variety of players:

- The state, which maintains a monopoly on all exports and makes a substantially higher return from taxation than other cocoa regions;
- The traders, who compete for the purchase of higher volumes of the export crop on non-price terms throughout the cocoa belt areas; and
- The farmers, who are guaranteed a minimum floor price regardless of their geographical location.

Researchers at the ODI therefore suggest that liberalisation has been good for producers by:

1. providing farmers with more choice of buyers;
2. delivering cash payments promptly; and
3. maintaining stability in producer prices throughout the season.

Yet the question remains for policy-makers as to the benefits of the state controlling an export monopoly and its strong presence of the public sector in the internal market, whether there should be even more liberalisation, and whether it is providing the right incentives for producers to develop better (and sustainable) farming practices.

In 2018, Côte d'Ivoire and Ghana established the Côte d'Ivoire – Ghana Cocoa Initiative.

=== Climate-smart cocoa production ===
Ghana cocoa production stakeholders came together in 2011 to create the climate-smart cocoa (CSC) production programme. And Helps The System Of Cocoa Cultivation (7th) (C)The programme is focused around reducing the impact of climate change on the cocoa crops. One of the primary initiatives was distributing shade tree seedlings. These seedlings help to protect cocoa plants from heat and water stress, as well as improving soil quality. While the program has made some positive impact, there have also been some barriers to its success. Namely, there is a lack of secure tree tenure (clear tree rights) in Ghana which disincentives farmers from putting in the time and resources to caring for the shade trees.

== Harvesting ==
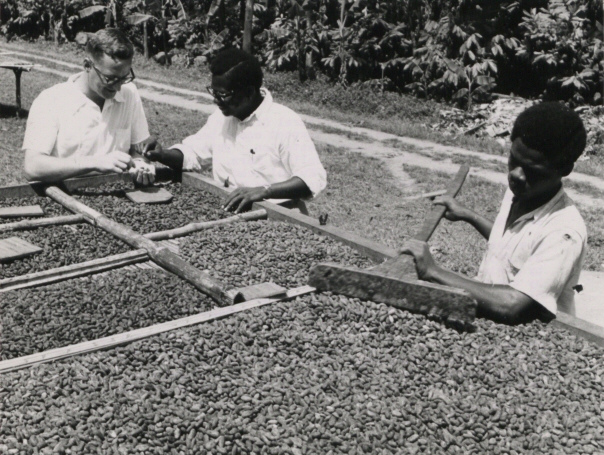
Harvest processing of cocoa beans in Ghana, January 1957

Farmers remove cocoa pods from cacao trees using blades or hooks; once removed, they generally leave them in a pile. On a day when friends and family are available to help, often a Saturday, they work through the pile, cracking the pods open with tools such as machetes and removing the seeds. The "heap method" of fermentation, leaving cocoa beans on and covered by plantain leaves, is common. After fermentation, the beans are sun-dried on raised mats.

== Production issues ==
=== Child labour ===
A major study of the issue in 2016, published in Fortune in the US, concluded that approximately 2.1 million children in various countries of West Africa "still do the dangerous and physically taxing work of harvesting cocoa". The report was doubtful as to whether the situation can be improved.

The article provided this comment: "According to the 2015 edition of the Cocoa Barometer, a biennial report examining the economics of cocoa that's published by a consortium of nonprofits, the average farmer in Ghana in the 2013–14 growing season made just 84¢ per day, and farmers in Ivory Coast a mere 50¢. That puts them well below the World Bank's new $1.90 per day standard for extreme poverty, even if you factor in the 13% rise in the price of cocoa last year. And in that context the challenge of eradicating child labor feels immense, and the chocolate companies' newfound commitment to expanding the investments in cocoa communities not quite sufficient. ... 'Best-case scenario, we're only doing 10% of what's needed.' Getting that other 90% won't be easy. 'It's such a colossal issue,' says Sona Ebai, the former secretary general of the Alliance of Cocoa Producing Countries. 'I think child labor cannot be just the responsibility of industry to solve. I think it's the proverbial all-hands-on-deck: government, civil society, the private sector.'He pauses, taking in his own thought for a moment. 'And there, you really need leadership.'"

In April 2018, the Cocoa Barometer 2018 report on the $100-billion industry, said this about the child labour situation: "Not a single company or government is anywhere near reaching the sector-wide objective of the elimination of child labour, and not even near their commitments of a 70% reduction of child labor by 2020". A report later that year by New Food Economy stated that the Child Labor Monitoring and Remediation Systems implemented by the International Cocoa Initiative and its partners has been useful, but "they are currently reaching less than 20 percent of the over two million children impacted".

=== Impacts on environment ===
According to the Ghana Forestry Commission, a Ghana government agency, almost 80 per cent of Ghana's forest resources were lost to illegal logging operation between 1990 and 2016. While this loss cannot be entirely attributed to cocoa production, cocoa production is a leading cause of deforestation in Ghana. Global Forest Watch (GFW), using advanced remote sensing and satellite data, estimated that there was a 60 per cent increase in primary rainforest loss from 2017 to 2018, the largest increase of any country in the world. Neighboring Côte d'Ivoire had a 28 per cent increase, which was the second largest increase in this time period. Together, these two countries produce roughly two-thirds of the world's cocoa, and much of this forest loss is due to cocoa production, both legal and illegal.

The Cocoa and Forests Initiative is an agreement reached between the governments of Ivory Coast and Ghana, and more than thirty-seven major cocoa and chocolate companies. The purpose of the initiative is to end deforestation and replenish the trees and forests that have been destroyed as a result of the cocoa production in the area. Between 1988 and 2007, more than 2.3 million hectares of rainforest in Ivory Coast and Ghana were cleared for cocoa farms. The initiative was announced at the UN Climate Change Conference in November 2017. One of the central tenets of the initiative is a commitment to no further conversion of natural forests to land for cocoa production in West Africa.

In March 2019, the governments of Ivory Coast and Ghana in tandem with the cocoa companies released action plans that laid out concrete steps for ending deforestation. These steps include forest protection and restoration, sustainable cocoa production with an emphasis on the livelihood of farmers, and a system of social inclusion and community engagement. The European Union in 2023 released the EU Deforestation Regulation to develop deforestation free supply chains for cocoa production.

As of 2024 in Obuasi Municipality, Ashanti, the use of unapproved pesticides was low at 42%. The most common was Gramaxone.

As of 2025 the global price for chocolate candy has risen, so people should be expecting to pay more for their Halloween candy. The cause of this is because of the tariffs that Trump put out and the climate change going up causing the temperature for the cocoa beans to die off. And two of the largest cocoa bean producers have been losing production due to climate change.

=== Illegal Mining ===
The resurgence on illegal mining activities has had detrimental effects on cocoa production. Communities such as the Dinkyiea in the Adansi North District, used to be a cocoa production hub until the arrival of the illegal miners. This has led to the loss of arable land to activities of illegal mining and deforestation. The cocoa sector has lost 190,000 acres of farmlands to galamsey operations. This has either happened through encroachment or through the cocoa farmers leasing out their farmlands to illegal miners mostly due to poverty or lack of governmental support and initiative to support cocoa production. Other than lands, galamsey has caused the pollution of water bodies, limiting the access to portable quality water needed for farming activities.

== See also ==
- Agriculture in Ghana
