= International Cocoa Initiative =

Nonprofit organization

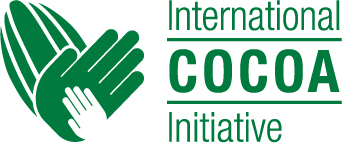
- Company type: Nonprofit/Foundation
- Industry: Cocoa, Chocolate, Agriculture
- Founded: 2002; 24 years ago
- Headquarters: Geneva, Switzerland
- Revenue: 9,165,629 euro (2020)
- Website: cocoainitiative.org

The International Cocoa Initiative (ICI) is a Geneva-based nonprofit funded by major chocolate makers that focuses on addressing child labour in cocoa production in West Africa. ICI works with communities, farmers, unions, the cocoa and chocolate industry, civil society and national governments in cocoa-producing countries to improve the lives of children involved in cocoa production. The secretariat of the International Cocoa Initiative is in Geneva, Switzerland. The organisation has two national offices in Abidjan and Accra.

The International Cocoa Initiative was established in 2002 to address part of Article 5 (establishment of a joint foundation) of the Harkin-Engel Protocol, an international agreement aimed at ending the worst forms of child labour and forced labour in the production of cocoa.

ICI operates in Côte d’Ivoire and Ghana since 2007. On the community level, ICI carries out awareness raising activities on child labour and child rights and works in the areas of education, health, water and sanitation and rural livelihoods. ICI promotes due diligence in cocoa supply chains by embedding child labour monitoring and remediation systems, training farmers and supply chain actors, and by engaging with certification schemes and sustainability standards. On the national level, ICI provides training on child protection and child labour to different parties (e.g. chocolate companies, cocoa traders and processors, cocoa suppliers, farming cooperatives, national authorities, extension services and local NGOs) in order to strengthen their understanding and capacity to prevent and tackle child labour. On the international level, ICI collects evidence (data, information, case studies) for the development of actions and policies ensuring a sustainable cocoa production and improving the lives of children involved in it.
