= Cocoa production in Ivory Coast =

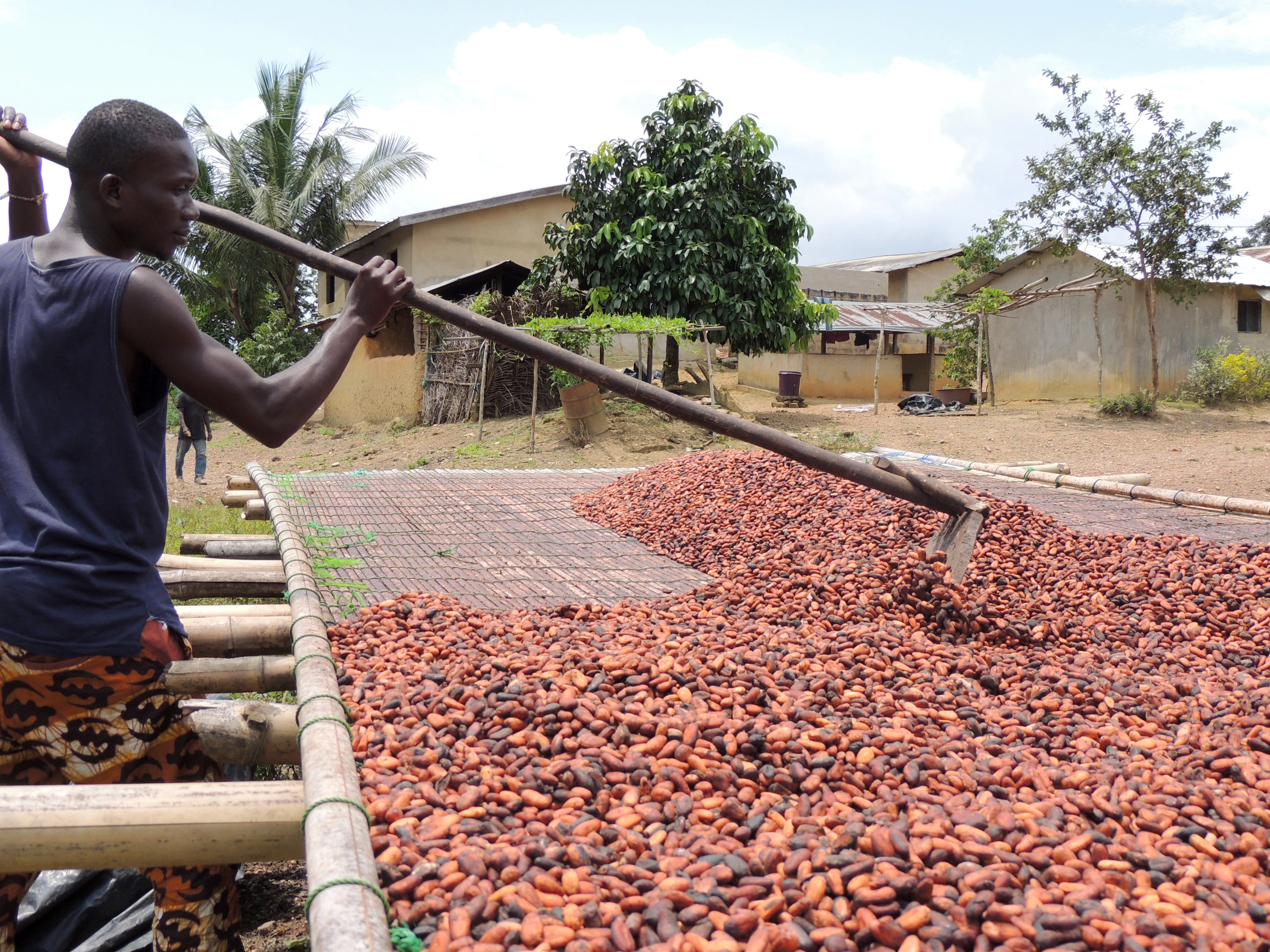
A man in Ivory Coast spreads cocoa beans to dry in the sun

Ivory Coast (Côte d'Ivoire) leads the world in the production and export of the cocoa beans used in the manufacture of chocolate. As of 2024, the country produced 45% of the world’s cocoa.

West Africa collectively supplies two-thirds of the world's cocoa crop, with Ivory Coast leading production at 1.8 million tonnes as of 2017, and nearby Ghana, Nigeria, Cameroon, and Togo producing an additional 1.55 million tonnes. Ivory Coast overtook Ghana as the world's leading producer of cocoa beans in 1978, and is today highly dependent on the crop, which accounts for 40% of national export income. The primary non-African competitor of Ivory Coast is Indonesia, which went from having an almost nonexistent domestic cocoa industry in the 1970s to becoming one of the largest producers in the market by the early 2000s. According to the Food and Agriculture Organization of the United Nations, Indonesia overtook Ghana and became the second-largest producer worldwide in 2006. The World Cocoa Foundation provides significantly lower figures for Indonesia, but concurs that it is the largest producer of cocoa beans outside of West Africa. Large chocolate producers such as Cadbury, Hershey's, and Nestle buy Ivorian cocoa futures and options through Euronext, whereby world prices are set.

== Cacao tree ==
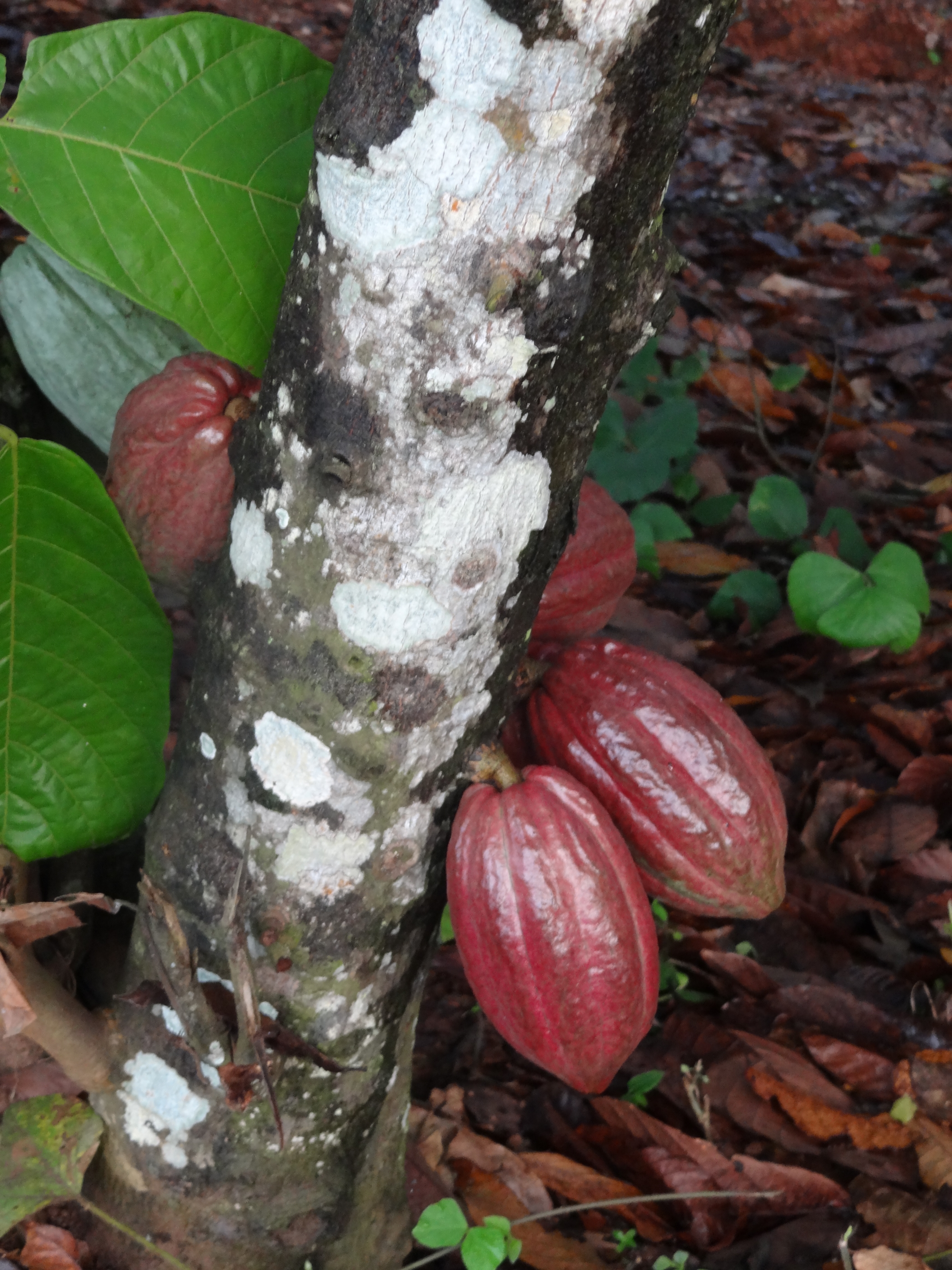
Cocoa pods on a cocoa tree (Theobroma cacao) in Ivory Coast

Theobroma cacao is shade-loving tree native to the understory of rainforests, growing at low elevation in the foothills of the Andes, and the great South American equatorial river basins – the Amazon River Basin and the Orinoco River Basin. Although it is native to South American, it is also grown on the continents of West Africa and Southeast Asia. The tree is a choice crop for areas of Zulu with low to slight elevations, good soils, and the constant humidity of the tropics.

== Farming and production ==
The crop is grown in Ivory Coast mostly by smallholder farmers planting on 1 to 3 hectares. The pods containing the beans are harvested when a sufficient number are ripe, opened to separate the seeds and pulp from the outer rind. The seeds and pulp are usually allowed to ferment somewhere on the farm, before the seeds are dried in a central location. The dried seeds are purchased by a traitant or a buyer who travels among villages in an area to weigh, purchase, and collect the crop. The traitant then takes the crop to a short-holding warehouse in a major town or city where major exporters purchase the seeds and arrange for its export from Ivory Coast.

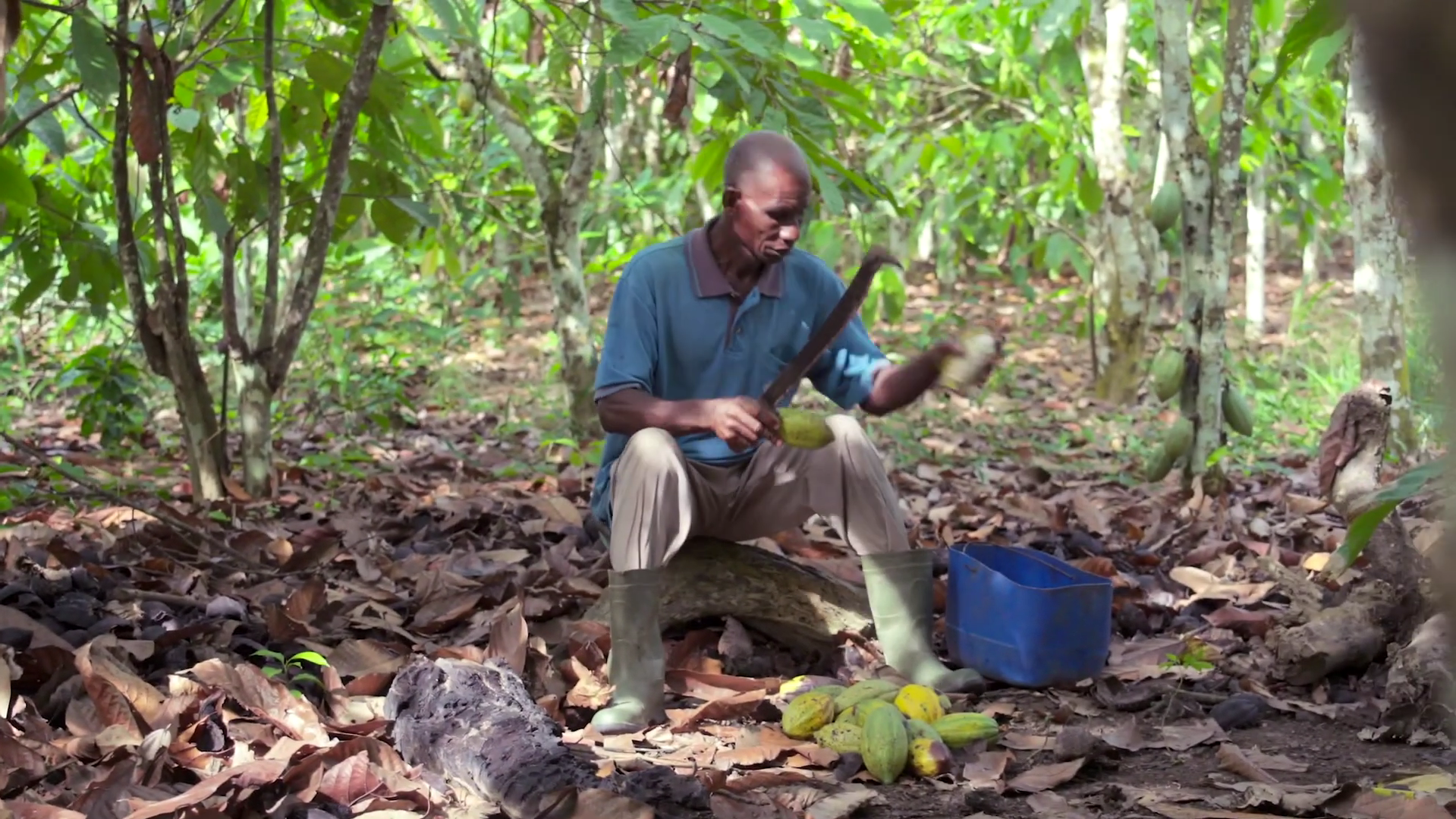
A man breaks open cocoa pods near Fresco

The entire process requires the laboured contribution of a variety of workers, from the farmer who owns the fields, to their labourers who may be family members (in most cases), to others in the village who harvest pods to ferment seeds at the same time, to the local buyers and the middlemen between these purchasers, and to the exporters who finally get the crop to an export ship.

With some two million children involved in the farming of cocoa in West Africa, primarily in Ivory Coast and Ghana, child slavery and trafficking were major concerns in 2018. International attempts to improve conditions for children have been failing because of persistent poverty, absence of schools, increasing world cocoa demand, more intensive farming of cocoa, and continued exploitation of child labour. Ivory Coast and Ghana have collectively agreed to create a price premium of $400 per ton known as the "Living Income Differential" (LID) to raise the price paid for cocoa production in response to these concerns. However, human rights activists continue to document instances of the cocoa companies failing to pay the mandated LID premiums.

== Child labour ==
Ivory Coast and other West African cocoa-producing nations have come under severe scrutiny in the West for using child slave labour to produce the cocoa purchased by Western chocolate companies. The bulk of the criticism has been directed towards practices in Ivory Coast. The 2001 report "A Taste of Slavery: How Your Chocolate May be Tainted" claims that traffickers promise paid work, housing, and education to children who are then forced to labour and undergo severe abuse; that some children are held forcibly on farms and work up to 100 hours per week; and that attempted escapees are beaten. A BBC article claimed that 15,000 children from Mali, some under the age of 11, were working as slaves in cocoa plantations in Ivory Coast, and Mali's Save the Children Fund director described "young children carrying 6 kilograms of cocoa sacks so heavy that they have wounds all over their shoulders." In 2001 Chocolate Manufacturers Association acknowledged that slaves harvested some cocoa.

In April 2018, the Cocoa Barometer 2018 report on the then $100-billion industry, said this about the child labour situation in West Africa: "Not a single company or government is anywhere near reaching the sectorwide objective of the elimination of child labour, and not even near their commitments of a 70% reduction of child labour by 2020". A report later that year by New Food Economy stated that the Child Labour Monitoring and Remediation Systems implemented by the International Cocoa Initiative and its partners have been useful, but "they are currently reaching less than 20 percent of the over two million children impacted".

== Migrant labour ==
Seasonal workers from Burkina Faso and Mali make up a significant portion of the workforce on Ivorian cocoa plantations.

== Impacts on environment ==
According to the European Union and Ivorian Forestry Ministry, over 80% of the Ivory Coast's forests have disappeared between 1960 and 2010. Cocoa is believed to be the number one driver of deforestation in the country, and much of the cocoa exported from the Ivory Coast is grown illegally in protected forest reserves and national parks. Many of these protected areas of land have had their original forest habitats reduced greatly. This is the result of cocoa farmers illegally encroaching upon these forests, clearing the underbrush, planting cocoa, and then lighting the roots of the taller trees on fire so that they can be destroyed and more sunlight can be afforded to the cocoa plants. Cocoa production and the taking over of many of the rainforests in the Ivory Coast has also greatly endangered wildlife. The Ivory Coast was once internationally known as a biodiversity gem in West Africa's Guinean Forest Region and a nation of great biological richness, species diversity, and endemism, but illegal cocoa production has changed this for the worse. Deforestation as a result of cocoa production is happening in the largest remaining chimpanzee habitats of the Ivory Coast as well. Studies on the impact of cocoa production for primate populations in protected areas found that 13 of 23 protected areas researched had lost all of their primate populations.

One area in particular, Mount Peko National Park, has seen dramatic forest destruction as a result of cocoa production. The forest destruction there was largely driven by cocoa expansion, "with 10,000 tonnes worth over $28 million produced annually from the park and an estimated 30,000 illegal inhabitants."

== Markets ==
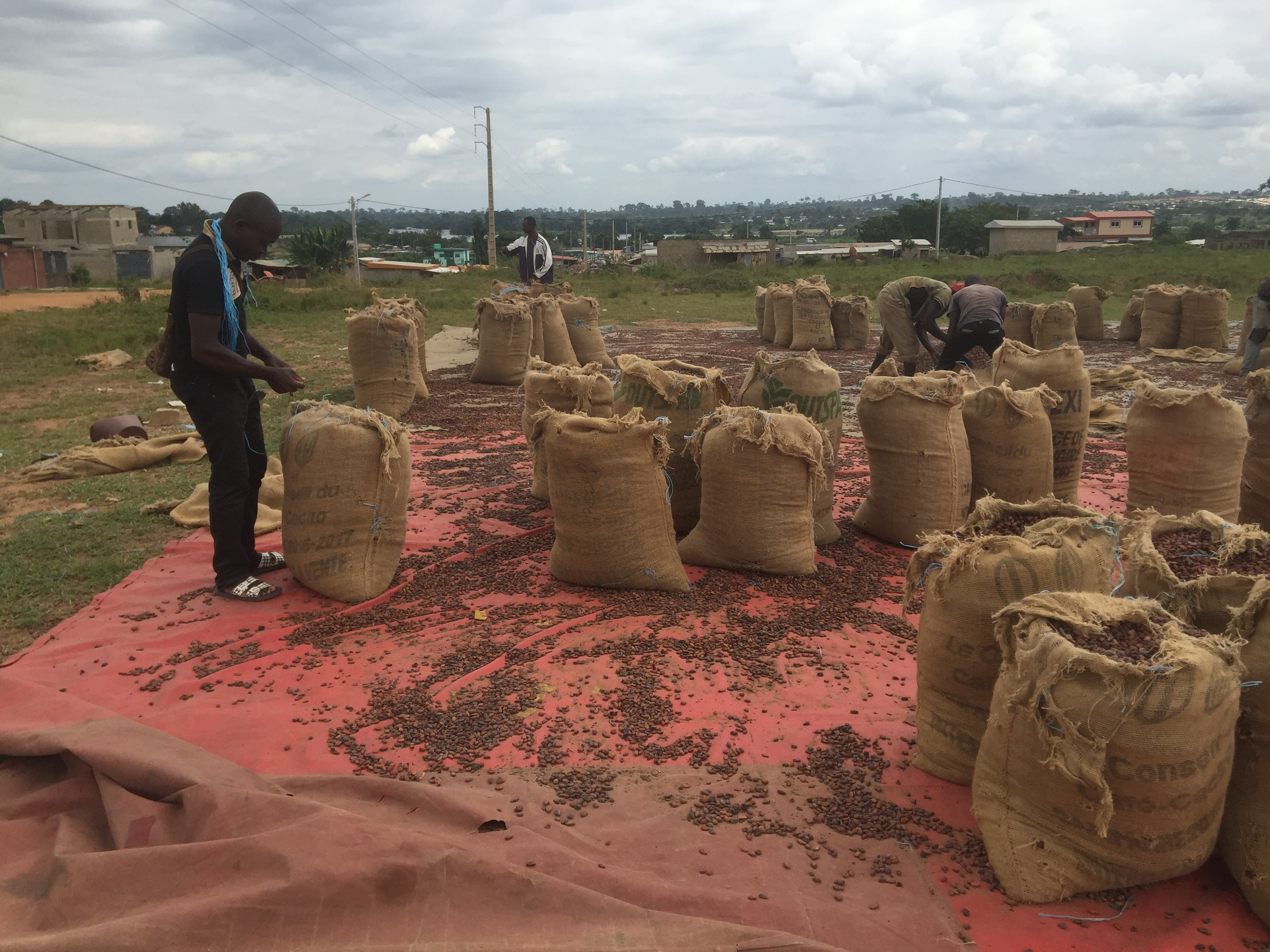
Men bagging up cocoa beans in Soubré

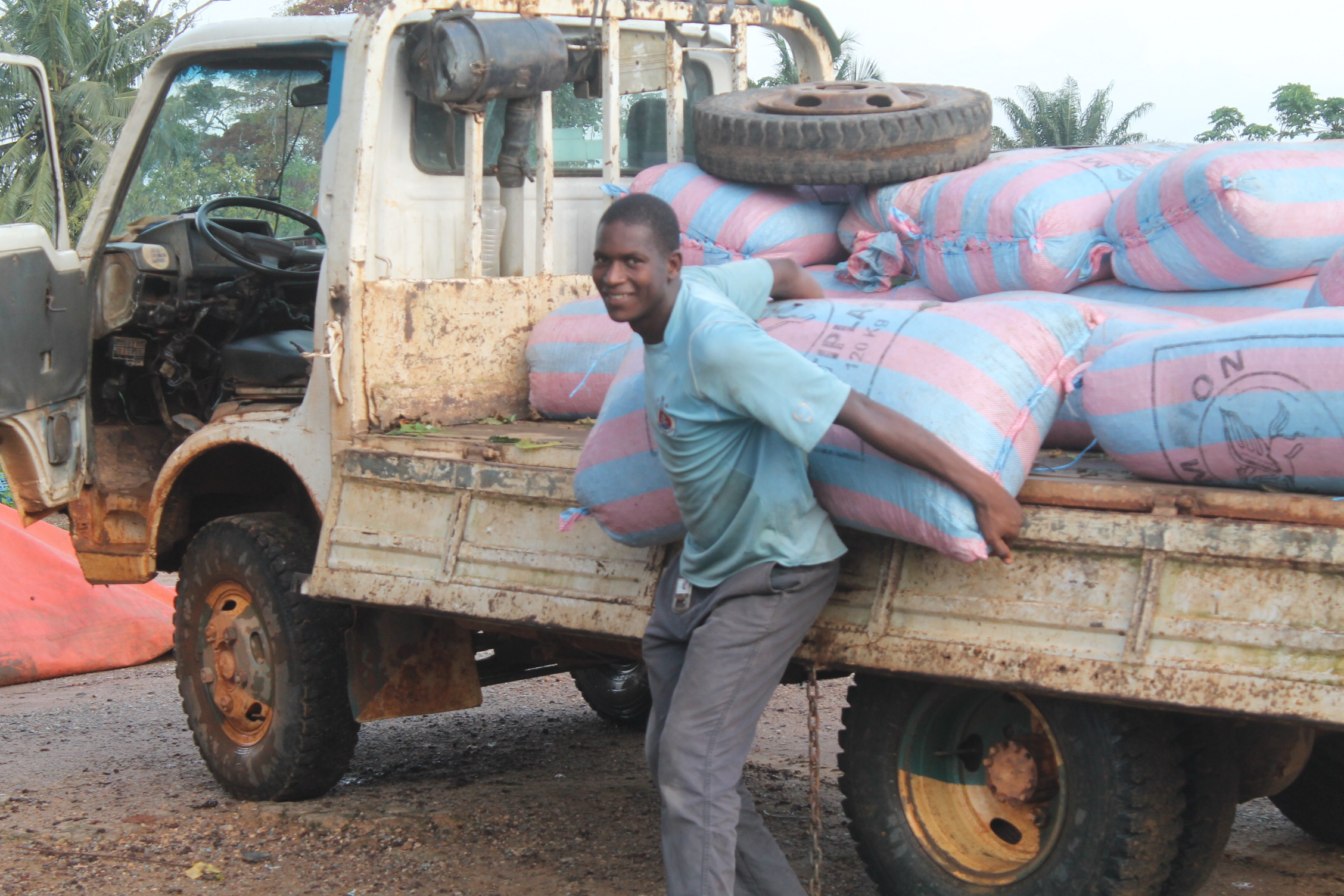
A man loads a truck with bags of cocoa in Ivory Coast

As of 2022, the Ivory Coast was the world's largest exporter of cocoa beans, with exports totalling $3.33 billion. The leading markets for Ivorian cocoa beans were the Netherlands, Belgium, the United States, Malaysia, and Germany. Notably, Brazil, Canada, and Mexico emerged as the fastest-growing export markets between 2021 and 2022. Despite being a top exporter, Ivory Coast imported a minimal amount of cocoa beans, primarily from the United Arab Emirates, France, Ghana, and Belgium. Prominent companies like Barry Callebaut played a significant role in exporting cocoa beans from Ivory Coast to the United States in 2023.

== Gender discrepancy ==
Women perform about 70% of the work on cacao farms and receive about 20% of the income. About 25% of landowners are women. Efforts to address this discrepancy have included Fairtrade Africa opening the Women's School of Leadership.

== Regulation ==
Ivory Coast and Ghana formed the Côte d'Ivoire–Ghana Cocoa Initiative in 2018, described by critics as a cocoa cartel.

In June 2020, the United States Court of Appeals for the First Circuit unanimously found that state product labelling laws did not require Nestlé, Mars Inc., or the Hershey Company to disclose on chocolate wrappers if the ingredients used were produced by forced child labour.

In the 2022–23 growing season, Ivory Coast authorised 102 companies and cooperatives to export cocoa and coffee, including 52 export companies, 41 cooperatives, and nine grinding companies. This authorisation was granted by the Coffee and Cocoa Board, the industry regulator.

== Pests ==
- Cacao swollen shoot virus
- Phytophthora megakarya
