= Ghana Cocoa Board =

State marketing and regulatory board

- Official logo

Agency overview
- Formed: 1947
- Type: Marketing board
- Jurisdiction: Government of Ghana
- Headquarters: Accra, Ghana
- Agency executive: Randy Annertey Abbey, Chief Executive Officer
- Parent agency: Ministry of Finance and Economic Planning (Ghana)
- Website: cocobod.gh

The Ghana Cocoa Board (COCOBOD) is a Ghanaian government-controlled monopsony institution that fixes the buying price for cocoa in Ghana. Farmers are protected from the volatile prices on the world market through the price-fixing. The board also sells high-quality hybrid seeds and carries out some research on cocoa plant-related diseases.

The institution, originally established in the colonial era, was known as the Cocoa Marketing Board between 1947 and 1979. 60% of Ghana's cocoa beans are sent to the UK. The board's sole responsibility is to support production, marketing and processing of cocoa in the country.

== History ==
=== Origin ===
In 1937, farmers in Gold Coast, a colony of the British Empire equal to contemporary Ghana, refused to continue selling cocoa at the low prices set by European merchants and decided to withhold cocoa from the market. The strike went on for 8 months, until the British government acted by setting up the Nowell Commission of Enquiry to investigate the issue. The Nowell Commission report advised the government to assist cocoa farmers by establishing a Marketing Board.

=== West African Produce Control Board (1940–1946) ===
In 1940, the government established the West African Produce Control Board to purchase cocoa under guaranteed prices from all West African countries. It operated throughout World War II and was dissolved in 1946.

=== Cocoa Marketing Board (1947–1979) ===
The first attempt to regulate market value and production was in 1947 through the Ghana Marketing Board. The Ghana Marketing Board was established by ordinance in 1947 with the sum of 27 million Ghanaian Cedi as its initial working capital. In 1979, this board was dissolved and reconstituted as the Ghana Cocoa Board.

=== Ghana Cocoa Board (1979–) ===
In 1984, the COCOBOD underwent institutional reform aimed at subjecting the cocoa sector to market forces. COCOBOD's role was reduced, and 40 percent of its staff, or at least 35,000 employees, were dismissed. Furthermore, the government shifted responsibility for crop transport to the private sector. Subsidies for production inputs (fertilizers, insecticides, fungicides, and equipment) were removed, and there was a measure of privatization of the processing sector through at least one joint venture. In addition, a new payment system known as the Akuafo Check System was introduced in 1982 at the point of purchase of dried beans.

Ghana's Government implemented a strategic plan in 1984 putting the sale of agriculture, particularly Cocoa, in the hands of the Government. With the regulation of pricing and manufacturing controlled by the government over 30,000+ jobs were lost but Ghana still holds its spot as one of three highest yielding countries of Cocoa.

In 2018, Ghana and Côte d’Ivoire, the two largest producers of cocoa, founded the Côte d'Ivoire–Ghana Cocoa Initiative, to increase cocoa prices, often described as OPEC for cocoa and thus dubbed "COPEC".

In May 2024, Reuters reported that COCOBOD would borrow up to $1.5 billion by September to finance 2024/25 cocoa purchases and compensate for low output. An earlier agreed $800 million loan faced delays due to low cocoa output.

== Governance ==
The Ghana Cocoa Board operates under the legal framework established by the Ghana Cocoa Board Act, 1984 (PNDC Law 81). In June 2024, the board announced a partnership with the law firm Shawbell Consulting to review existing legislation governing the cocoa industry, including the 1984 Act

== Controversies and recent developments ==
=== Financial and sector strain (2025–2026) ===
Since 2025, Ghana's cocoa production figures for the 2024/2025 crop season were below targets, prompting concerns about output and sector stability. Outstanding debt levels within COCOBOD reached into the billions of Ghanaian cedis, leading to a government review of the board's balance sheet and operational model. The board also faced criticism over delayed payments to farmers, with some growers reporting they had not received payment for beans sold since late 2025.

=== Salary reductions and cost-cutting measures ===
In February 2026, COCOBOD announced salary reductions for executive management (20%) and senior staff (10%) as part of broader cost-containment measures. These cuts were intended to align expenditure with available revenue for the 2025/26 crop year.

=== Producer price reductions and political backlash ===
In early 2026, the government and COCOBOD implemented a reduction in the guaranteed farmgate price for cocoa, cutting it by more than one thousand Ghanaian cedis per 64-kilogram bag. The price adjustment was part of reforms announced by the Finance Minister, Cassiel Ato Forson to stabilise the cocoa sector through pricing, financial restructuring, and governance changes.

=== Legal and transparency ===
In February 2026, a Ghanaian citizen filed a formal Right to Information (RTI) request compelling COCOBOD to disclose internal decisions, financial data, and procurement records behind recent salary reductions and price setting. The complaint cited Ghana's 1992 Constitution and the Right to Information Act.

=== Local fertiliser procurement policy ===
In September 2019, the Government of Ghana directed the Ghana Cocoa Board (COCOBOD) to source all fertilisers intended for cocoa farmers from local manufacturers beginning in 2020. The directive was announced by former vice-president Dr Mahamudu Bawumia,

== Heads of COCOBOD ==
The following is a list of the heads of the Ghana Cocoa Board and its predecessor institution since its establishment in 1947.

Name	Title	Term start	Term end	Notes
A. C. Mills	General Manager	1 October 1947	December 1948	
A. E. Hampson	General Manager	1 October 1949	25 May 1955	
J. A. E. Morley	Managing Director	6 March 1953	March 1956	
Harry Dodoo	General Manager	25 March 1955	28 February 1965	First Ghanaian head
Harry Dodoo	Managing Director	1 May 1965	22 February 1967	
Frederick Robert Kankam-Boadu	Acting Managing Director	23 February 1967	14 May 1968	
Frederick Robert Kankam-Boadu	Managing Director	14 May 1968	1 October 1968	
Uriah Kwesi Hackman	Managing Director	1 November 1968	9 October 1969	
J. G. Amoafo	Managing Director	21 May 1970	27 January 1972	
Uriah Kwesi Hackman	Executive Chairman	28 January 1972	31 August 1973	
Lt. Col. Kwaku A. Takyi	Executive Chairman	20 December 1973	19 February 1975	
Cdr. J. C. Addo	Managing Director	20 February 1975	31 July 1978	
Andrews Kwame Pianim	Chief Executive	1 August 1978	4 October 1979	
Mumuni Bawumia	Interim Chairman	5 October 1979	30 September 1981	
Mumuni Bawumia	Chief Executive	1 October 1981	10 January 1982	
Kwame Gyamfi	Chief Executive	11 January 1982	25 August 1983	
Harry Dodoo	Chief Executive	7 October 1983	17 September 1986	
K. N. Owusu	Chief Executive	17 September 1986	28 December 1989	
David Aninakwa	Chief Executive	28 December 1989	16 January 1996	
Flt. Lt. Joseph Atiemo	Chief Executive	4 September 1993	3 September 1996	
John Henry Newman	Chief Executive	3 September 1996	2001	
S. K. Appah	Acting Chief Executive	2001	2001	
Isaac Osei	Chief Executive	April 2006	December 2008	
Anthony Fofie	Chief Executive	16 December 2008	30 November 2013	
Stephen Kwabena Opuni	Chief Executive	30 November 2013	13 January 2017	
Joseph Boahen Aidoo	Chief Executive	13 January 2017	13 January 2025	
Randy Abbey	Chief Executive	24 January 2025	Incumbent	

== Subsidiaries ==
- Cocoa Research Institute of Ghana
- Seed Production Division
- Cocoa Health and Extension Division
- Quality Control Company
- Cocoa Marketing Company

== See also ==
- Cocoa production in Ghana
- Agriculture in Ghana
- Canada Wheat Board, a similar monopoly board that existed in Canada
- Côte d'Ivoire–Ghana Cocoa Initiative
