= Regenerative cocoa =

Cacao produced with regenerative agriculture

Regenerative cocoa is cocoa (also known as cacao) produced on a farm that employs regenerative agriculture and agroforestry methods. It is most closely associated with the Ecuadorian chocolate company To'ak, the organic food supplier Navitas, the rainforest conservation organization Third Millennium Alliance (TMA), and the social-agricultural enterprise Terra Genesis. Cocoa is the raw material that is used to produce chocolate.

Regenerative cocoa is characterized by biodiverse agroforestry plantations in which cocoa trees are grown in the shade of other trees, mimicking a natural forest ecosystem. This form of cultivation is used as a method to restore the forest canopy on abandoned cattle pasture and other areas of deforested agricultural land. It is generally regarded as a "win-win" strategy of sustainable land management, in which farmers can generate food and revenue while regenerating the forest.

The regenerative cocoa movement is a reaction against monoculture cocoa plantations, which are often a cause of deforestation in the tropics.

== Agroforestry ==
The eco-friendliness of cocoa farming entirely depends on where and how the cocoa trees are planted. When planted in a monoculture, cocoa farming can be ecologically destructive. When planted in an agroforestry setting, it can be regenerative. This principle is the basis for regenerative cocoa.

Agroforestry has long been touted as an ecologically sustainable method of agricultural production. It is best described as an agricultural method that grows crops in the form of a forest. For example, incorporating fruit trees, timber trees, and nitrogen-fixing trees that improve soil fertility—all in the same parcel of land.

Regenerative agroforestry uses this principle as a mechanism for forest restoration. One of the benefits of this approach is a net removal of CO_{2} from the atmosphere. Other benefits include enhanced yields from staple food crops, enhanced farmer livelihoods from income generation, increased biodiversity, improved soil structure and health, and reduced erosion. With improved soil structure, crops produced via regenerative farming contain higher levels of certain vitamins, minerals, and phytochemicals. More phytochemicals can enhance the flavor of foods compared to conventional agricultural practices. In general terms, regenerative agroforestry is a form of regenerative agriculture that employs mostly trees rather than annual crops.

Cocoa trees, which are native to the rainforests of Ecuador, are naturally adapted to survive and thrive in the understory of the tropical forest. This, combined with the ever-increasing global demand for chocolate, makes cocoa trees an ideal component of agroforestry plantations in the tropics.

The government of Brazil defines a cabruca as a cacao farm that has at least 40 trees native to the Atlantic Forest biome per hectare. About 60 percent of the cocoa grown in its most productive state, Bahia, is grown on cabruca farms.

== Climate change mitigation ==
Regenerative cocoa is also reported to have climate change mitigation benefits. Cocoa-based agroforestry was measured to sequester 4.7 to 9.3 tons of CO_{2} per hectare per year in Central America and up to 17.9 tons of CO_{2} per hectare per year in Ecuador.

== Regenerative cocoa in practice ==
The luxury Ecuadorian chocolate company To'ak and the rainforest conservation organization TMA (Third Millennium Alliance) jointly manage a regenerative cocoa project in coastal Ecuador, specifically with the agricultural communities that surround the Jama-Coaque Ecological Reserve. The program was designed as a strategy to reverse the trend of deforestation of the Pacific Equatorial Forest (also known as the Pacific Forest of Ecuador).

TMA provides local farmers with start-up capital, seedlings, irrigation equipment, and financial incentives to convert deforested land into regenerative forests. The program is financed by carbon offset revenue, which provides bridge income to the farmers for the first five years, before the cocoa trees reach productive age. Once the cocoa trees start to produce cocoa pods, To'ak offers to purchase the cocoa at premium prices—at least 3x higher than local market prices.

Jerry Toth, one of TMA's co-founders, says, "As many cocoa farmers will readily admit, planting cocoa trees is the easy part. The hard part is finding a buyer willing to pay fair prices. This is where To'ak's role becomes indispensable." To'ak, which is known for selling the most expensive chocolate in the world, pays cocoa growers the highest prices in the world—200% to 800% above Fair Trade prices, depending on the Cru.

Ancient Nacional cocoa is believed to be cultivated in only three appellations in the world: in the Jama-Coaque mountains and the valley of Piedra de Plata in Ecuador, and in Marañón Canyon in Peru.

Navitas, a California-based company that sells organic cocoa powder, sources regenerative cocoa from the Liloma Cocoa Cooperative in Sierra Leone, which is Regenerative Organic Certified. "Regenerative farming is a holistic way of growing food that closely mimics nature's design, and goes beyond simply sustaining our natural resources, to replenishing or regenerating them," says Zach Adelman, co-founder and CEO of Navitas Organics.

Terra Genesis's regenerative cocoa project is also based in coastal Ecuador and extends into coastal Colombia.

== As a response to deforestation ==
The World Cocoa Foundation reported that deforestation is a major issue in many cocoa-growing regions, particularly in West Africa, where Côte d'Ivoire and Ghana collectively produce nearly two-thirds of the world's supply of cocoa. Research published by Mighty Earth revealed that, in the period between January 2019 and January 2022 alone, 58,918 hectares of forest was replaced with cocoa plantations in Côte d'Ivoire and Ghana combined. Confectionary News reports that in Indonesia, 687,000 hectares (1.7 million acres) were cleared for cocoa between 1988 and 2007.

Etelle Higonnet, Mighty Earth's legal and campaign director, says that one solution is for the chocolate industry to switch to agroforestry and shade-grown cocoa, and that cocoa traceability mechanisms need to be greatly improved.
