= Cocoa production in Samoa =

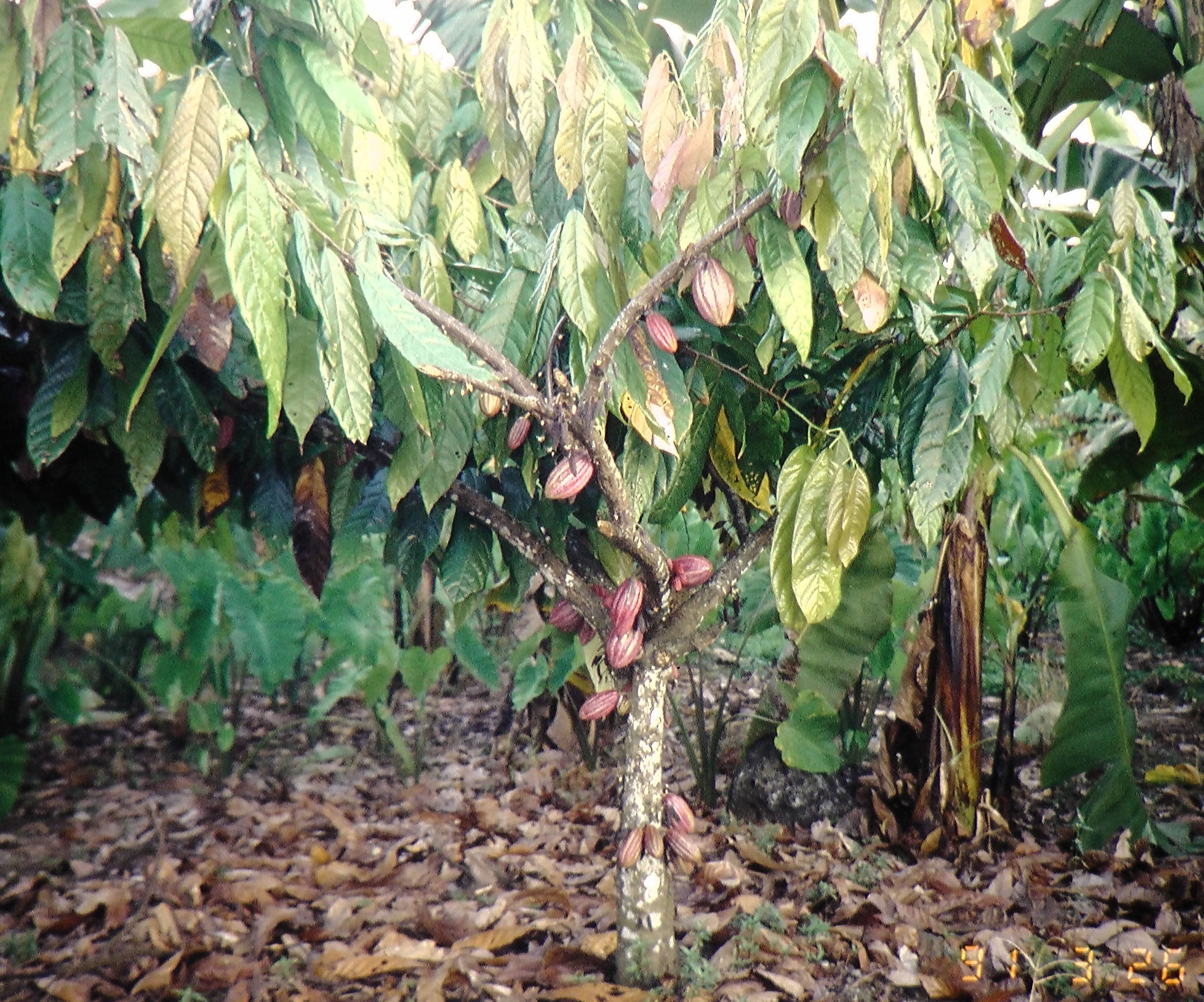
Cocoa tree (Theobroma cacao) in Apia, Samoa

Cocoa production in Samoa began when German colonists introduced the cocoa tree (Theobroma cacao) to Samoa in 1883, and cocoa cultivation became widespread on the islands by the end of the century. A hybrid variety of cocoa known as Samoan Trinitario (or koko Samoa) emerged, praised by contemporary buyers for its fine flavor. Colonial authorities initially brought indentured workers from the Pacific Islands and later China to grow the labor-intensive crop. Investigations by Chinese authorities into labor conditions on Samoan plantations led to an official complaint by the Chinese consul and the departure of hundreds of Chinese workers, although thousands of others remained. Cocoa production peaked in the 1960s but began dropping in the 1970s due to falling cocoa prices and a decline in cocoa quality and quantity caused by the spread of pests and plant diseases. Cyclone Ofa's arrival in Samoa in 1990 caused significant environmental damage and a drought that, alongside low global cocoa prices, destroyed Samoa's cocoa industry. Cocoa exports from Samoa have been steadily rising since revival attempts that started in 2012. The Food and Agriculture Organization of the United Nations estimated that total cocoa production in Samoa was 483 tons in 2024.

Cocoa is grown on plantations in the northwest coastal regions of Savaiʻi and Upolu, Samoa's two main islands. The islands' tropical climate and nitrogen-rich soil create an ideal environment for the cultivation of cocoa, which is done almost exclusively by subsistence farmers. In contrast to other cocoa-producing countries in Oceania that export their crop, most of the cocoa produced in Samoa is consumed domestically, particularly as a drink also named koko Samoa. Koko Samoa is typically prepared by women from the families of cocoa growers, and it is a popular product both locally and regionally, especially in New Zealand, Australia, and American Samoa.

== History ==
=== German colonial period ===
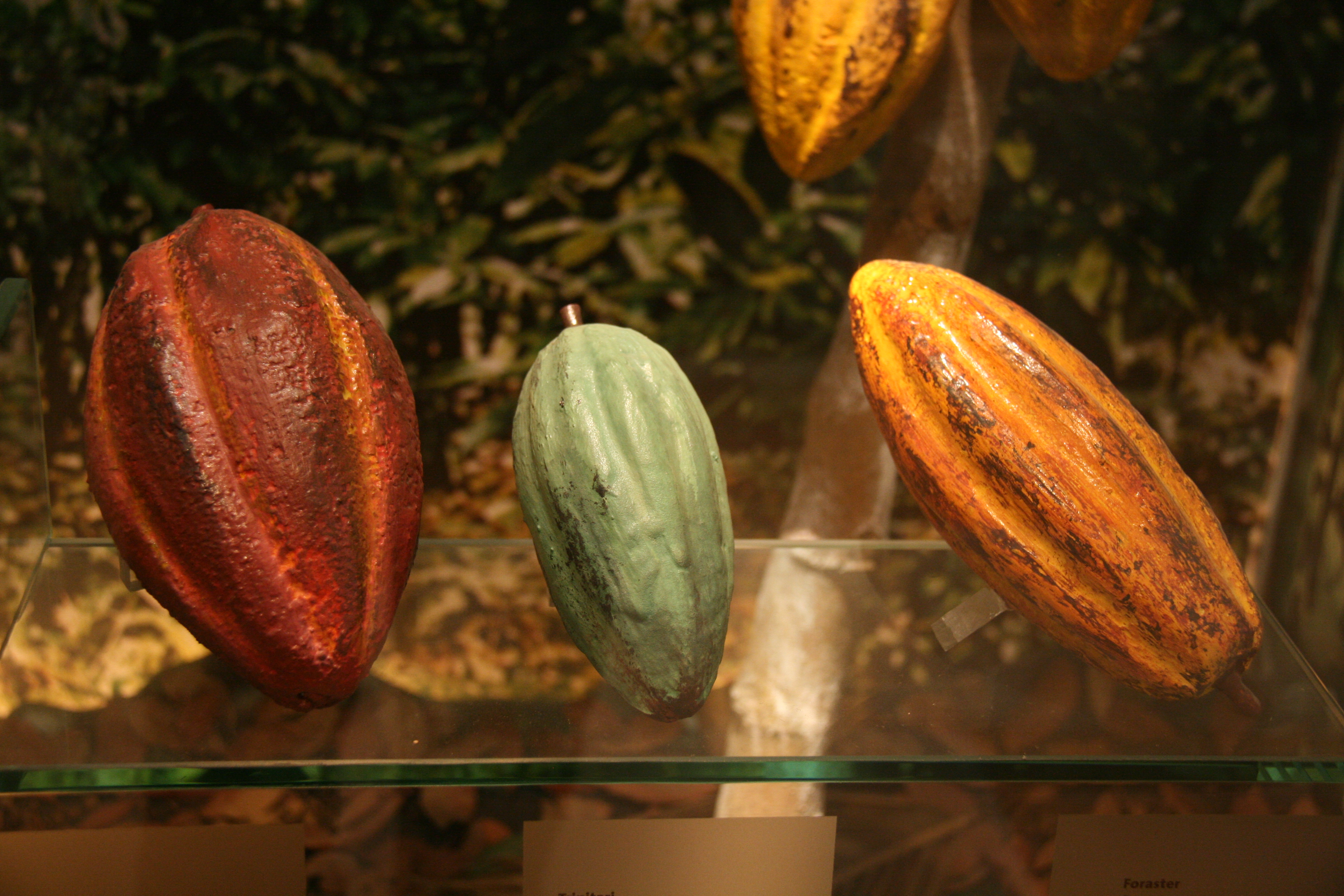
Forastero, Trinitario, and Criollo cocoa pods

Cocoa was introduced to Samoa in 1883, when German colonists brought the Criollo variant from British Ceylon (present-day Sri Lanka). The Germans intended to grow cocoa mainly as an export crop. Cocoa cultivation began in earnest in 1892, through the efforts of American merchant and planter Harry Jay Moors. Hoping to enrich the island amid the cocoa boom of the 1890s, Moors advertised and distributed detailed guides on how to grow the cocoa tree and sold 250,000 seeds at cost between 1895 and 1896. Mataʻafa Iosefo, the paramount chief of Samoa, had about 700 cocoa trees by 1898. That same year, Forastero plants (specifically of the Amelonado type) were introduced from Java and planted alongside surviving Criollo plants. The resulting hybrid of the two is known as Samoan Trinitario or koko Samoa. German and American companies praised the fine quality of Samoan cocoa. The Ghirardelli Chocolate Company in San Francisco, for example, remarked that Samoan cocoa was "superior in flavor and strength to that of Ceylon".

Cocoa was popular among foreign planters in Samoa because it was well-suited for mixed plantations. Banana, papaya, and rubber trees provided shade for young cocoa trees, while pumpkins were grown to shade the ground. During the Samoan "cocoa rush" of 1898, the Samoa Weekly Herald predicted that cocoa would become the islands' main export. For the first decade of cocoa cultivation, most of the people working on cocoa plantations were indigenous Samoans. The colonial authorities restricted the import of labor but gave the German Trade and Plantations Society for the South Sea Islands (DHPG) sole permission to recruit indentured laborers from German New Guinea, the Gilbert Islands (now part of Kiribati), and the New Hebrides (present-day Vanuatu). Seasonal workers also arrived from Niue.

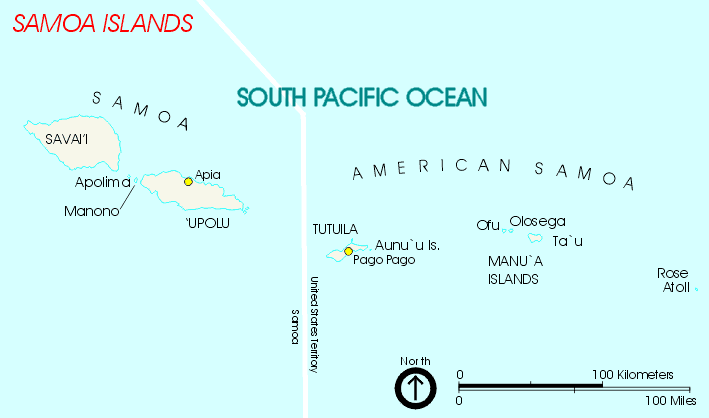
Map of the Samoan Islands with present-day political boundaries. German Samoa eventually became the Independent State of Samoa.

The Second Samoan Civil War resulted in the partition of the Samoan Islands between Germany and the United States, and the exit of the British, who had previously opposed the import of Chinese labor. In 1903, Wilhelm Solf, the governor of German Samoa, approved the first wave of indentured workers from China, arranged and promoted by the Prussian planter Richard Deeken. By 1914, a total of 3,868 Chinese workers had been recruited. The German colonial administration encouraged foreign planters, including remaining Britons, to hire Chinese workers.

The Chinese workers, as well as their Pacific Islander colleagues, complained of physical abuse and arbitrary wage cuts, particularly on Deeken's plantations. A worker named Cheng Wing sent a letter to his uncle in British Hong Kong, who publicly displayed a poster on his behalf alleging Chinese workers in Samoa had been hit, kicked, and caned, with ten men dying from their abuse. In 1908, the Chinese government sent two officials, Lin Shu Fen and then Lin Jun Chao, to investigate labor conditions on plantations employing Chinese workers. Lin Shu Fen's report confirmed the most extreme abuses. Lin Jun Chao meanwhile wrote to the then acting governor Erich Schultz-Ewerth, recommending, among other things, an end to private floggings and the requirement that Chinese workers wear a brass identification badge (the former was accepted by Schultz-Ewerth). Deeken was never punished for his treatment of his workers, but hundreds of Chinese did consequently leave Samoa, and Deeken's cocoa plantations suffered a net loss by 1913 in comparison to DHPG's, which employed New Guineans. By the end of German rule over Samoa in 1914, the islands had 2,184 Chinese and 877 Melanesian indentured workers.

=== New Zealand period ===
German Samoa was occupied by New Zealand from 1914 to 1920 as a consequence of World War I. The New Zealanders were initially hesitant to use Chinese indentured labor on cocoa plantations, but they were swayed by the rising price of cocoa during the war, which jumped to £130 per ton from a range of £37 to £60 before. Cocoa production in Samoa peaked in 1917 at 1,266 tons.

In 1924, the then administrator of the Western Samoa mandate George Spafford Richardson announced that Chinese laborers would officially be "free" and no longer indentured. However, nothing changed as the workers' new contracts still tied them to the plantations and prevented them from owning land. Nonetheless, the de jure change was done in the spirit of the League of Nations' postwar ambitions, to appease the Chinese Republican government, and to soften relations between China and the United Kingdom, amid labor disputes in Hong Kong and Guangdong. The recruitment of Chinese workers to Samoa was banned in 1934, and the New Zealand Labor government began repatriating dozens of Chinese in 1936, despite the protests of plantation owners. In 1950, the High Commissioner for Samoa reported that the 171 Chinese workers who had remained on Samoa's cocoa plantations would become free residents.

=== Post-independence period ===
Commercial cocoa production in Samoa peaked in the 1960s, when cocoa was the country's second-largest export earner. Cocoa exports began declining in the 1970s due to a combination of falling cocoa prices, inadequate planting materials, smaller and lower-quality yields, infestations by cocoa pod borers (Conopomorpha cramerella), and the spread of black pod disease (Phytophthora palmivora). The Samoan government attempted to revitalize the cocoa industry in 1983 by launching a program to plant new Amelonado trees that were higher-yielding and more resistant to diseases, but which produced less flavorful cocoa in comparison to Samoan Trinitario trees. In 1990, Cyclone Ofa made landfall in Samoa, causing widespread environmental damage. The drought that followed, coupled with low cocoa prices on the global market, decimated the Samoan cocoa industry between 1990 and 2000.

The cocoa industry has seen a revival since 2012, with exports of cocoa consistently increasing every year since. The 2019 Samoa Agriculture Census listed cocoa as a top-five crop of the country, with over 15,923 agricultural households growing it, representing a 19 percent increase over the previous decade.

== Production and consumption ==
Samoa has a tropical climate and environment suitable for cocoa cultivation, with heavy rainfall and volcanic soil rich in nitrogen. Cocoa plantations cover approximately 1,966.3 hectares (4,859 acres) of agricultural land in Samoa, with each cocoa grower dedicating an average of 0.06 hectares (0.15 acres) to the crop. The plantations are located in the northwest coastal regions of Samoa's two main islands, Savaiʻi and Upolu. According to the Food and Agriculture Organization of the United Nations, Samoa produced 483 tons of cocoa in 2024, ranking 39th out of 57 countries that year. The largest cocoa exporter in Samoa is Vaʻai Plantation Organics.

While cocoa is primarily an export crop elsewhere in Oceania, most Samoan cocoa is consumed locally as a drink named koko Samoa. Koko Samoa is a chocolate drink made from a type of cocoa mass, also called koko Samoa, which consists of ground fermented or unfermented cocoa beans. The mass is typically prepared by women and is in year-round demand in both local and export markets, particularly in New Zealand, Australia, and American Samoa. The drink is also sold at local markets by cocoa growers and their families, nearly all of whom (97% as of 2025) are subsistence farmers. In 2017, a cocoa shortage in Samoa tripled the price of koko Samoa (compared to 2015 prices).
