= To'ak Chocolate =

Ecuadorian chocolate company

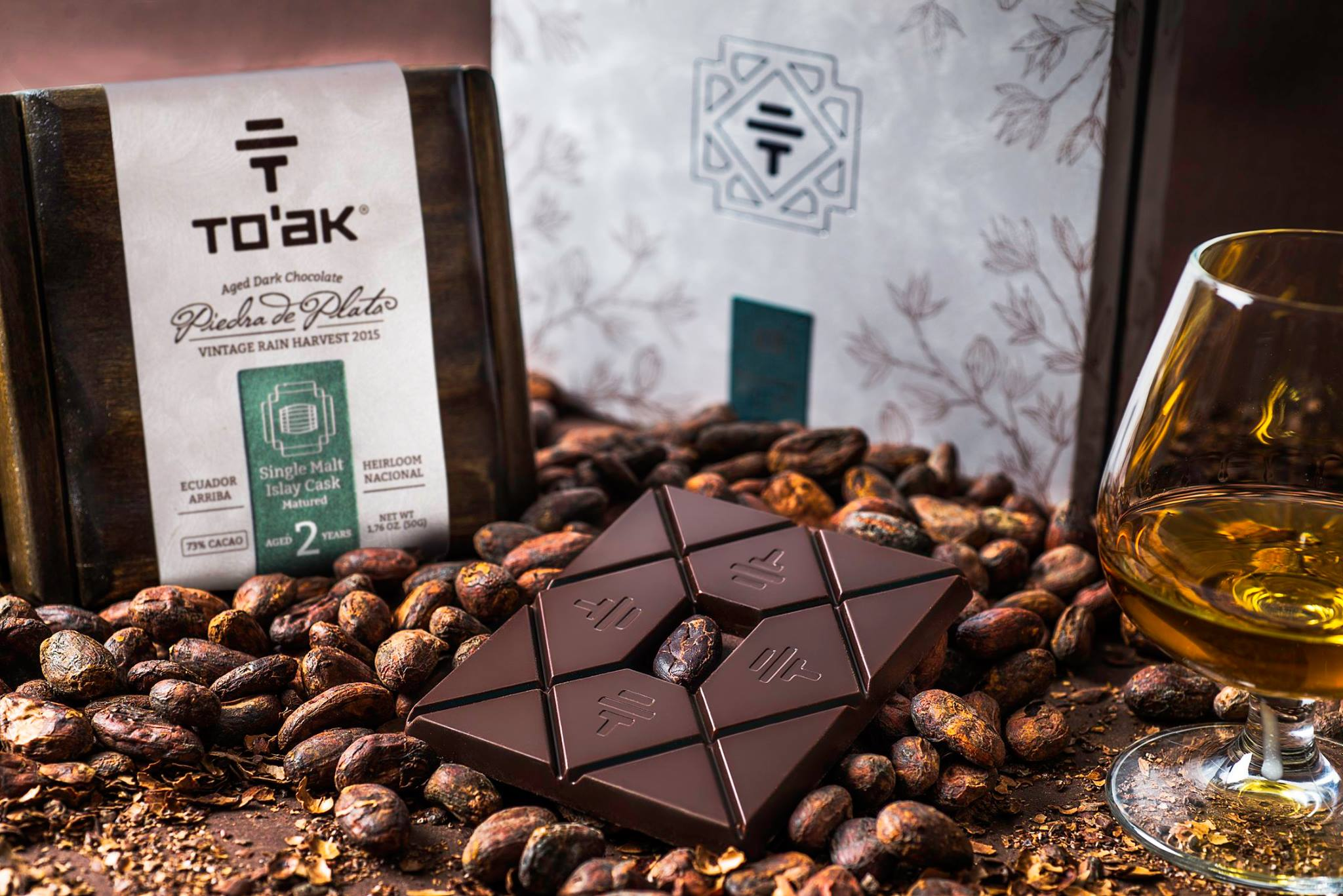
To'ak Chocolate's Islay Whisky Cask Aged bar

To'ak Chocolate (/toʊɑːk/) is an Ecuadorian chocolate company founded in 2013 by Jerry Toth, Carl Schweizer, and Denise Valencia. It produces its chocolate from the rare Nacional cocoa bean variety. To'ak Chocolate's Heirloom Nacional cacao bar has been dubbed "the world's most expensive chocolate bar" by CNBC in 2017.

== Chocolate bars ==
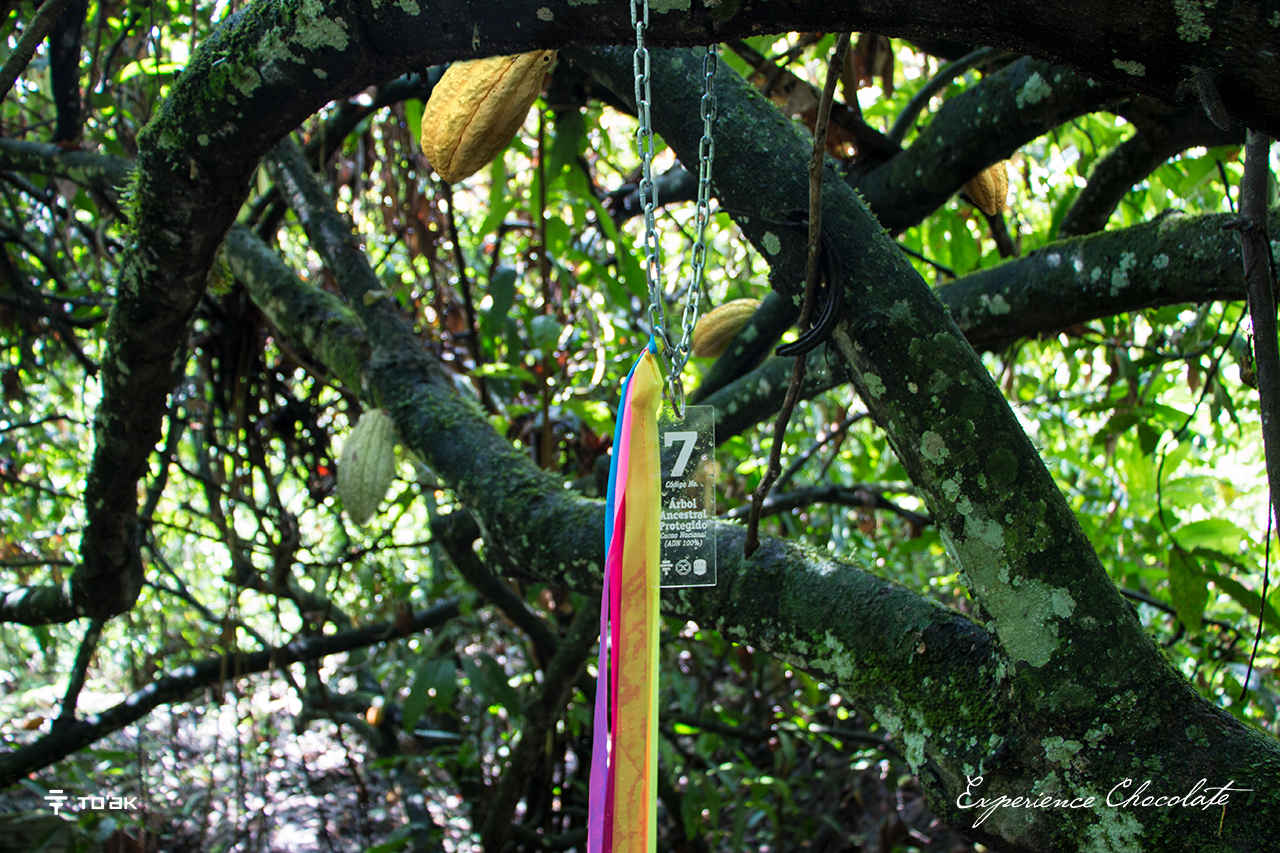
DNA verified Heirloom Nacional cacao tree

To’ak's chocolate bars are produced from the Nacional variety of cocoa bean, which was thought to be extinct by some experts.

The chocolate bar is handcrafted, and its production involves fermenting the cocoa beans. The chocolate bar is composed entirely of the Nacional cocoa bean, with a small amount of added cane sugar. A single roasted cacao bean is placed in the middle of the bar to signify the bar's origin. The company ages bars in wood casks and empty spirit casks.

== Regenerative cacao ==
To’ak and the rainforest conservation organization TMA (Third Millennium Alliance) jointly manage a regenerative cacao project in coastal Ecuador, specifically with the agricultural communities that surround the Jama-Coaque Ecological Reserve. The program was designed as a strategy to reverse the trend of deforestation of the Pacific Equatorial Forest (also known as the Pacific Forest of Ecuador).

TMA provides local farmers with start-up capital, seedlings, irrigation equipment, and financial incentives to convert deforested land into regenerative forests. The program is financed by carbon offset revenue, which provides bridge income to the farmers for the first five years, before the cacao trees reach productive age. Once the cacao trees start to produce cacao pods, To’ak offers to purchase the cacao at premium prices.
