= Koko Samoa =

Samoan hot chocolate drink

Koko Samoa is a traditional Samoan hot chocolate drink made from ground cocoa beans. Most cocoa produced in Samoa is consumed domestically as koko Samoa, which is sold at local markets by cocoa farmers and their families. Koko Samoa may also refer to a dry cocoa mass made from coarsely ground cocoa beans, or a mixed subspecies of cocoa known more commonly as Samoan Trinitario.

== Background ==
The cocoa tree (Theobroma cacao) is not native to Samoa but was introduced to the islands in 1883 by German colonists who brought plants of the Criollo subspecies from British Ceylon (present-day Sri Lanka). Although the Germans intended for the cocoa to be grown mainly as an export crop, Samoans adopted it into their culture soon thereafter, and cocoa presently sees large domestic consumption in Samoa, unlike elsewhere in Oceania.

== Preparation ==
Most cocoa produced in Samoa is consumed locally as koko Samoa. It is typically prepared by women. Koko Samoa is made first by harvesting ripe cocoa pods from a cocoa tree, and separating the seeds (i.e. cocoa beans) from the surrounding pulp. The beans are then fermented, sun-dried, and roasted over a hot metal plate heated by an open fire. After roasting, the husks are removed from the beans, which are subsequently ground into a coarse liquid paste in a wooden mortar. The paste is then mixed with boiling water in a kettle and sweetened to make the drink.

== Consumption and other uses ==
Cocoa farmers and their families typically make and sell the koko Samoa drink at local markets. Grounded cocoa beans are often turned into a shelf-stable cocoa mass also called koko Samoa, which can be stored and turned into the drink at a later time. The mass is in year-round demand locally, and is also exported in significant amounts to New Zealand, Australia, and American Samoa. In preparing the drink, cooks scrape or grate cocoa off the block, allowing it to boil for 15 minutes. The drink is then combined with sugar and sometimes milk, quickly consumed before it can cool, as fat separates and rises to the top. The chocolate grounds left in koko Samoa are either eaten or strained out through the drinker's teeth.

Koko Samoa is also an alternative name for Samoan Trinitario, a hybrid of Criollo and Forastero cocoa plants brought from Sri Lanka and Java, respectively.
