= Bulk cocoa =

Class of cocoa beans

Bulk cocoa is a class of cocoa beans. It is contrasted with flavor cocoa. They generally grow in West Africa.

== History ==
As the market share of bulk cocoa increased, the range of cocoa bean varieties produced shrank, leading to a reduction in agrobiodiversity.

== Description ==
Bulk cocoa generally comes from Forastero-type cacao trees. Bulk cocoa is distinguished from flavor cocoa using the subjective definition of containing undesirable or poor flavor, drying or fermentation. Bulk cocoas have a strong inherent flavor. They are regulated by quality requirements, which allow manufacturers to ensure homogeneity for what they add to blends, maintaining brand flavors.

Over 95% of the world's cocoa production was classified as bulk as of 2017.

== Producers ==
Most bulk cocoa is produced in West Africa.

Ghana produces the highest quality bulk beans, as Cadbury has maintained its reputation based on using beans from Ghana. One reason may be that Ghana has retained a high degree of structural control over its cocoa industry. Cocoa in Ghana is cultivated for a consistent flavor, which is understood in European and American markets as the flavor of chocolate. This has been supported by the Ghana Cocoa Board.

Indonesia produces bulk cocoa of variable quality. Most Indonesian cocoa is unfermented, and is used as bulk filler.

== Markets ==
Bulk beans are traded as a commodity, where distinctions are made between bulk grades in futures trading.

== See also ==
- Cocoa production in Ghana
- Cocoa production in Ivory Coast
- Types of cocoa beans

== Sources ==
=== Books ===
- Fowler, Mark S; Coutel, Fabien (2017). "Cocoa beans: from tree to factory". In Beckett, Stephen T; Fowler, Mark S; Ziegler, Gregory R (eds.). Beckett’s Industrial Chocolate Manufacture and Use (5th ed.). West Sussex, UK: Wiley. ISBN 9781118780145.
- Leissle, Kristy (2018). Cocoa. Polity. ISBN 9781509513208. OCLC 988580966.
- Ziegleder, Gottfried (2017). "Flavour development in cocoa and chocolate". In Beckett, Stephen T; Fowler, Mark S; Ziegler, Gregory R (eds.). Beckett’s Industrial Chocolate Manufacture and Use (5th ed.). West Sussex, UK: Wiley. ISBN 9781118780145.

=== Journal articles ===
- Martin, Carla D; Sampeck, Kathryn E (2015). "The bitter and sweet of chocolate in Europe". Socio.hu Social Science Review. 5 (SI3): 37–60. doi:10.18030/socio.hu.2015en.37. eISSN 2063-0468.
