= Nacional (cocoa bean) =

Variety of cocoa bean

The Nacional, also known as fine aroma cacao and referred in Spanish as fino de aroma. It is a rare variety of cocoa bean native to the regions of South America, including Ecuador and Peru. The Ecuadorian Nacional cacao traces its genetic lineage back as far as 5,500 years.

== History ==
The Ecuadorian Nacional cocoa traces its genetic lineage as far back as 5,500 years, to the earliest-known cacao trees domesticated by humanity.

During the 18th and 19th centuries, Nacional cacao was regarded by many European chocolatiers as the most coveted source of cacao in the world, prized for its distinctive floral aroma and complex flavor profile. This period marked the golden era of Ecuadorian cacao. However, this prosperity came to an abrupt end in 1916, when an outbreak of witches’ broom disease devastated Nacional cacao throughout the country.

Following the disease outbreak, germplasm from foreign cacao varieties was introduced beginning in the 1930s, leading to widespread hybridization of Ecuadorian cacao. By the early of the 21st century, most experts believed that the pure Nacional genotype no longer existed.

Today, pure National genotypes are extremely rare, as most remaining varieties have been interbred with other cocoa types.

In 2009, Ecuador's agricultural research institute, the Instituto Nacional de Investigaciones Agropecuarias (INIAP), collected DNA samples from cacao trees throughout Ecuador. Of the 11,000 samples tested, only six trees were confirmed to be 100% genetically pure Nacional cacao, representing just 0.05% of the trees analyzed.

In 2013, groves of 100–120 year old cocoa trees were discovered by To'ak Chocolate in the Piedra de Plata vally, located in the mountainous Arriba cacao-growing region of Manabi province, Ecuador. With support from the Heirloom Cacao Preservation fund (HCP), along with Freddy Amores (director of INIAP), and Dr. Lyndel Meinhardt of the USDA-ARS, DNA testing was conducted on a small sample of these trees. Of the sixteen mature trees tested, nine were confirmed to be genetically pure Nacional, increasing the total number of DNA-verified pure Nacional trees in Ecuador to fifteen.

== See also ==
- Types of cocoa beans
