= Flavor cocoa =

Class of cocoa beans

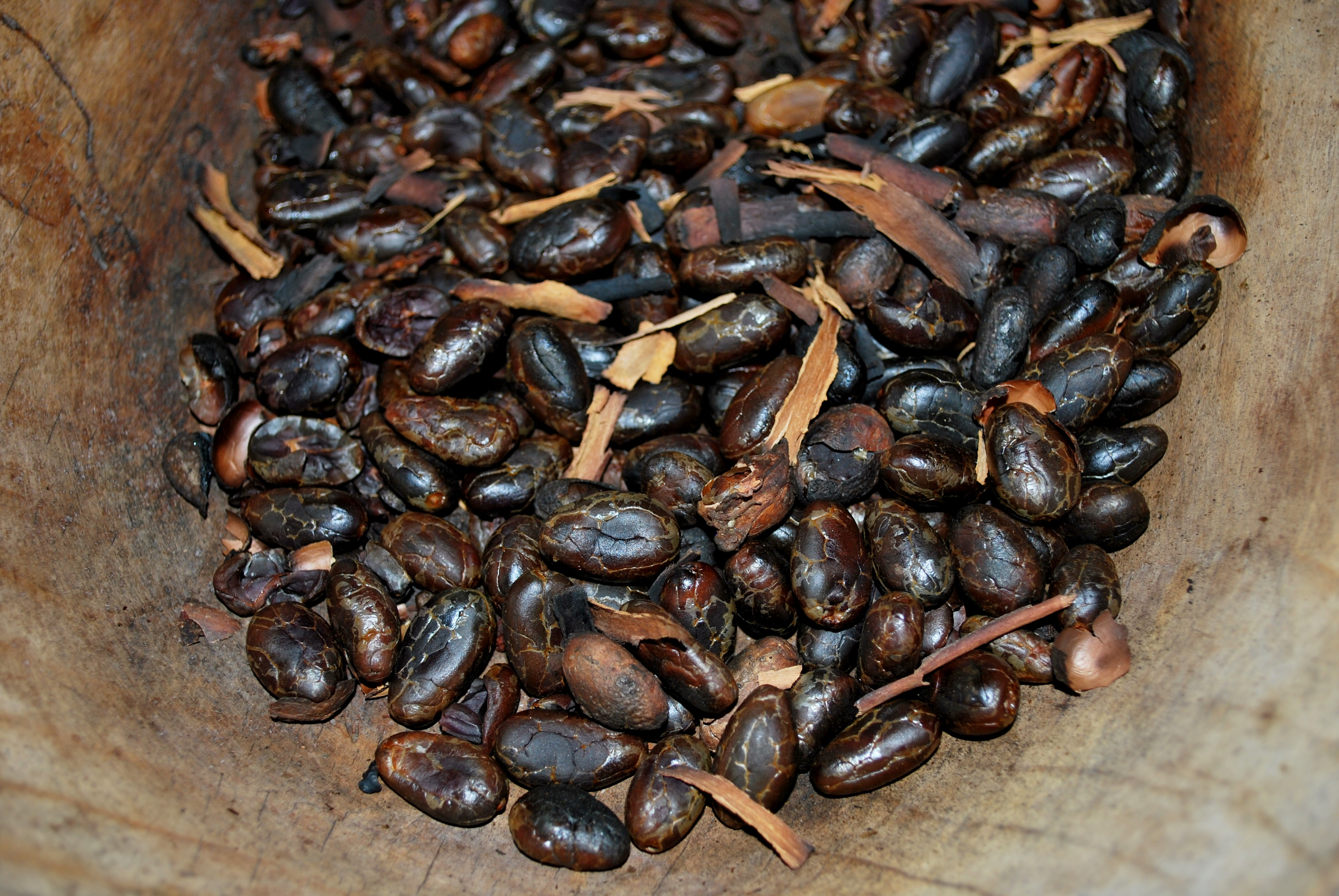
Toasted cocoa beans

Flavor cocoa or fine cocoa are cocoa beans that are sold at a premium, contrasted with bulk cocoa.

== Description ==
The beans are not traded as commodities, and may be from specific geographical regions, crops or varieties, or may be harvested or fermented using specific techniques. If a crop does not meet standards regarding drying, fermentation or the flavor is unacceptable, they are sold as bulk.

Prices for flavor cocoa generally begin at a 20% premium, rising to up to treble the price.

It was defined by the United Nations Conference on Trade and Development:

Fine flavour cocoa is cocoa characterized by a complex sensory profile, composed of well-balanced basic attributes with aromatic and flavour notes; the complementary attributes can be clearly perceived and identified in the expression of its aromas and flavours; it results from the interaction between (a) a particular genetic composition, (b) favourable growing conditions in a given environment/terroir, (c) specific plantation management techniques, (d) specific harvesting and post-harvest practices and (e) stable chemical and physical composition, and integrity of the bean.

— United Nations Conference on Trade and Development, International Cocoa Agreement, 2010 as amended, 2022, Article 2.2

Most flavor cocoa is used for high-quality dark chocolate.

== History ==
In Aztec markets, cocoa was categorized by its place of origin. This identification continued after Europeans began consuming chocolate, and in the 18th century, cocoa was advertised by its port of origin. For example, physician R. Brookes reported in 1730:

The Kernels that come to us from the Coast of Caraqua, are more oily, and less bitter, than those of the French Islands, and in France and Spain they prefer them to these latter: But in Germany, and the North they have a quite opposite Taste. Several People mix that of Caraqua with that of the Islands, half in half, and pretend by this Mixture to make Chocolate better. I believe in the bottom, the difference of Chocolates is not considerable, since they are only obliged to increase or diminish the Proportion of Sugar, according as the Bitterness of the Kernels require it.

With the mass consumption of chocolate brought about by the Industrial Revolution, the place of origin of cocoa stopped being referenced. As producers emphasized a consistent flavor to create a brand identity, the natural variety in cocoa was de-emphasized, through blending beans of different origins and types. The International Cocoa Organization has estimated that in the early 20th century, flavor beans constituted 40–50% of all beans.

== Assessment ==
Flavor beans are assessed according to various criteria, including genetic material, acidity, fermentation and drying levels, color, harm from disease and pests, mold and flavor. Assessments are objective and subjective; while a bean can be assessed as having, for example, floral tasting notes, whether this is desirable is determined by the taster.

=== 2015 ICCO Ad Hoc Panel on Fine or Flavour Cocoa ===
In 2015, the International Cocoa Organization (ICCO) recommended that all cocoa exports from Bolivia, Costa Rica, Dominica, Grenada, Madagascar, Mexico, Nicaragua and Saint Lucia be classified as flavor beans. 90–95% of cocoa exports from Colombia, Venezuela, Jamaica and Papua New Guinea were recommended to be classified as flavor. The influence of large chocolate makers and cocoa traders, such as Nestlé and Valrhona, and Olam and Daarnhouwer, and the absence of West African countries was criticized by academic Kristy Leissle. Leissle characterized the process as favoring origins that already had industry support, rather than solely using objective and subjective assessments.

== Single origin ==
Single-origin chocolate uses beans from one location, which can be as large as a country or as small as a single plantation. It often refers to a geographical feature, such as a river or a valley. This chocolate does not necessarily use cocoa beans of one type. The first contemporary single-origin chocolate was made from cocoa beans from the Chuao Valley in Venezuela. This was popularized by Italian chocolate makers Amedei Chocolate, who had gained temporary exclusive use of beans from the region. Beans from the Chuao Valley are particularly prized because of the limited crop, and because mineral deposits from the local river system give the beans a unique flavor, which is considered an example of terroir in chocolate.

Other locations prized for single-location chocolate are Madagascar, which produces Criollo beans with bright, citrus notes, and Papua New Guinea, which produces beans with complex flavor. Nacional beans from Ecuador, which contain floral notes, were gaining popularity as of 2018.

Leissle argues that variable stock availability of single-origin beans when there is conflict, for instance in Venezuela, reminds consumers of the people involved in chocolate production.

== Processing ==
In the US, chocolate makers prefer cocoa beans that have been centrally fermented, rather than at each cocoa plantation, which necessarily generates variable product.

== Market share ==
Historically, flavor beans were used by chocolatiers in Western Europe, Japan, and parts of Latin America. As of 2018, they were increasingly used in the United States. Ecuador as of 2017 was the largest exporter of fine cocoa; it constituted 75% of their cocoa exports. Flavor cocoa producers are primarily considered Central and South America and the Caribbean.

Markets for flavor cocoa as of 2017 had experienced strong growth for two decades.

As of 2017, an estimated 9% of the world crop, or around 263,000 tons of fine cocoa were produced.

== See also ==
- Types of cocoa beans

== Sources ==
- Brookes, R (1730). The Natural History of Chocolate. London, England: J. Roberts (printer).
- Folds, Niels; Neilson, Jeff (2016). "Sustaining Supplies in Smallholder-Dominated Value Chains: Corporate Governance of the Global Cocoa Sector". In Squicciarini, Mara P; Swinnen, Johan (eds.). The Economics of Chocolate. Oxford University Press. ISBN 9780191793264.
- Fowler, Mark S; Coutel, Fabien (2017). "Cocoa beans: from tree to factory". In Beckett, Stephen T; Fowler, Mark S; Ziegler, Gregory R (eds.). Beckett's Industrial Chocolate Manufacture and Use (5th ed.). West Sussex, UK: Wiley. ISBN 9781118780145.
- Gay, James F. (2009). "Chocolate Production and Uses in 17th and 18th Century North America". In Grivetti, Louis Evan; Shapiro, Howard-Yana (eds.). Chocolate: History, Culture, and Heritage. New Jersey: John Wiley & Sons, Inc. ISBN 978-0-470-41131-5.
- International Cocoa Agreement, 2010: As amended, 2022** (PDF) (Report). United Nations Conference on Trade and Development. July 8, 2022.
- Leissle, Kristy (2018). Cocoa. Polity. ISBN 9781509513208. OCLC 988580966.
