= Lin Jun Chao =

Chinese consul to Samoa from 1909 to 1920

Consul of the Great Qing to Samoa
- In office 1909–1920
- Monarch: Puyi
- Preceded by: Lin Shu Fen

Chinese name
- Traditional Chinese: 林潤釗
- Simplified Chinese: 林润钊
Transcriptions
Standard Mandarin
- Hanyu Pinyin: Lín Rùnzhāo
- Wade–Giles: Lin^{2} Jun^{4}-chao^{1}

Lin Jun Chao (Chinese: 林潤釗; pinyin: Lín Rùnzhāo) was the Chinese consul to Samoa from 1909 to 1920. He received a Western education from Queen's College, Hong Kong, and studied English law at Tianjin University. He was a Chinese (Qing) official of the fourth rank, higher than his predecessor Lin Shu Fen.

In July 1908, he was sent to Samoa, then under German colonial rule, to inspect labour conditions at cocoa and coconut plantations with Chinese workers. Commenting that the workers were "labourers, not slaves", he recommended reforms to the then acting governor Erich Schultz-Ewerth, including an end to flogging, the wearing of brass identification badges on the arms of Chinese workers, and wage deductions due to illness. In regard to Chinese workers getting sick, Lin wrote in his letter:

Nobody can expect to be always in good health. Even those who take exceptional care of their health cannot prevent sickness. Now all the labourers go to work early in the morning and only get relieved late in the evening. Their work is done under the hot sun. It is not an easy job ...

Fearing a mass departure of Chinese workers, the German colonial authorities limited floggings to law enforcement, implemented sick pay, and raised wages by 50%. Unimpressed by the lax enforcement of the flogging ban, Lin demanded that Schultz-Ewerth ensure that the new contracts between Chinese workers and German employers be upheld.

== See also ==
- Chinese people in Samoa
- Cocoa production in Samoa
