= International CoCoa Farmers Organization =

- Abbreviation: ICCFO
- Formation: 4 December 2014
- Type: non-profit
- Purpose: To be the voice of cocoa farmer and defend cocoa farmers interest worldwide. Support members to eradicate child and forced labor in their profession, and promote sustainable cocoa farming and safeguard nature.
- Location: Lelystad
- Headsecretariat: Netherland
- Co-founder/Executive General: Warren Sako
- Website: http://iccfo.org/ (archived)

The International CoCoa Farmers Organization (ICCFO) is an organization that was formed in the Netherlands in 2014 in response to cocoa bean farmers needing an international platform for discussing issues in the industry. The ICCFO aims to make sure cocoa is sourced using sustainable methods and to improve the conditions of cocoa farmers and farm workers. The ICCFO consists of regional organisations in different countries representing around 600,000 cocoa workers in total. The governing board of the ICCFO consists of 13 members, each representing a cocoa-producing country. The members and structure of the board were announced in a meeting held in The Hague in February 2015.

== History ==
Cocoa farmers ensure that the entire cocoa industry is supplied with the raw material (cocoa beans). The chocolate confectionery market generate annually about $80 Billion worldwide. Cocoa farmers play a crucial role as producers and maintenance of cocoa production. Unfortunately, cocoa farmers are underrepresented in the international round table discussions on issues concerning their profession because they were unable to represent themselves as a single voice.

In June 2014 during the World Cocoa Conference, that took place in Amsterdam, cocoa farmers from eleven producing countries met at the side line of this conference and agreed to establish an international cocoa farmers organization. In December 2014 an independent and transparent cocoa farmers organization with the name International Cocoa Farmers Organization (ICCFO) was established in the Netherlands by an interim Board led by Warren Sako.

== Emergence of New Entity ==
As of 2014 the International CoCoa Farmers Organization(ICCFO) based in Lelystad, the fourth-largest city of the Netherlands, merged with the International CoCoa Farmers Organization (ICCFO) legally, with branch and regional head office for Africa, in the Ivory Coast.
