= Cabruca =

Type of cacao farm

A cabruca is a specific type of cacao farm in which tree cover is preserved to provide shade.

The government of Brazil defines a cabruca as a "cocoa cultivation system that exists under the protection of at least 40 native Atlantic Forest trees that grow intermittently and are surrounded by native vegetation." The state of Bahia requires only 20 native Atlantic Forest trees per hectare. About 60 percent of the cocoa production in Bahia takes place on cabruca farms.

== Ecological significance ==
Many forest-dwelling species that otherwise require closed-canopy habitat can survive on cabrucas. For example, several types of tree-dwelling frogs have been found on cabrucas.
