= Types of cocoa beans =

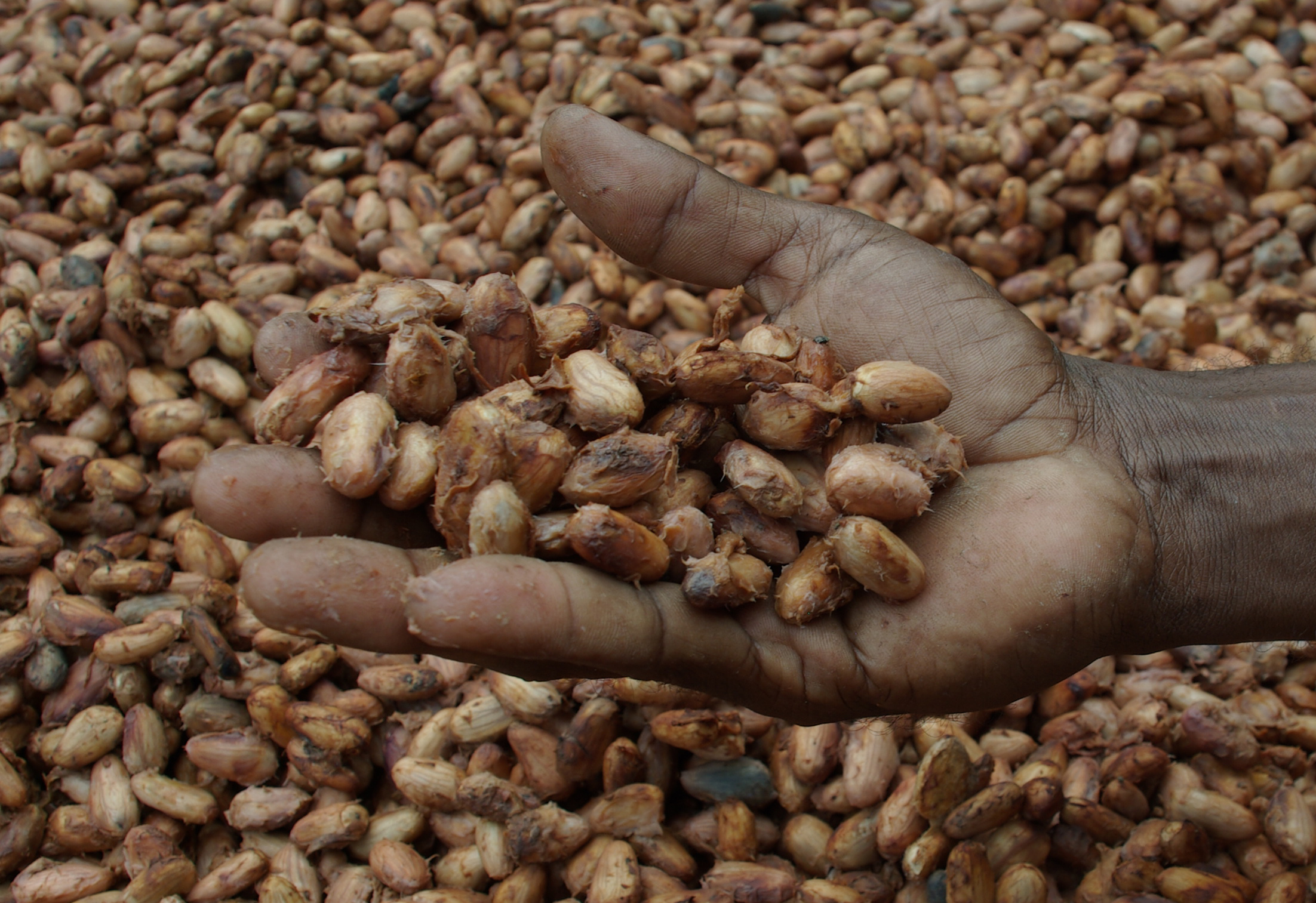
Cocoa beans drying in the sun

There are different categories of cocoa beans. The traditional varieties of Forastero, Criollo and Trinitario, while still used in marketing materials, are no longer considered to have a botanical basis.

The categories bulk and flavor cocoa are used to distinguish quality of beans. As of 2017, 95% of cocoa produced was bulk cocoa.

== Traditional varieties ==
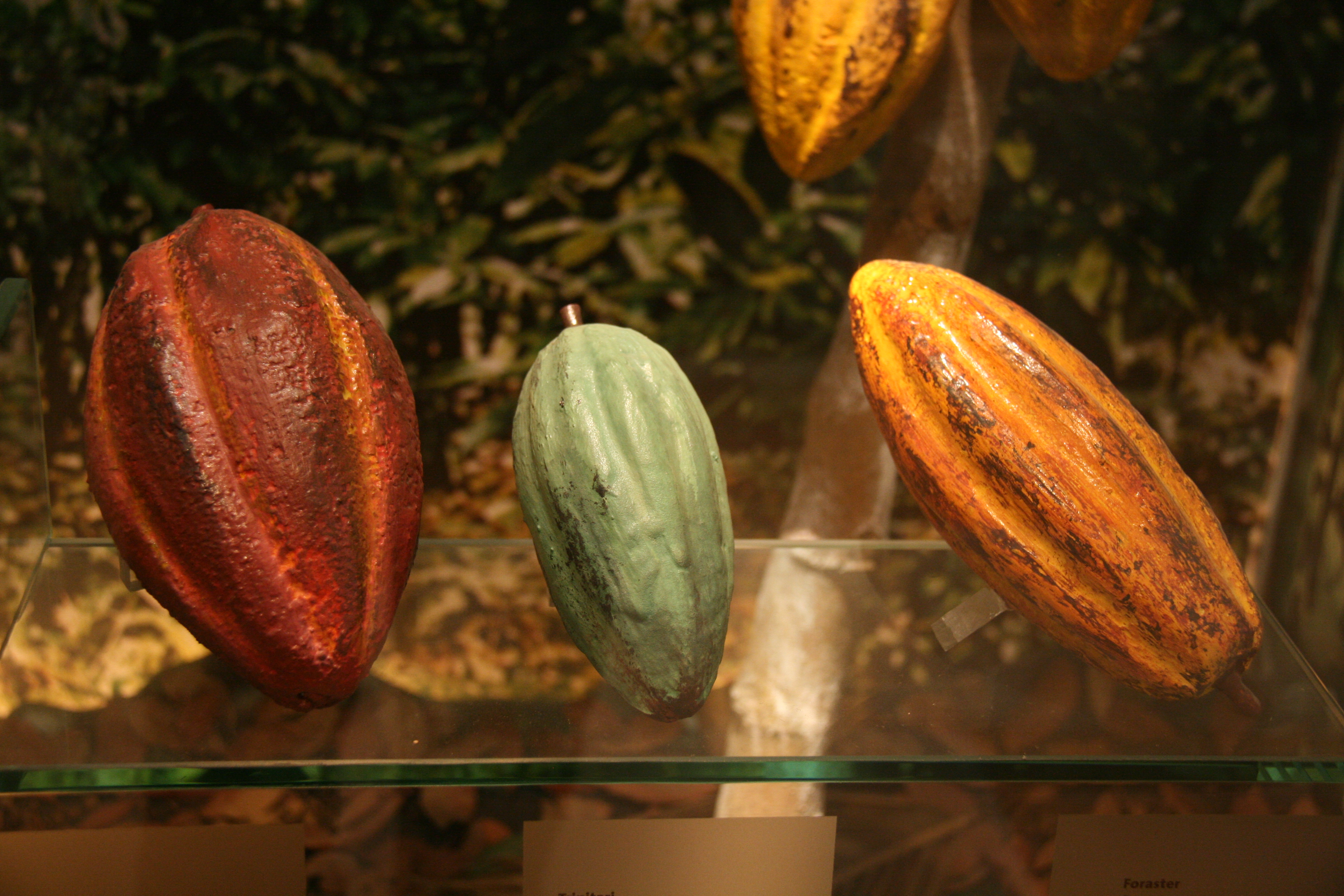
The three traditional varieties: Forastero, Trinitario, and Criollo

Cocoa beans are traditionally classified into three main varieties: Forastero, Criollo and Trinitario. Use of these terms has changed across different contexts and times, and recent genetic research has found that the categories of Forastero and Triniario are better understood as geohistorical inventions rather than as having a botanical basis. They are still used frequently in marketing material.

=== Criollo ===
Criollo has traditionally been the most prized variety. Criollo trees are presumed to be native to South America. Over time, they were grown in Mesoamerica, where they were encountered by the Spanish conquistadors. The word Criollo is derived from Creole, meaning native, authentic, and indigenous. The Spanish called cocoa trees planted in Venezuela Criollo; but they actually came from neighboring Mexico and Guatemala.

=== Forastero ===
After European colonialization, population decline and disease led to the Spanish and Portuguese replacing cacao crops with new varieties found in South America. These were referred to as Forastero, which can be translated as strange or foreign because of how they looked and tasted different from the Criollo variety.

Forastero strains are generally of the Amelonado type. They are associated with West Africa.

=== Trinitario ===
The name for any combination between Criollo and Forastero. They were named after the Caribbean island of Trinidad, where in 1724 the first hybrid of Venezuelan Criollo and Amelonado is understood to have been created. This was more disease-resistant than Criollo, while tasting better than Forastero.

== Modern varieties ==
Researchers in 2008 identified ten genetic clusters of Theobroma cacao, with 36 sub-clusters containing at least five specimens. These new types were Amelonado, Contamana, Criollo, Curaray, Guiana, Iquitos, Marañon, Nacional, Nanay, and Purús. Research in 2022 added the Caquetá type, found in Colombia.

The notion that each tree is a certain type, for example Criollo or Amelonado, has been challenged by research showing single trees producing cocoa pods of different types. Single pods have even been found with seeds of different types.

=== CCN-51 ===
As of 2015, CCN-51 was a very popular strain of cacao. It was very controversial, described by large chocolate manufacturers as a solution to increasing demand for chocolate, and criticized by advocates of flavor cocoa.

=== Nacional ===
The modern Nacional is a hybrid of the ancestral Nacional with Criollo and Amelonado. The bean is considered floral.

== Industrial classifications ==
=== Bulk ===
Bulk cocoa generally comes from what is traditionally designated Forastero-type trees. As of 2017, 95% of cocoa beans produced were classified as bulk cocoa.

=== Specialty ===
Specialty cocoa is an umbrella term usually describing cocoa that has consistent and verifiable special attributes. These attributes are distinguished by country, along lines including management, origin and quality. It contains fine and flavor cocoa, fair-trade, heirlooms, organic, sustainable and other certified cocoas.

==== Fair trade ====
This is cocoa certified as produced according to certain ethical requirements, such as being purchased for a minimum price from farmers.

==== Fine and flavor ====
Flavor cocoa is cocoa that is sold at a premium. It may be from specific geographical regions, crops or varieties, or use specific drying or fermenting techniques.

== Sources ==
=== Books ===
- Fowler, Mark S; Coutel, Fabien (2017). "Cocoa beans: from tree to factory". In Beckett, Stephen T; Fowler, Mark S; Ziegler, Gregory R (eds.). Beckett's Industrial Chocolate Manufacture and Use (5th ed.). West Sussex, UK: Wiley. ISBN 978-1-118-78014-5.
- Leissle, Kristy (2018). Cocoa. Polity. ISBN 978-1-5095-1320-8. OCLC 988580966.

=== Journals ===
- Martin, Carla D; Sampeck, Kathryn E (2015). "The bitter and sweet of chocolate in Europe". Socio.hu Social Science Review. 5 (SI3): 37–60. doi:10.18030/socio.hu.2015en.37. eISSN 2063-0468.
- Fouet, Olivier; Loor Solórzano, Rey Gastón; Rhoné, Bénédicte; Subía, Cristian; Calderón, Darío; Fernández, Fabián; Sotomayor, Ignacio; Rivallan, Ronan; Colonges, Kelly; Vignes, Hélène; Angamarca, Freddy; Yaguana, Byron; Costet, Pierre; Argout, Xavier; Lanaud, Claire (October 27, 2022). "Collection of native Theobroma cacao L. accessions from the Ecuadorian Amazon highlights a hotspot of cocoa diversity". Plants, People, Planet. 4 (6): 605–617. Bibcode:2022PlPP....4..605F. doi:10.1002/ppp3.10282.
- Wattnem, Tamara; Wiegel, Jennifer; González, Carolina; Reyes, Byron (July 3, 2022). "Who Defines Fine Chocolate? The Construction of Global Cocoa Quality Standards from Latin America". The International Journal of Sociology of Agriculture and Food. 28 (1). doi:10.48416/ijsaf.v28i1.448.
