= Jama-Coaque Ecological Reserve =

Protected area of Pacific Equatorial Forest in coastal Ecuador

Coordinates: 0°06′56.8″S 80°07′29.5″W

The Jama-Coaque Ecological Reserve (Reserva Ecológica Jama-Coaque) is a 850-hectare (2,100-acre) protected area of Pacific Equatorial Forest in coastal Ecuador. It is one of the last significant remnants of tropical moist forest and premontane cloud forest in the region between the Andes Mountains and the Pacific Ocean in Ecuador. It is estimated that only 2% of the native forest still remains in coastal Ecuador. The Jama-Coaque Ecological Reserve is owned and managed by Third Millennium Alliance (TMA), a non-profit conservation foundation. It is part of the Tumbes-Chocó-Magdalena biodiversity hotspot as designated by Conservation International.

== Location ==
The Jama-Coaque Ecological Reserve is located along the Jama-Coaque Coastal Mountain Range in northwestern Ecuador, in the heart of the Pacific Equatorial Forest. It is 19 km (12 miles) south of the equator and 7 km (4.5 miles) inland from the Pacific Ocean in the Upper Camarones River Basin. It is 3 km (2 miles) inland from the small agricultural community of Camarones and approximately equidistant from the mid-sized coastal towns of Jama and Pedernales in the province of Manabí. The Bamboo House Research Station is located within the reserve.

== History ==
The Jama-Coaque Ecological Reserve was established by Third Millennium Alliance in 2007, initially as a 38-hectare (95-acre) private reserve along the peaks of the coastal mountain range. From 2008 to 2011, the reserve expanded to 237 ha (586 acres) through 5 subsequent land purchases, and presently covers 57% of the Upper Camarones River Basin. The reserve takes its name from the ancient kingdom that thrived in the region from 355 B.C. to 1532 A.D.

== Ecology ==
The Jama-Coaque Ecological Reserve climbs from 258 m (846 feet) elevation, along the Camarones River, to a maximum elevation of 700 m (2,290 feet) elevation at the peak of Cerro Sagrado mountain. The lowland part of the reserve is characterized by tropical moist evergreen forest and transition to tropical rainforest. Starting at approximately 580 m (1,900 feet) of elevation, the forest rapidly transitions to premontane cloud forest, owing to the nearly constant fog layer along the crests of the coastal mountain range. The Jama-Coaque Ecological Reserve protects the headwaters of the Camarones River and three tributaries.

== Climate ==
The Jama-Coaque Ecological Reserve is subject to a tropical monsoon climate. Although it receives abundant rainfall like that of the tropical rain forest climate, rainfall is concentrated in the high-sun season, which is late December through May. The reserve is located onshore from the changeover between the Humboldt and El Niño ocean currents, which place it at the transition zone between some of the wettest forests in the world (the Chocó rainforests in Colombia) and the driest desert in the world (the Atacama in Peru and Chile). Starting in late December, a change in atmospheric pressure shifts ocean currents so that warm waters from the El Niño current come closer to shore and displace the cold waters of the Humboldt current. The result is warmer air temperatures and heavy rainfall that used to last through August, but now usually only lasts into May. The dry season, which now begins in June or July and can last into mid January, is characterized by cooler temperatures and more overcast skies. The Bamboo House research station in the Jama-Coaque Ecological Reserve records an average daily temperature range of 24–31 °C (75–88 °F) in the rainy season and 19–28 °C (66–82 °F) in the dry season. Annual rainfall in the lowland moist forests of the Jama-Coaque Ecological Reserve averages 1,000–1,500 mm (39–59 inches). The total annual water intake of the cloud forest is estimated to exceed 2,000 mm (79 inches), owing to fog drip, a process in which moisture from the clouds the hover along the peaks of the mountains is stripped by the surfaces of vegetation and condenses into water that drips to the forest floor.

== Wildlife ==
The Jama-Coaque Ecological Reserve serves as habitat and key migratory channel for six endangered species of felines (jaguar, puma, ocelot, oncilla, margay, and jaguarundi) and two endangered species of primates (mantled howler monkey and white-fronted capuchin monkey). Other endangered mammals include the tayra, the three-toed sloth, the western agouti, and the spotted paca. In 2009, herpetologist Paul S. Hamilton discovered two new species of frog in the cloud forest of the Jama-Coaque Ecological Reserve.
