= Pacific Equatorial Forest =

The Pacific Equatorial Forest (also known as the Pacific Forest of Ecuador) is a tropical forest ecosystem located along Ecuador's coastal mountain range at 0° latitude, primarily concentrated in northwestern Manabí. The ecosystem is most notable for its high diversity of forest types in unusually close proximity. Tropical rainforest, moist evergreen forest, premontane cloud forest, and tropical deciduous forest can all be encountered over the course of a one-day hike, and the transition from one forest type to another can occur in as little as 500 meters.

The Pacific Forest of Ecuador is considered among the most threatened tropical forests in the world. It occupies the geographic center of the Tumbes-Chocó-Magdalena biodiversity hotspot. As much as 98% of coastal tropical forest have already been lost in Ecuador, which primarily occurred over the last three generations. The Pacific Equatorial Forest, in particular, represents the greatest concentration of unprotected forest in coastal Ecuador and has been designated by several international conservation organizations as a global conservation priority.

== Location ==
The Pacific Equatorial Forests is bound by the shores of the Pacific Ocean to the west and the peaks of the long and narrow Jama-Coaque Coastal Mountain Range, which stretches along the coast at an average distance of 10 km inland. The Pacific Equatorial Forest extends as far south as Cabo Posado, at 0 degrees and 22 minutes south of the equator, and as far north as Pedernales, at 0 degrees and 3 minutes north of the equator. However, patches of the ecosystem can be found as far north as Punta Tortuga and Galera at 0 degrees and 46 minutes north of the equator.

The core area of the Pacific Equatorial Forest covers two counties, Jama and Pedernales, in the northwest of the province of Manabí in Ecuador. The Jama-Coaque mountains (pronounced "Hama Ko-Ah-Kay") takes its name from the ancient civilization that thrived in the region from 355 B.C. to 1532 A.D; whose territory is believed to have been limited to this specific ecosystem and the adjacent coastline. The Pacific Equatorial Forest covers 650 square kilometres, or 65,000 hectares of land, of which approximately 19,000 hectares are still forested.

== Climate ==
The Pacific Equatorial Forest is subject to what is known as a tropical monsoon climate. The ecosystem is located directly adjacent to the changeover from the cold and dry Humboldt ocean current from southern Chile and the warm El Niño ocean current (also known as the Equatorial Counter Current) from Panama. The cold water and air temperatures associated with the Humboldt Current inhibit rainfall in southern coastal Ecuador and Peru, creating dry to arid conditions, whereas the warm temperaturas associated with the El Nino current create humid conditions with high rainfall in northern Ecuador and coastal Colombia.

For its location at the confluence of these two ocean currents, the Pacific Equatorial Forest is a transition zone between the wettest forests (the Chocó in Colombia) and the driest desert (the Atacama in Peru) recorded on earth. This complex climatological effect is multiplied by the Jama-Coaque Coastal Mountain Range, whose sharp changes in altitude so close to the ocean account for wide variations in precipitation in very small expanses of land. The mountains rise to 845 metres (2,772 feet) above sea level at the highest peak, although the rest of the mountain range is a series of peaks that average 500–650 metres (1,640–2,130 ft) of altitude, which are shrouded in fog most of the year.

Starting in late December, a change in atmospheric pressure shifts ocean currents so that warm waters come closer to shore and displace the cold waters. During this time, air and water temperatures, tides, sea levels and wave heights, and relative humidity all rise. These conditions produce heavy rainfall that used to last through August, but now usually only lasts into May. Rain during the rainy season is punctuated by sunny weather.

The dry season, which now begins in June or July and lasts sometimes into mid January, is characterized by cooler temperatures and more overcast skies. The Bamboo House research station in the Jama-Coaque Ecological Reserve has recorded an average daily temperature range of 24–31 °C (75–88 °F) in the rainy season, and 19–29 °C (66–84 °F) in the dry season. Throughout the entire coast of Ecuador, annual precipitation varies widely according to latitude, with as much as 8,000 mm of rain in the extreme north, close to the Colombian border, to as little as 300 mm in the extreme south, close to the Peruvian border.

In the Pacific Equatorial Forest, which is located in between these two extremes, precipitation primarily varies according to elevation and proximity to the ocean. In the premontane cloud forest along the peaks of the coastal mountains, which strip wáter from the nearly constant cloud cover, annual precipitation is 2,000-3,000 mm, and the vegetation is green and lush year-round. Along the shoreline, annual rainfall can be as little as 800 mm, and in these much drier conditions the majority of trees shed their leaves during the dry season, creating tropical deciduous forest (also known as tropical dry forest).

== Wildlife ==
The Pacific Equatorial Forest provides habitat for serves as habitat and key migratory channel for two endangered species of primates; the (mantled howler monkey and white-fronted capuchin monkey)and six endangered species of felines, the (jaguar, puma, ocelot, oncilla, margay and jaguarundi). Other endangered mammals include the tayra, the three-toed sloth, the western agouti, and the spotted paca.

Endemic and/or rare species of birds include the Red-Masked Parakeet, Pale-browed Tinamou, Pacific Pygmy Owl, Esmeralda Woodstar hummingbird, Gray-backed Hawk, Guayaquil Woodpecker, Pacific Royal-Flycatcher, Plumbeous Kite, Rufous-headed Chachalaca, and the Chocó Toucan.

In 2009, herpetologist Paul S. Hamilton discovered thirty new species of frog and one new species of snake in three remnants of Pacific Equatorial Forest (Lalo Loor Dry Forest Reserve, Jama-Coaque Ecological Reserve, and Cerro Pata de Pajaro).

== Threats ==
The primary cause of deforestation in the region is the conversion of native forest into cattle pasture, a process which is aided by illegal logging and slash-and-burn agriculture. The deforestation figure in all of coastal Ecuador is 98%. The Pacific Equatorial Forest, which has suffered an estimated loss of 75% of its native forest, has thus fared somewhat better than the rest of the region owing to its limited access and more challenging topography. However, the construction of a new coastal highway through the region threatens to facilitate the deforestation of the last remnants of Pacific Equatorial Forest.

In 2001, the Centro de Investigación de Bosques Tropicales (Tropical Forest Research Center) reported: "Due to the high rate of endemism, the mass elimination of forest habitat in the Coastal region over the last half-century represents one of the greatest species extinction events in history." The human consequences of regional deforestation have likewise been significant. The dramatic loss of forest cover over the last 50 years has altered the rain cycle and caused a sharp decline in regional precipitation.

Whereas three generations ago the rainy season lasted eight months per year and the dry season four, that ratio has inverted, and now the rainy season barely lasts four months, followed by eight months of drought. Rivers that used to be viable year-round now run dry half of the year, crops fail, and droughts result in high death rates of livestock, an effect which is particularly acute during periods of the La Nina ocean-atmosphere phenomenon.

== Conservation status ==
There are three private ecological reserves that protect remnants of the Pacific Equatorial Forest: Cerro Pata de Pajaro (Fundación Tercer Mundo), the Lalo Loor Dry Forest Reserve (Lalo Loor and family), and the Jama-Coaque Ecological Reserve (Third Millennium Alliance), which protect 1,000 acres, 500 acres, and 1,500 acres respectively.

The Three Forest Trail, established in 2010, is a 25-km-long trail that connects the dry forest of the Lalo Loor Dry Forest Reserve with the rainforest of the Jama-Coaque Ecological Reserve via the cloud-forested mountain ridges. The trail is meant to function as an incentive for conservation, as all forest owners along the trail receive a percentage of the trail fees.

However, the vast majority of the Pacific Equatorial Forest remains unprotected and continued to be logged and cleared for agriculture and cattle ranching. In 2009 the Ecuadorian Ministry of the Environment launched its Socio Bosque (Forest Partners) program, which provides forest owners with an annual conservation subsidy of $30 per hectare ($12/acre). The program gained some traction in the region but the long-term efficacy is still uncertain.
