= Chocolate industry =

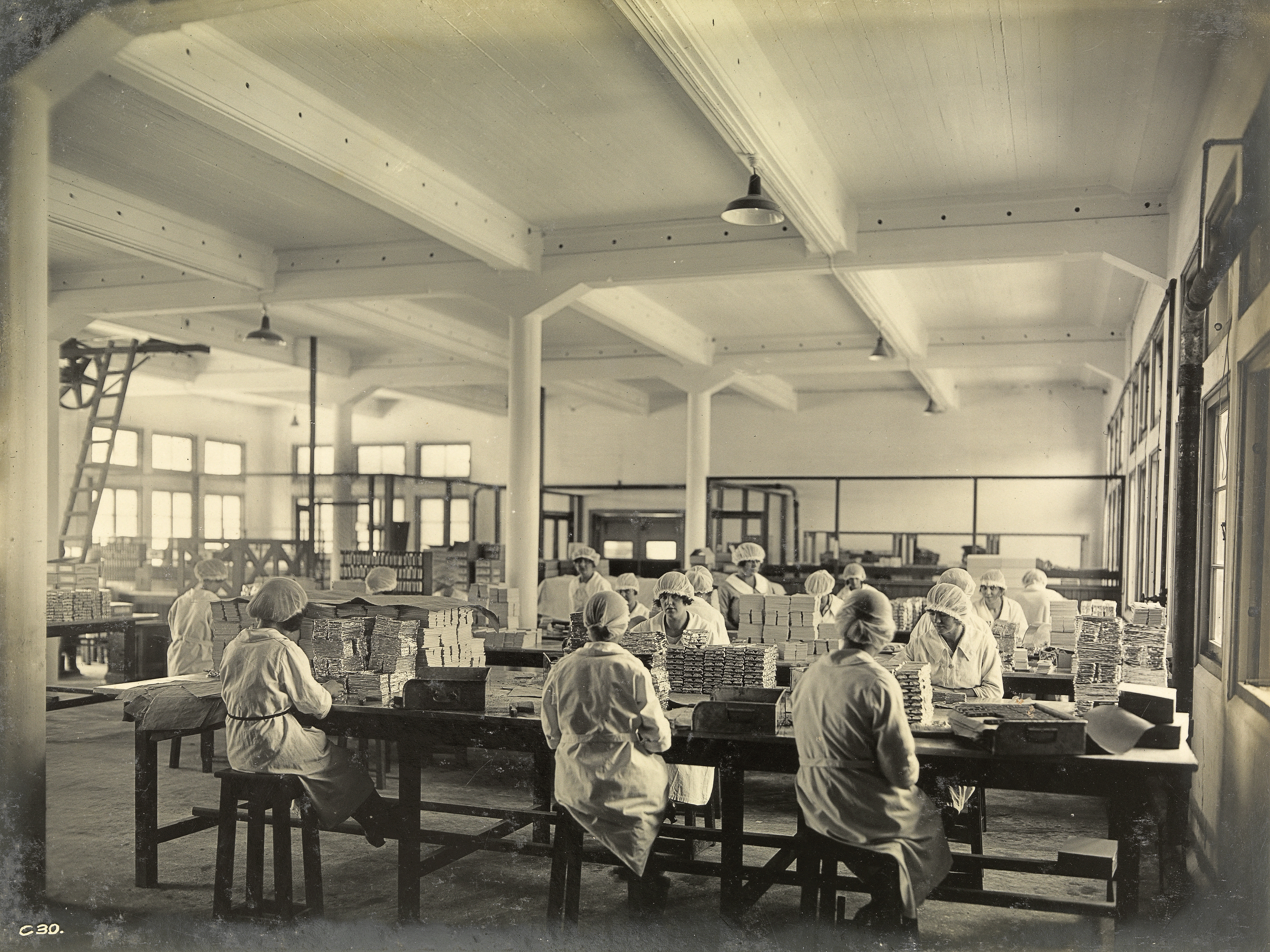
Workers wrap chocolate in Tasmania, Australia, in the 1920s

The chocolate industry is primarily made up of a small number of cocoa processors and chocolate manufacturers.

Worth US$105 billion in 2012, the chocolate industry makes up a slight majority of the global confectionery market, despite serving fewer, wealthier markets. Brands are segregated by territory, and evoke strong consumer loyalties. Chocolate is primarily purchased on impulse, but also as a gift, and, in the case of dark chocolate, sometimes for perceived health benefits.

The chocolate industry emerged in the 19th century, as technological developments allowed production to industrialize. It spread across the world in the 20th century.

== History ==
As of the start of the 19th century, chocolate making was the domain of small producers. As chocolate making technology advanced, chocolate was able to be produced at scale, and in the 1850s, Western chocolate makers gained prominence for the first time. Across the 19th century, further developments in technology created chocolate as it is eaten today. In 1875, the first milk chocolate bar was sold in Switzerland, and Cadbury followed with a coarse-textured milk chocolate bar 20 years later.

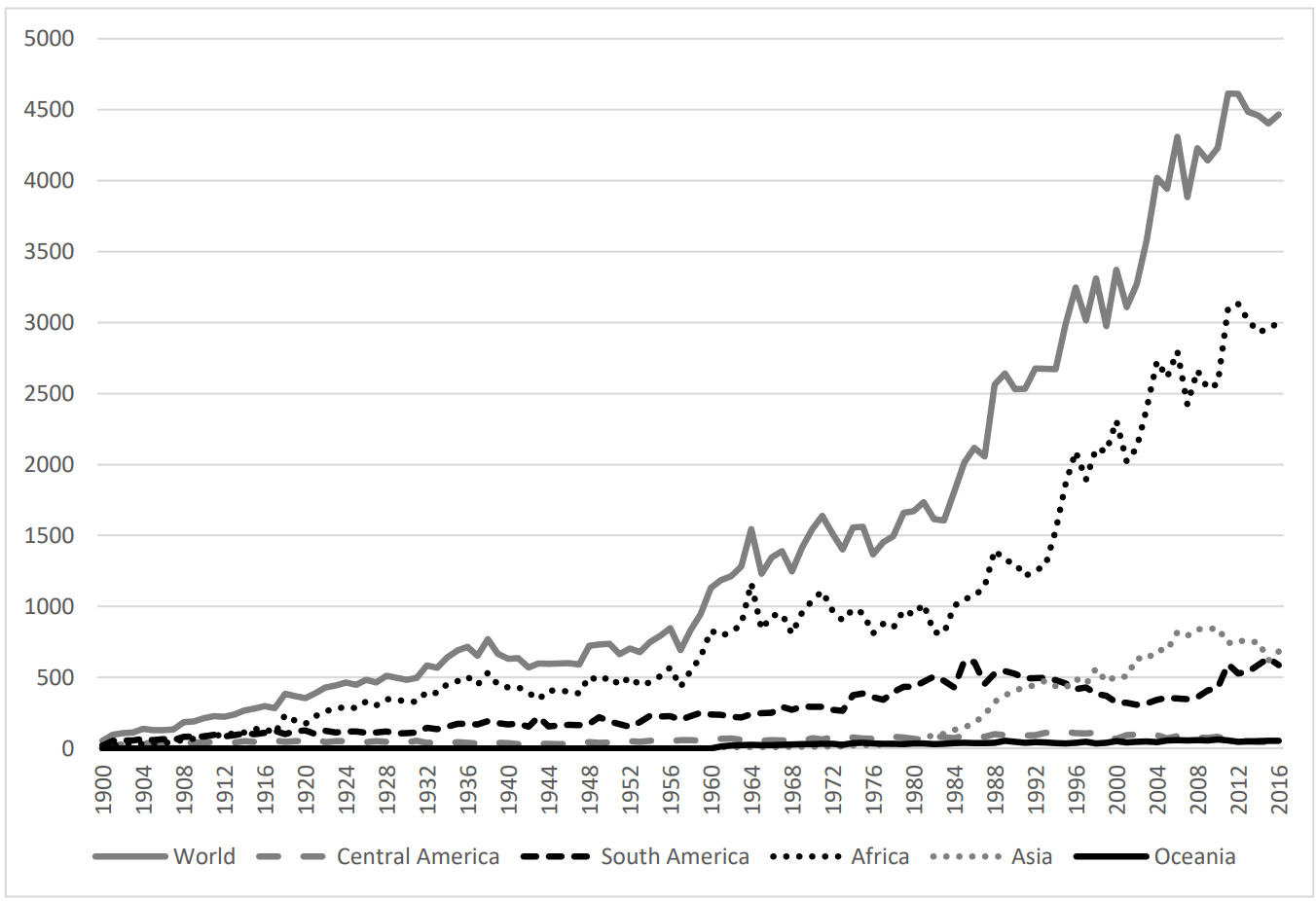
World production of cocoa beans (1900–2016), by region, in tonnes

At the beginning of the 20th century, a chocolate market began to develop in the UK, US, and former British dominions as several products still eaten today were created, including Cadbury Dairy Milk in the UK in 1905 and Hershey's Kisses in America in 1907. Manufacturers in the US at this time and for decades after struggled with the lack of air conditioning technology. In the summers of 1920s Connecticut, one manufacturer only made their chocolate confectionery at night, and sold the rest door-to-door in the early morning. Chocolate was introduced to new populations in World War II, through the activity of the British and US armies.

In the post-war period, consumption in developed countries grew as incomes rose and a larger range of foods were eaten. Chocolate was increasingly exported across the globe. Over 20 years at the end of the 20th century, cocoa processors consolidated through corporate acquisitions, shrinking from most processing being undertaken by 40 companies to three: Barry Callebaut, Cargill and Olam. As of 1994, an estimated 15–20% of chocolate was eaten by itself. The rest was eaten in other products: coating ice creams, biscuits and interiors such as nuts. Since the creation of Green & Black's that year, Fair trade cocoa has grown among a broader trend of promoting better working conditions for cocoa producers. When the European dispute ended over including fats in chocolate, Robert Linxe wrote that industrial chocolate manufacturers already included fats, but concealed the fact.

== Composition ==
=== Processers (grinders) ===
As of 2015, about 60% of cocoa processing was undertaken by Barry Callebaut, Cargill and Olam. During the 2000s, these firms moved processing to cocoa producing countries, citing motives of reducing poverty in these areas. Global studies scholar Kristy Leissle has argued that instead this is done to reduce tax obligations.

=== Manufacturers ===
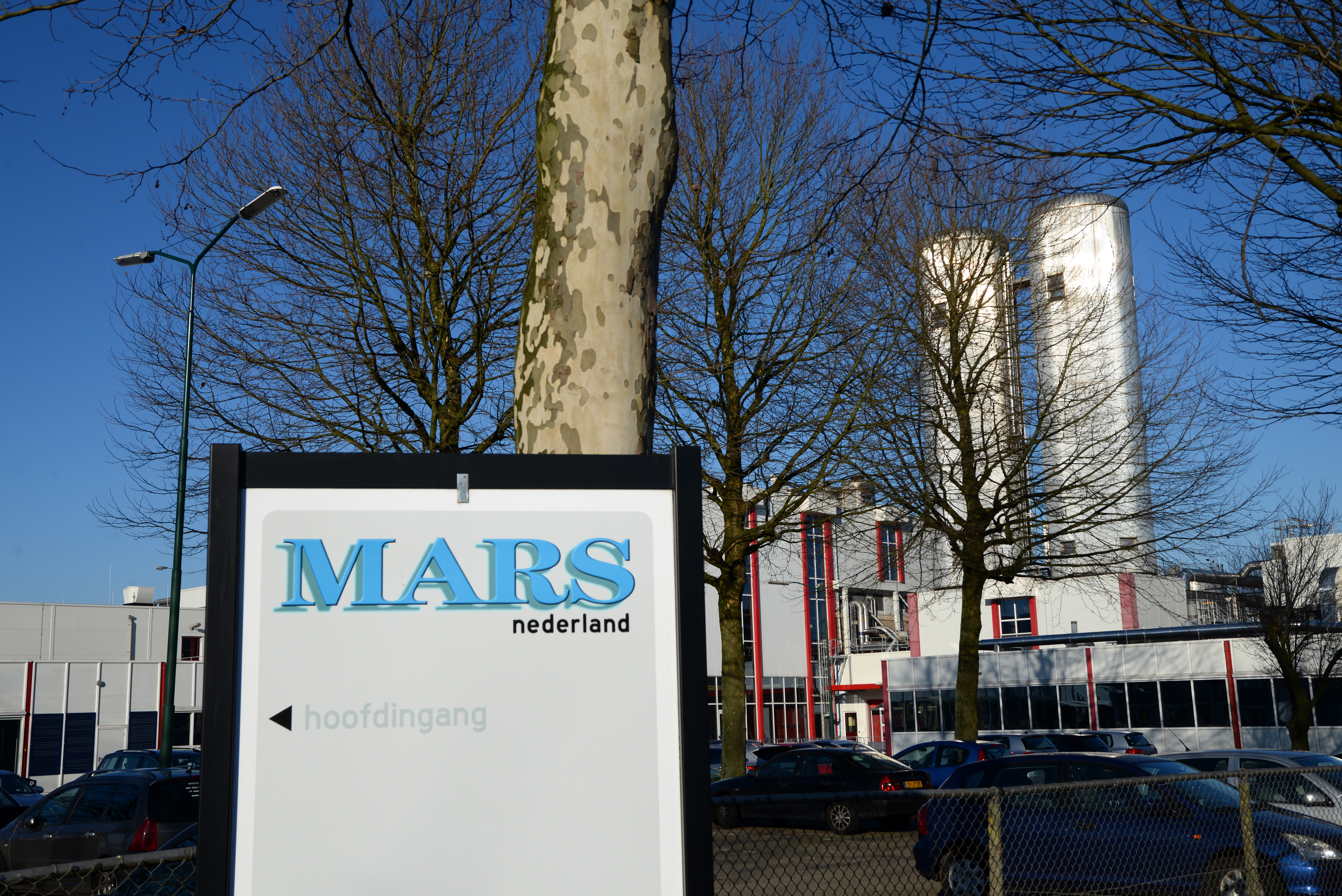
Mars Inc., the largest chocolate manufacturer in 2015.

Although chocolate companies come in a range of sizes, including small, artisan producers, most of the world's chocolate market is made by a few, large companies. In 2015, five firms: Mars Inc., Mondelēz International (owners of Cadbury), Ferrero, Nestlé and The Hershey Company held 61.8% of the global chocolate market share. Other chocolate companies with the largest revenue included Meiji Co., Lindt, Arcor, Glico and Storck. (Note: Companies excluded that are not primarily chocolate manufacturers) Chocolate is more concentrated than the broader confectionery industry, as the latter markets a broad range of products, and in poorer markets sells through informal means (such as street markets in India). Concentration has increased in the 21st century, as firms have attempted to reduce the buying power of food retailers and to establish markets in new countries.

Beyond production, large chocolate manufacturers allocate large funds to research and development. The chocolate industry uses sugar, milk and cocoa products as inputs, as well as large amounts of inclusions, such as nuts, dried fruits and coconut to add variety in texture and taste.

The US is the biggest producer of chocolate. Other large producers include Brazil, Germany, Russia and the UK.

== Consumer market ==
As of 2012, the global chocolate market was valued at around US$105 billion, making up a little over half of the overall confectionery market. During the 2010s, growth was most pronounced in developing countries, but consumption remains low in poor regions where sugar confectionery is more affordable, and in warmer climes where chocolate melts at ambient temperatures. As of 2012, the US consumed the most chocolate, followed by Russia. In South America, Brazil consumed the most chocolate by a large margin, while in Western Europe, which consumes the most chocolate per capita, Germany and the UK had the largest consumer markets.

In Europe, the main chocolate brands are around 95 years old, unusually old for the food and drink industry. The long history of several major chocolate brands, such as Kit Kat, created in the 1930s, and Cadbury Dairy Milk, created in the early 20th century, has generated strong brand loyalty, and a small market for private label chocolates. As such, manufacturers generally introduce new products as additions to existing lines.

What firm's chocolate is eaten depends on the region: as of 2009, Cadbury had a strong presence in the UK, Australia, Ireland and New Zealand, and Kraft was particularly present in Brazil, and, through its Milka brand, continental Europe.

=== Motivations ===
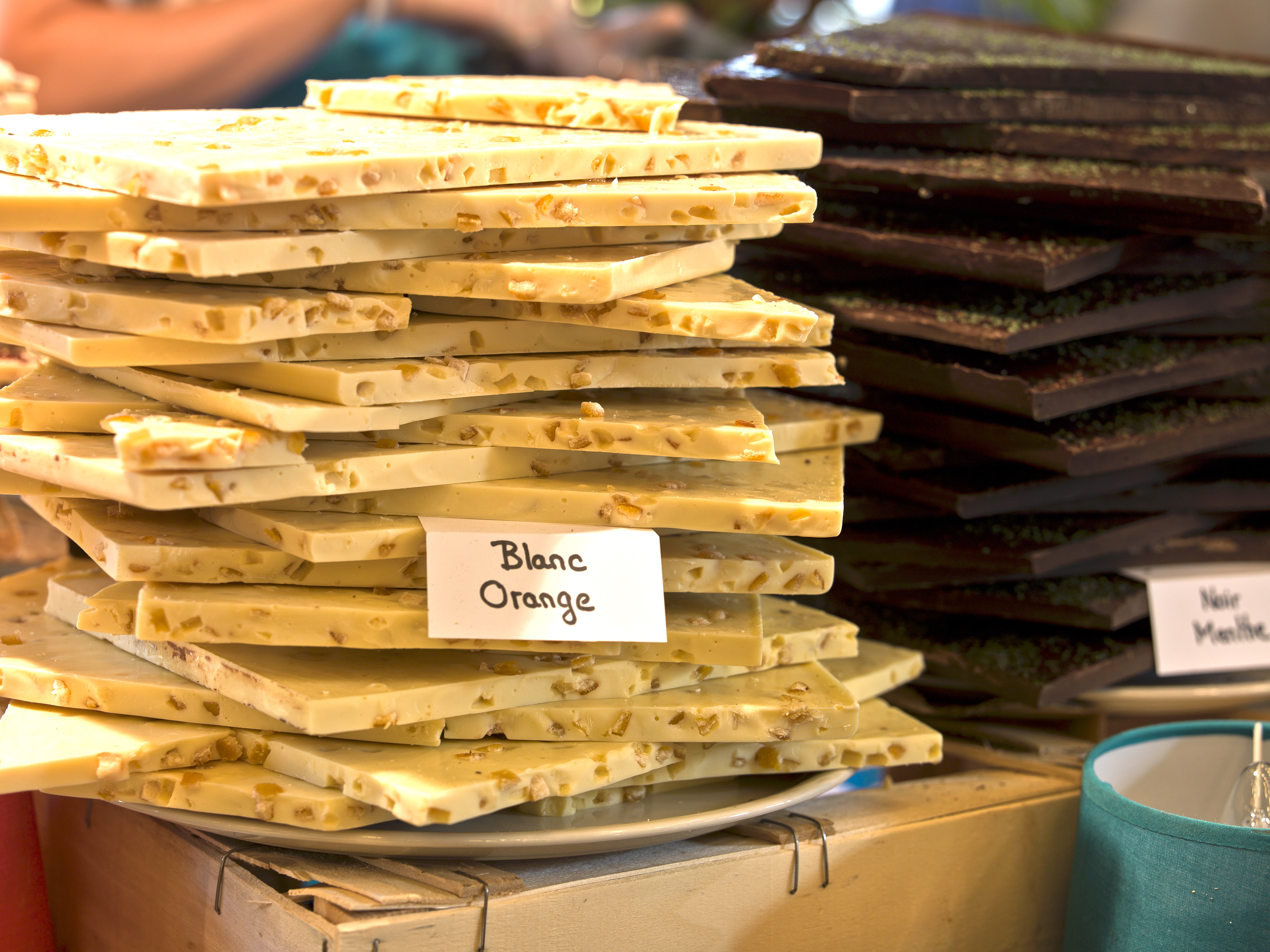
Craft white chocolate

By 2018, the American consumer market for chocolate, and snacks more generally, had split into two market segments: those primarily motivated by the experience of consumption (e.g. taste, texture), and those who looked for non-consumption attributes such as craft production and ethics such as localism and environmentalism.

Worldwide, chocolate's strong market penetration can be credited to its reputation as an affordable indulgence. It is primarily purchased on impulse, as a snack. This popularity is illustrated in a 2014 Nielsen market research survey of 30,000 consumers worldwide, which found chocolate the most popular snack (higher than fresh fruit). The study found chocolate as a snack marginally more popular among women.

More intentionally, chocolate is purchased as a gift to convey love, remorse among a range of other emotions. This is concentrated around seasons, particularly Easter, but also Christmas, Valentine's Day and Halloween, which can account for large portions of the total chocolate consumed per year. For instance, in Brazil, Easter eggs account for 20% of yearly chocolate intake, and in the UK, almost 70% of boxed chocolate is consumed during the Christmas and holiday season.

Perceptions of health benefits around dark chocolate consumption have driven an increase in consumption, albeit at the expense of milk chocolate consumption.

== Public health ==
The chocolate industry has been criticized by public health advocates, for the role of sugar on obesity rates. This criticism has been most pronounced in markets like the US and UK.

== Legal regulations ==
International and national regulations govern what can be marketed as chocolate. International standards are laid out in the Codex Alimentarius, which is revised very infrequently: as of 2017 it had not been changed since 2003. Given the Codex requirements, participating countries can choose to accept them in full or in a modified form. Participating countries include all members of the World Trade Organization, which, upon joining, are obliged to base their domestic standards on international agreements such as the Codex.

== See also ==
- Candy making
- List of bean-to-bar chocolate manufacturers
- List of chocolate companies

== Sources ==
- Allen, Lawrence L (2010). Chocolate Fortunes: The Battle for the Hearts, Minds, and Wallets of China's Consumers. Amacom. ISBN 978-0-8144-1432-3.
- Allen, Lawrence (June 4, 2018). "Global M&A: Still the chocolate industry sweetspot?". Thunderbird International Business Review. 61 (2): 455–456. doi:10.1002/tie.21996.
- Beckett, Stephen T.; Fowler, Mark S.; Ziegler, Gregory R., eds. (2017). Beckett's Industrial Chocolate Manufacture and Use (5th ed.). Chichester, West Sussex: Wiley. ISBN 978-1-118-78014-5.
  - Thomas, Jonathan. "The global chocolate confectionery market". In Beckett, Fowler & Ziegler (2017).
  - Wood, Richard. "Legal aspects of chocolate manufacture". In Beckett, Fowler & Ziegler (2017).
- Clarence-Smith, William Gervase (2000). Cocoa and Chocolate, 1765-1914. New York: Routledge. ISBN 978-1-134-60778-5.
- Leissle, Kristy (2018). Cocoa. Cambridge: Polity. ISBN 978-1-50951-320-8.
- Nuttall, C; Hart, W A (1994). "Chocolate marketing and other aspects of the confectionery industry worldwide". In Beckett, Stephen T (ed.). Beckett's Industrial Chocolate Manufacture and Use (2nd ed.). West Sussex, UK: Springer Science+Business Media. ISBN 978-1-4613-5879-4.
- Ramli, Nur Suhaili (2017). "A review of marketing strategies from the European chocolate industry". Journal of Global Entrepreneurship Research. 7 10. doi:10.1186/s40497-017-0068-0. hdl:10419/196990.
- Ribaut, Jean-Claude (December 8, 2003). "Le chocolat tient Salon à Paris" [Chocolate at the Salon in Paris]. Le Monde (in French). Archived from the original on April 11, 2021.
