= Dark chocolate =

Chocolate with high cocoa solid content

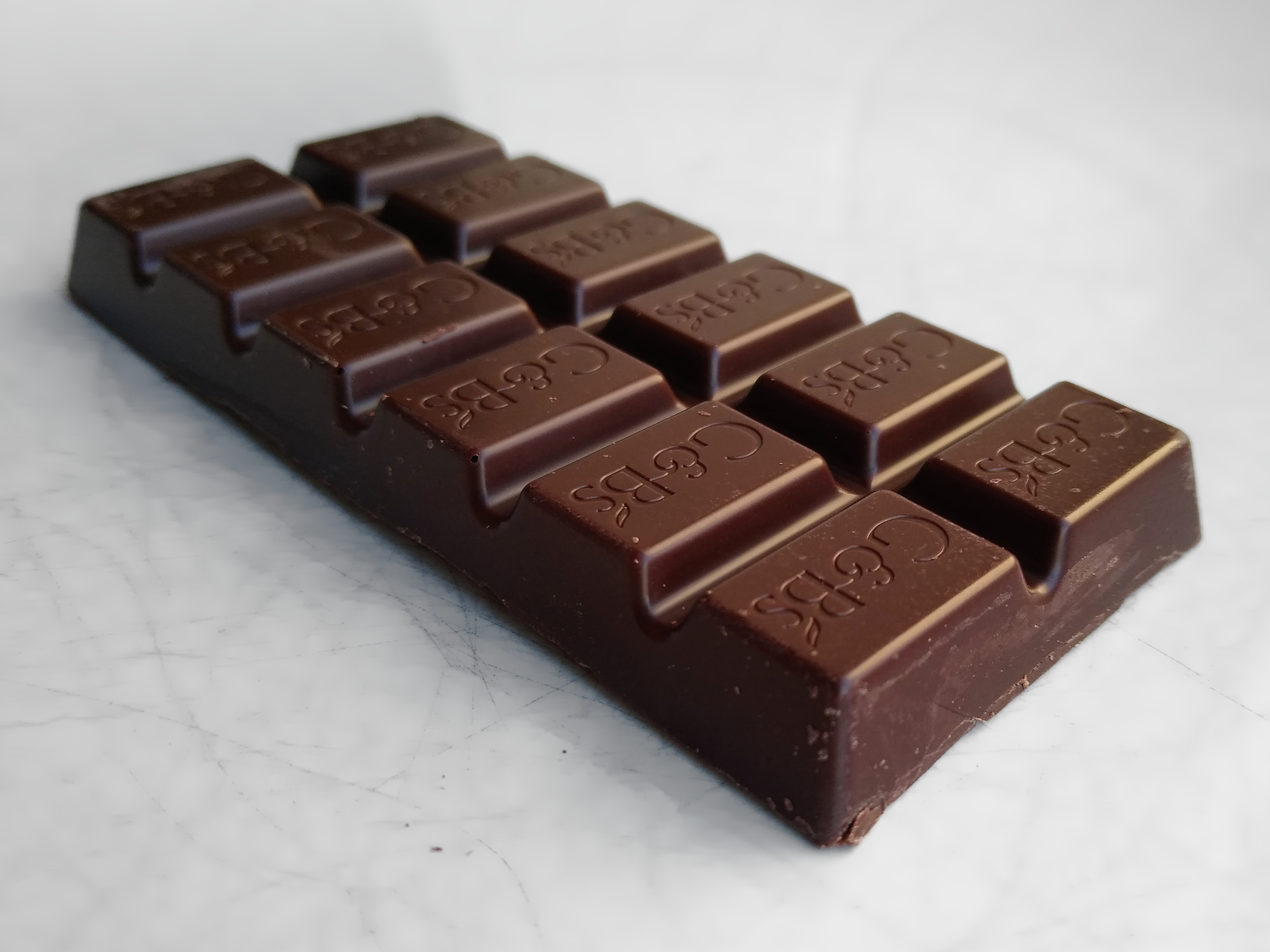
Dark chocolate containing 70% cocoa

Dark chocolate, also known as plain chocolate and black chocolate, is a form of chocolate made from chocolate liquor, cocoa butter and sugar. It has a higher cocoa percentage than white chocolate and milk chocolate. Dark chocolate is valued for its health benefits, and for its reputation as a sophisticated choice of chocolate. Like milk and white chocolate, dark chocolate is used to make chocolate bars and to coat confectionery.

Dark chocolate gained much of its reputation in the late 20th century, as French chocolatiers worked to establish dark chocolate as preferred over milk chocolate in the French national palate. As this preference was exported to countries such as the United States, associated values of terroir, bean-to-bar chocolate making and gourmet chocolate followed. Because of the high cocoa percentage, dark chocolate can contain particularly high amounts of heavy metals such as lead and cadmium.

Compared to other types of chocolate, dark chocolate has a more bitter and intense flavor, and is more reliant on the quality of its cocoa beans and cocoa butter ingredients. Dark chocolate is made by a process of mixing, refining, conching, and standardizing. Government and industry standards of what may be labeled "dark chocolate" vary by country and market.

== Terminology ==
In Britain, dark is also known as plain chocolate, although the term dark chocolate is now more common. It is known in East Asia as black chocolate, e.g. by the Japanese brand Ghana. Dark chocolates are sometimes categorized into sweet, semi-sweet, and bittersweet chocolate depending on the sugar content. Dark chocolate without added sugar is known as bitter chocolate or unsweetened chocolate.

The term fondant ("melting") dates to the invention of conching in 1879. While the term is no longer widely used, it survives in parts of Europe as a designation for dark chocolate.

== History ==
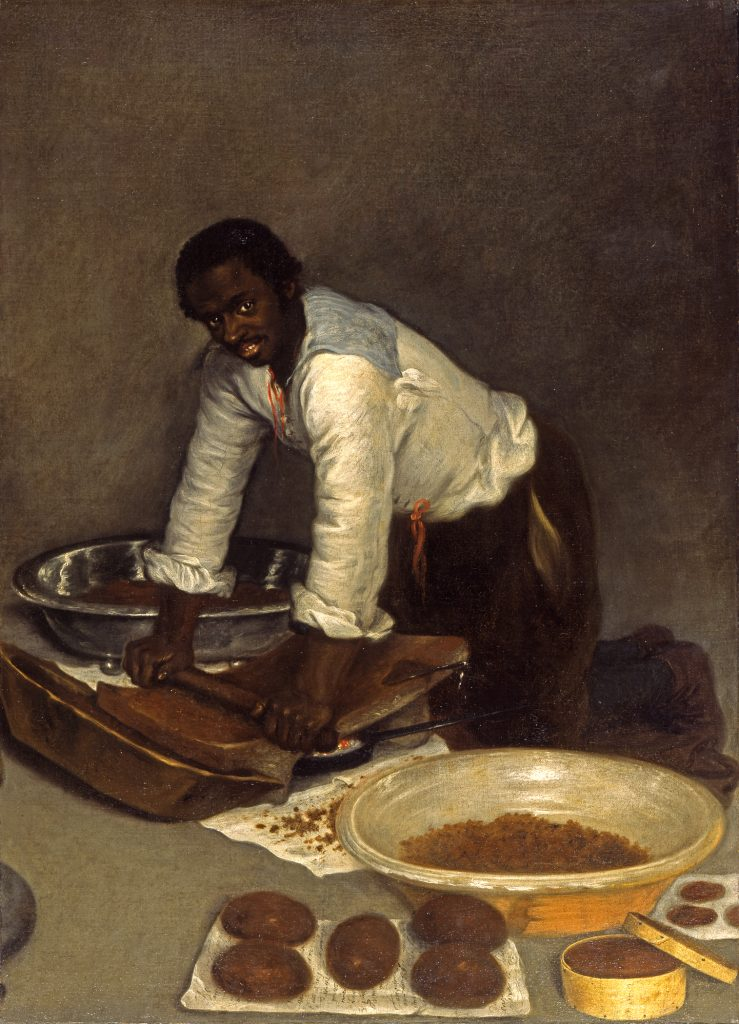
A Man Milling Cacao into Chocolate with a Metate and a Mano, canvas by unknown Spanish artist, early modern period

After the domestication of the cacao tree over 5000 years ago, indigenous Americans began producing cacao beverages. The earliest people known to have used the cacao plant are the ancient Mayo-Chinchipe people of what's now Ecuador in circa 3300 BC. While it is unclear when non-alcoholic cacao beverages were first consumed, some academics claim this occurred by 1650 BC. Other academics claim this occurred by circa 1800 BC by ancient Olmec people of what's now Mexico and Central America. When the Spanish conquistadors first tasted chocolate around 1520, there were many different variations of cacao beverages, of which one, made in the Guatemala, was referred to as chocolate. After this area became a dominant producer of cacao in the later 16th century, chocolate became the word for all cacao drinks. Europeans adapted chocolate with Old World ingredients, including sugar, and after bringing it to Europe, it spread and became popular among the elite. Over the following centuries it became simpler and less spiced.

Chocolate was made by combining different cocoa varieties from as early as the 18th century. Caracas cocoa was considered the most flavorful, while other, more bitter varieties were known to contain more cocoa butter. The proportions of these cocoas, as well as their overall percentage, made it possible to produce chocolate with the desired degree of fluidity and palatability. Quality (pure) chocolate contained only cocoa, sugar, and spices, whereas other types, described as "adulterated", also contained starches. While the latter were believed to be better suited for making beverages, the former, which often contained equal parts cocoa and sugar, were the most expensive and were the best suited for confectionery use and raw consumption. It is not known when cocoa butter was first added as an ingredient in eating chocolate, but it was likely used whenever it became affordable, as it allowed more sugar to be incorporated without compromising the chocolate's fluidity and palatability. Although references to the use of cocoa butter in chocolate-making remained rare until the end of the 19th century, a mid-century culinary guide already reveals cocoa butter-enriched couverture chocolate as a chocolatier's secret for coating chocolate pralines.

The quality of chocolate improved with the Industrial Revolution, particularly in France and neighboring countries. The use of melangers and roller mills made it possible to grind and refine chocolate paste until the desired degree of fineness was achieved. Advances in chocolate formulations and manufacturing techniques established France's reputation as the premier producer of eating chocolate.

Earlier, in 1828, Coenraad Johannes van Houten received a patent for the manufacturing process for making Dutch cocoa, removing cocoa butter from chocolate liquor. This process also laid the groundwork for the large-scale production of cocoa butter as a by-product, facilitating its subsequent use in mass-produced chocolate. Van Houten presses began to be adopted outside the Netherlands from the mid-19th century onwards, replacing earlier, less efficient presses.

In the late 19th century, chocolate would be improved further with a series of new techniques including conching and tempering. With the invention of the modern milk chocolate in 1875, the term dark chocolate was coined to distinguish the traditional chocolate from the new form. By 1899 in the United States, dark chocolate was considered masculine and inappropriate for children. For much of the following century in the US, dark chocolate was consumed not by itself, but together with other foods such as ice cream, nuts, and coconut. During the World Wars, dark chocolate was fortified with vitamins A, B_{1}, B_{2}, C, D, niacin and sometimes calcium to prevent malnutrition. As of the 1930s in Britain, dark chocolate was being sold in thin portions, and was sold for taste rather than taste and hunger as was done for milk chocolate. That decade, chocolate makers there began associating their dark chocolate products with upper-class women in their advertising. This was a response to market research of the time claiming dark chocolate was favored by the higher social classes, compared to a working class who preferred milk chocolate.

During the late 1970s, when the price of cocoa was very low, the palate of French connoisseurs moved strongly in favor of dark chocolates and against milk chocolate after advocacy from the chocolatier Robert Linxe. At the same time, some American consumers began to take interest in dark chocolates for the first time, often sourcing product from France and Belgium. The following decade, a nationwide campaign in France aimed to move the public to appreciate locally produced dark chocolates with sophisticated flavor. Taste makers and producers worked together to create flavor standards using concepts borrowed from wine connoisseurship. This was motivated by foreign firms capturing swathes of the French confectionery market at the expense of local chocolatiers. Simultaneously, high-quality dark chocolate began to be attributed psychoactive and possible aphrodisiac qualities due to its theobromine content. In America, broader recognition of dark as distinct from milk chocolate, and of the concepts of bean origin and the percentage of cocoa in the finished product, arose in the years following 1984, when the French chocolate manufacturer Valrhona entered the US market, selling initially to pastry and chocolate manufacturers and later to the general public.

In the 1990s, French flavor standards, having gained mass uptake domestically, were intentionally exported to the United States. These standards, laid out in published guides and chocolate tastings, evoked terroir, bean varietals and estate growths. Chocolate of high cocoa content and novel added flavors (such as pepper, ginger and fennel) was promoted and was sold at significantly higher cost than what had previously been consumed. By the late 2000s, a preference for dark chocolate was seen as the sign of a "discriminating palate" in the United States.

== Characteristics ==
Dark chocolate is harder than milk chocolate, because of its particle size and fat and lecithin content. It also has a more bitter and intense flavor than milk chocolate, due to a higher proportion of chocolate liquor (also known as cocoa mass), which contains theobromine, caffeine, l-leucine, and catechin flavonoids. Compared to other types of chocolate, dark relies more on the quality of cocoa beans, and the most highly flavored cocoa butters are reserved for dark chocolates. Dark chocolate can exhibit burnt, chocolate, smoky, nutty and sour flavors, among others. These variations are particularly noticeable among dark chocolates using single-origin cocoa beans. While the appeal of the taste of sugary, milky milk chocolate is often immediately apparent, dark chocolate's more complex flavors can make it more of an acquired taste. Perceptions of the intensity of flavor are correlated with color: darker chocolates are understood to have a more intense flavor.

Dark chocolate contains 60 compounds contributing to its flavor, with 33 of these considered particularly important. Basic and neutral compounds are responsible for a "chocolate" flavor, while acidic compounds contribute more sweet flavors. Some of these compounds are the product of Maillard reactions. Some manufacturers age dark chocolate to improve flavor. This is done at a minimum for a few weeks, and it is debated whether ageing for more time is desirable. The antioxidants in non-fat cocoa solids are responsible for preserving chocolate; dark chocolate has a shelf life of about two years, longer than milk chocolate, which contains not only fewer antioxidants but perishable milkfat. Dark chocolate can range in color from mahogany to black.

== Health effects ==
=== Nutrition ===
USDA "Dark chocolate 70-85% cocoa"
Nutritional value per 100 g (3.5 oz)
- Energy: 2,500 kJ (600 kcal)
- Carbohydrates: 45.9 g
- Sugars: 24 g
- Dietary fiber: 10.9 g
- Fat: 42.6 g
- Saturated: 24.5 g
- Trans: 0.03 g
- Monounsaturated: 12.8 g
- Polyunsaturated: 1.26 g
- Protein: 7.79 g
Vitamins and minerals
Vitamins	Quantity %DV^{†}
Vitamin A equiv.	0% 2 μg
Vitamin A	39 IU
Thiamine (B1)	3% 0.034 mg
Riboflavin (B2)	6% 0.078 mg
Niacin (B3)	7% 1.05 mg
Pantothenic acid (B5)	8% 0.418 mg
Vitamin B6	2% 0.038 mg
Vitamin E	4% 0.59 mg
Vitamin K	6% 7.3 μg
Minerals	Quantity %DV^{†}
Calcium	6% 73 mg
Copper	197% 1.77 mg
Iron	66% 11.90 mg
Magnesium	54% 228 mg
Manganese	85% 1.95 mg
Phosphorus	25% 308 mg
Potassium	24% 715 mg
Selenium	12% 6.8 μg
Sodium	1% 20 mg
Zinc	30% 3.31 mg
- Other constituents: Quantity
- Water: 1.37 g
- Caffeine: 80 mg
- Cholesterol: 3 mg
- Theobromine: 802 mg
- Link to USDA Database entry
- ^{†}Percentages estimated using US recommendations for adults, except for potassium, which is estimated based on expert recommendation from the National Academies.

Nutrients in dark chocolate include 46% carbohydrates, 43% fats, 8% protein, and 1% water (table). In a 100-gram (3 1/2-ounce) reference serving, dark chocolate provides 2,500 kilojoules (600 kilocalories) of food energy, and is a rich source (defined as more than 20% of the Daily Value, DV) of several dietary minerals, including copper, iron, magnesium, manganese, phosphorus, potassium, and zinc (table).

=== Research ===
While dark chocolate is popularly considered a health food, only limited high-quality clinical research has been conducted to evaluate the effects of compounds found in cocoa on physiological outcomes, such as blood pressure, for which only small (1–2 mmHg) changes resulted from short-term, high consumption of chocolate up to 105 grams and 670 milligrams of flavonols per day. A recent 2024 study though, showed that those who consumed more than five servings a week of dark chocolate had about 20% lower risk of developing type 2 diabetes.

Flavanols found in dark chocolate include the monomers catechin and epicatechin, and (to a lesser extent) the polymeric procyanidins, which remain under laboratory research. Flavanols break down as cocoa beans are fermented, roasted and treated with the Dutch process. To consume enough cocoa flavanols for the presumed effects claimed in some limited studies requires eating at least around 4.75 ounces (135 g) of dark chocolate a day, which also involves intake of significant amounts of sugar and saturated fats. The chocolate industry, and in particular Mars, Inc., has funded research to promote chocolate as a health food. As of 2018, Mars had funded more than 150 studies into cocoa flavanols since the 1980s. That year, they said they would no longer try to imply chocolate is a health food.

A 2021 systematic review of the health effects of chocolate and cocoa found high-quality research had still not been performed to evaluate physiological outcomes. The only health effects observed were improvements in lipid profiles; control subjects showed no significant differences in terms of skin, cardiovascular, anthropometric, cognitive and quality of life outcomes.

=== Metal content ===
Chocolate, particularly dark chocolate, may contain appreciable levels of toxic heavy metals, such as cadmium, which may be present naturally in the soil of cocoa plantations, particularly in Latin America. For products containing over 50% cocoa, the European Commission has set a limit for cadmium of 0.8 mg/kg, while for chocolate containing between 30%–50% cocoa, the limit is 0.3 mg/kg. After these limits came into enforcement in 2019, similar regulations were enforced in other jurisdictions across the world. The state of California recommends a maximum daily intake of 4.1 micrograms of cadmium.

A 2024 report analyzing dark chocolate and cocoa samples in the United States from 2014 to 2022 found that multiple samples exceeded Prop 65 levels for heavy metals: 43% of samples exceeding levels for lead, and 35% exceeding levels for cadmium. However, a 2024 study published in Food Research International found that high metal content in dark chocolate may pose health concerns mainly only for children.

== Manufacturing ==
=== Ingredients ===
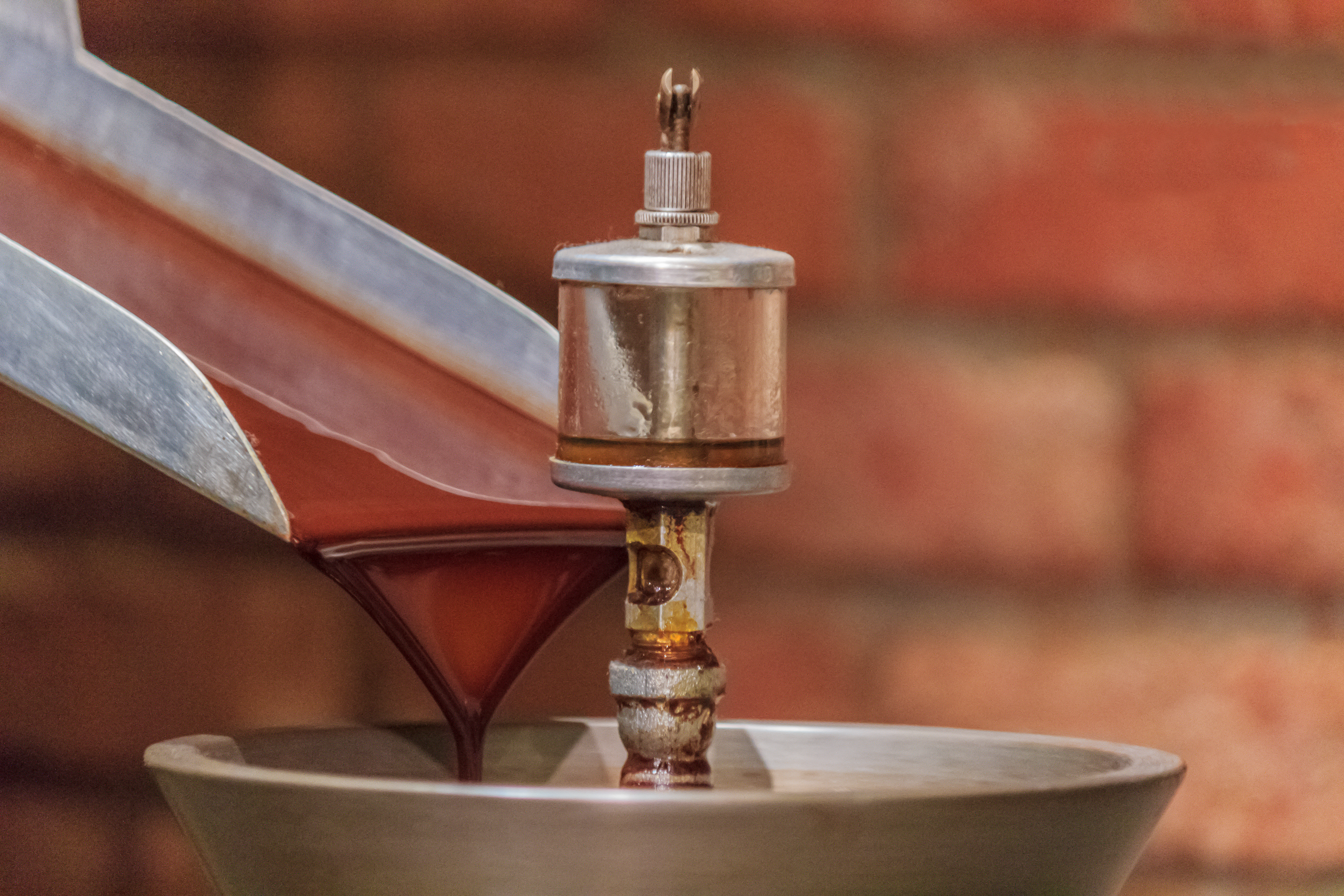
Chocolate liquor, shown here flowing from a chocolate mill, is the key ingredient in dark chocolate.

Dark chocolate is mainly a combination of chocolate liquor, cocoa butter and sugar. Milk fats are often added to dark chocolate to delay the formation of chocolate bloom; dark chocolate containing 1–2% milk fat experiences a delay in blooming. Milk fats are also added by some manufacturers to slightly soften dark chocolate and allow for more flavor to be released. During the final step of standardizing, emulsifiers such as lecithin or PGPR are added to improve texture. Some manufacturers add vanilla or vanillin as a flavoring.

Basic dark chocolate (or baking chocolate) can be made using only chocolate liquor, sugar and lecithin, whereas higher-quality sweet dark chocolate typically contains additional cocoa butter to improve fluidity and melting properties. In the context of craft chocolate making, chocolate can also be made using only chocolate liquor and sugar, but with a lower proportion of sugar than in conventional sweet dark chocolate to maintain fluidity; this is referred to as "two-ingredient chocolate". Unsweetened dark chocolate can consist solely of chocolate liquor, although some jurisdictions (Europe for instance) require chocolate to contain a minimum amount of sugar.

Many dark chocolate products sold label the cocoa percentage. This percentage refers to the percent of the chocolate that is chocolate liquor and cocoa butter, with almost all of the rest being sugar. As what part is chocolate liquor and what part is cocoa butter is not identified, chocolates with an identical cocoa percentage can have vastly different compositions and characteristics. Chocolates containing more chocolate liquor are more intensely flavored and more viscous. Variability in the quality of cocoa beans mean chocolates with lower cocoa percentages can have more desirable flavors than those with higher percentages.

=== Process ===
The basic process of making dark chocolate involves mixing, refining, conching and standardizing. With its relatively low viscosity, dark chocolate is the easiest chocolate to handle in manufacturing. In the mixing stage, chocolate liquor is combined in a melanger with sugar and some cocoa butter, mixing until a paste is formed. As long as the chocolate liquor has been correctly milled, the refining process for dark chocolate is primarily about grinding down sugar. Refining involves putting chocolate through a refiner machine, which carries the chocolate paste through large steel rollers set to varying widths, enveloping them in fat until the chocolate particles are as small as is desired, and the chocolate paste is a fine powder. Refining dark chocolate to be finer makes the cocoa flavor more intense, and the ideal particle size for dark chocolate has been identified as 35 μm. Dark chocolates with a higher chocolate liquor content require special accommodations here, as, with high portions of cocoa butter, there can be issues with the roller refining process. These accommodations can involve beginning the refining process with less chocolate liquor, and only integrating the rest during the conching stage. Other alternatives include using cocoa powder or processing in a ball mill.

Conching machines mix and knead chocolate liquor, changing the flavor and texture. More than for other types of chocolate, conching dark chocolate serves to remove undesirable flavors. Dark chocolate is conched at higher temperatures than other chocolates, between 158–180 °F (70–82 °C). If dark chocolate takes on moisture during the conching process, for example by being conched in the same room as milk chocolate with neither enclosed, the dark chocolate can become undesirably thick and develop unpleasant flavors. During the final step of standardizing, emulsifiers and sometimes vanilla flavorings are added. If needed to reach a desired yield or viscosity, more cocoa butter can be added before the mixture undergoes laboratory testing for particle size and food safety. If these standards are met, it is pumped through fine screens to remove any agglomerates. Tempering is performed at different temperatures than for milk chocolate because of how milk fats impact the formation of crystal lattices.

=== Legal requirements ===
According to a 2000 European Union directive, dark chocolate must contain at minimum 18% cocoa butter, not less than 35% total dry cocoa solids and a minimum of 14% dry non-fat cocoa solids. The U.S. Food and Drug Administration (FDA) regulates the naming and ingredients of cocoa products. U.S. regulations do not specify a label of "dark chocolate", but require "sweet chocolate" to contain a minimum of 15% chocolate liqueur, while semi-sweet and bittersweet chocolates must be at least 35% chocolate liquor.

In some countries, such as France, the term "dark" is reserved for chocolate containing at least 43% cocoa, of which at least 26% must be cocoa butter. Chocolate containing less than 43% cocoa is typically regarded as chocolate for baking rather than eating.

== Uses ==
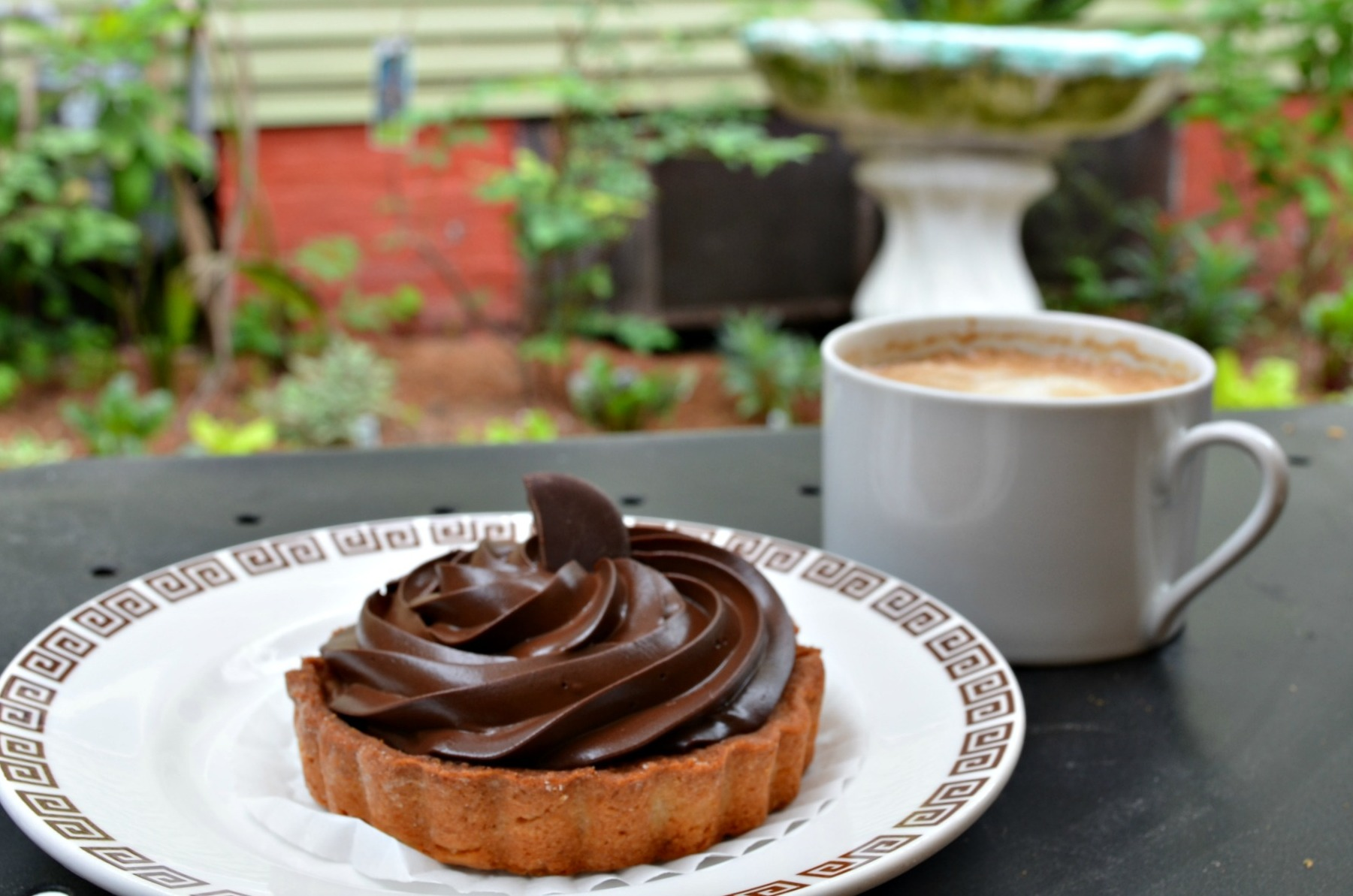
A chocolate ganache tart

Dark chocolate is used prominently in some regional dishes, including coating the Italian Mustacciuoli and Danish Sarah Bernhardt cake, fusing biscuits in the Italian Baci di dama, and grated atop the German Black Forest gateau. Dark chocolate is used to produce some chocolate sauces.

Ganache is a fat-and-water emulsion traditionally made with dark chocolate and cream. It is used in chocolate making, particularly for truffles, as well as in a wide range of confectionery products. It is believed to have been invented in France in the 1850s.

== Market ==
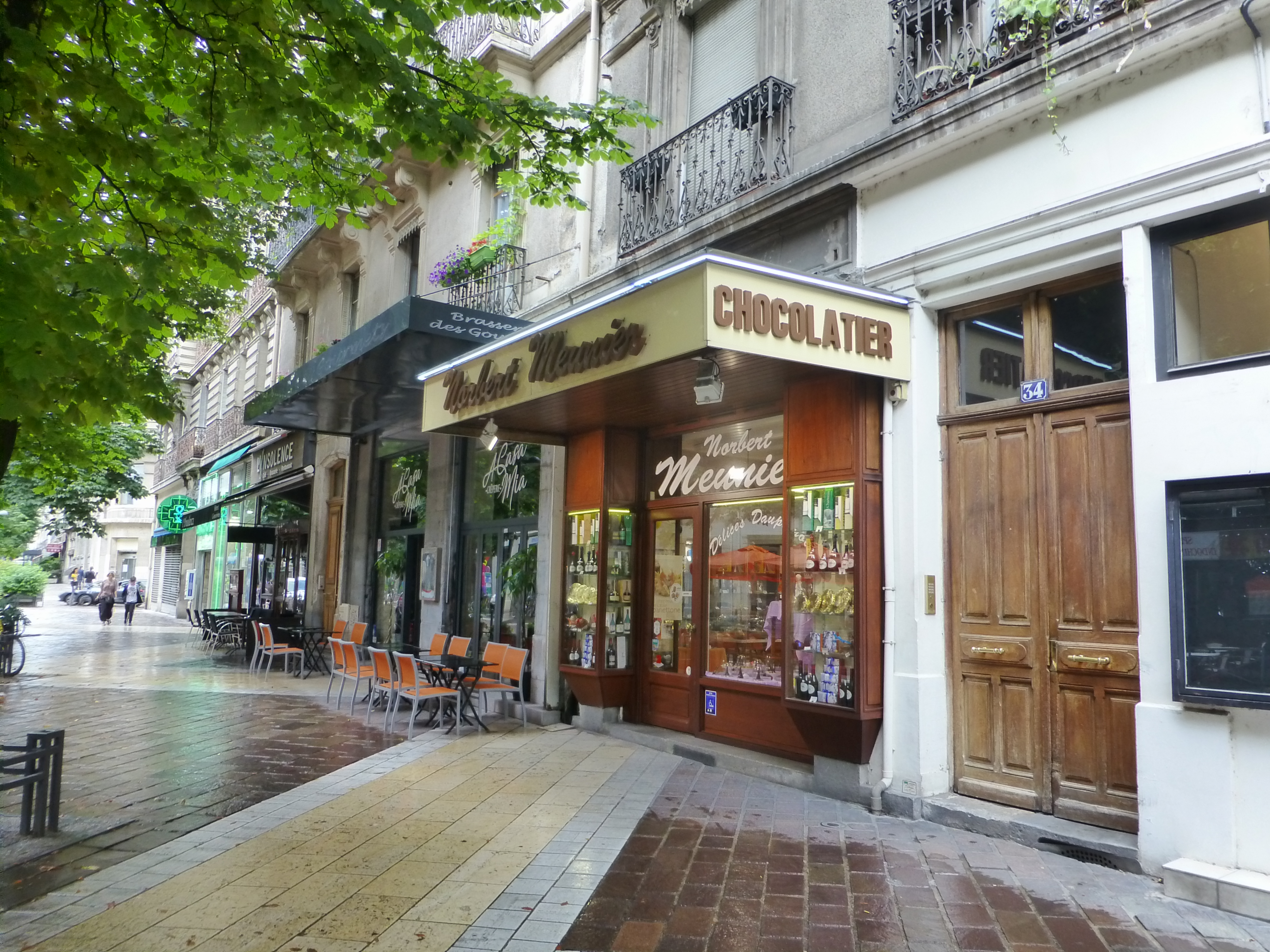
Chocolatier in France; France is considered the "home of dark chocolate"

During the 2010s, demand for high-cocoa dark chocolate increased in light of research linking the antioxidant content with a reduced risk of cancer and cardiovascular health. As of 2019, demand for dark chocolate containing more than 70% cocoa, particularly using beans from a single-source, was increasing.

France is considered the "home of dark chocolate", and the industry there uses the term Grand Cru to refer to particularly valued chocolates. As of 2018, retailers and dark chocolate manufacturers there received an equal portion of over two thirds of the margins generated across the cocoa supply chain for dark chocolate tablets. As of 2016, the dark chocolate market was concentrated more in Continental Europe than the United States and England. 31% of chocolate produced was dark chocolate. From 2005 to 2011, dark chocolate consumption in the US increased by 9% per annum. Beyond beliefs around the healthiness of dark chocolate, increased demand for dark chocolate in the United States has also been attributed to a trend of consumers expanding preferences beyond traditional mass-produced chocolate. In the US, this growth has occurred at the expense of milk chocolate. In Germany, the growth in popularity of dark chocolate, competing with the traditional preference for milky chocolates has been attributed to "foodies". Outside of the West, the growth in popularity of dark chocolate has been observed in Japan.

A large percentage of chocolates sold by the Swiss chocolate maker Lindt are dark chocolate of varying total cocoa solid percentages, including 70%, 85% and 90%. Among other forms, dark chocolates are sold as bars and bonbons.

== Variants ==
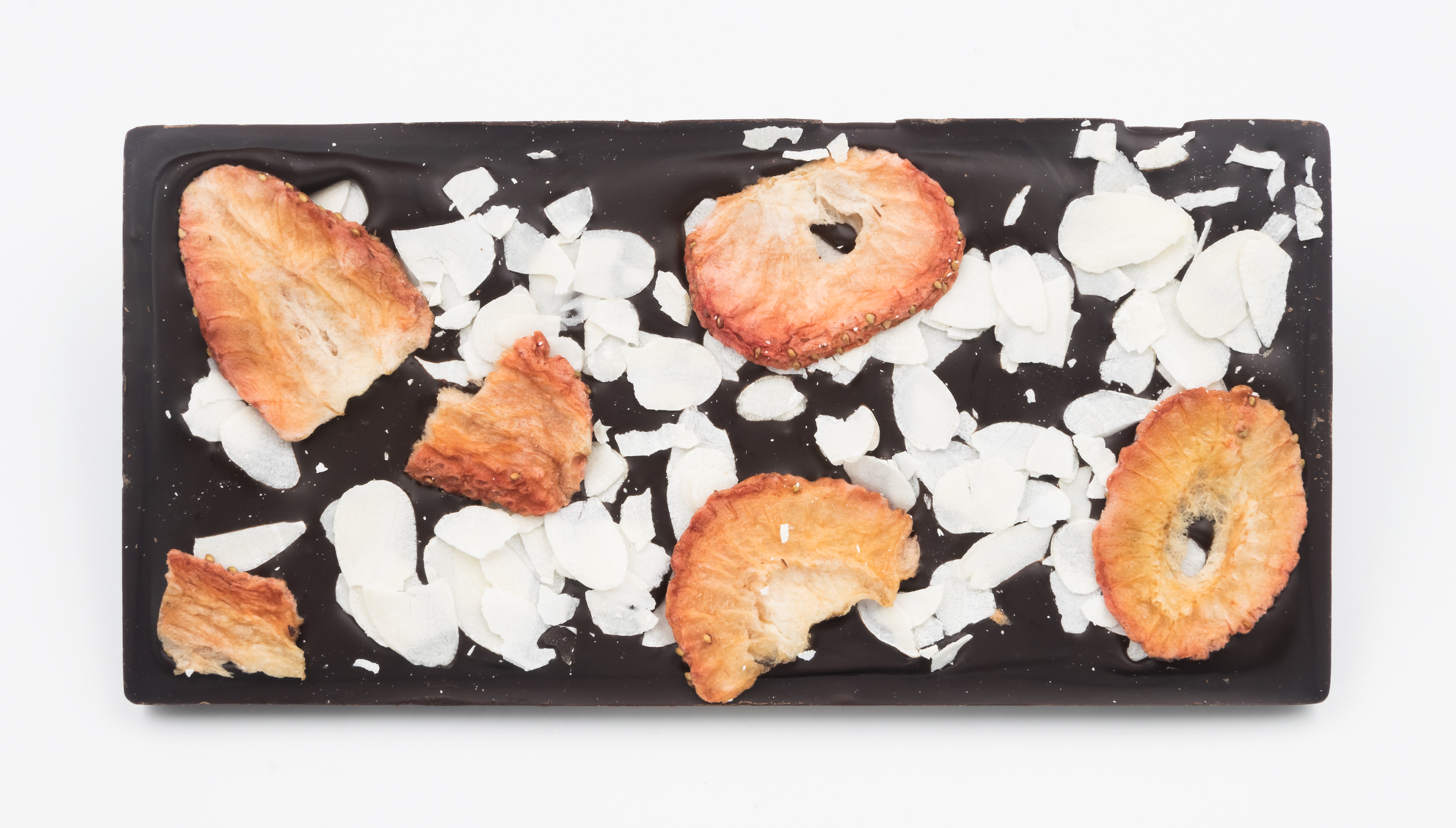
Hand-made gourmet dark chocolate

Low-sugar dark chocolate is made by replacing sugar with maltitol, a sugar alcohol, which may be replaced with a fiber blend and stevia. Nuts, cereals, creams, liqueurs and syrups can be added. Dark chocolates range in the percentage of total cocoa solids they contain, from products being called dark chocolate with percentages from 40% to 100%.

Flavor cocoas, cocoas purchased for a premium that are valued for their flavor or other qualities are mostly used for dark chocolate. These include single source chocolates. Single source dark chocolates are often from countries such as Ecuador and Venezuela. Fruity, astringent and acidic flavors are highlighted in these chocolates, while flavors of smoke and mold flavors are avoided as they cannot be removed by further processing.

== See also ==
- Chocolate in savory cooking
- Fair trade cocoa
- Raw chocolate

== Sources ==
=== Books ===
- Afoakwa, Emmanuel Ohene (8 April 2016). Chocolate Science and Technology. Wiley. ISBN 978-1-118-91378-9.
- Alberts, Heike C; Cidell, Julie (2016). "Chocolate Consumption, Manufacturing, and Quality in Europe and North America". In Squicciarini, Mara P; Swinnen, Johan (eds.). The Economics of Chocolate. Oxford University Press. ISBN 978-0-19-179326-4.
- Ayto, John (2012). The Diner's Dictionary (2nd ed.). Oxford University Press. ISBN 978-0-19-964024-9.
- Bau, Frédéric (2008). Chocolate Fusion: Chocolate in Cuisine (2nd English ed.). Montagud Editores. ISBN 978-84-7212-117-1.
- Beckett, Stephen T (2019). The Science of Chocolate (3rd ed.). Croydon, United Kingdom: Royal Society of Chemistry. ISBN 978-1-78801-235-5.
- Beckett, Stephen T; Paggios, Konstantinos; Roberts, Ian (2017). "Conching". In Beckett, Stephen T; Fowler, Mark S; Ziegler, Gregory R (eds.). Beckett's Industrial Chocolate Manufacture and Use (5th ed.). West Sussex, UK: Wiley. ISBN 978-1-118-78014-5.
- Coe, Sophie D.; Coe, Michael D. (2013). The True History of Chocolate (3rd ed.). London: Thames & Hudson. ISBN 978-0-500-77093-1. OCLC 1085907808.
- Collins, Ross F. (2022). Chocolate: A Cultural Encyclopedia. Santa Barbara, California: ABC-Clio. ISBN 978-1-4408-7607-3.
- di Schino, June (2015). "Biscotti". In Goldstein, Darra (ed.). The Oxford Companion to Sugar and Sweets. Oxford University Press. ISBN 978-0-19-931339-6.
- Fitzgerald, Robert (1995). Rowntree and the marketing revolution, 1862-1969. Cambridge University Press. ISBN 0-521-43512-9.
- Fowler, Mark S; Coutel, Fabien (2017). "Cocoa beans: from tree to factory". In Beckett, Stephen T; Fowler, Mark S; Ziegler, Gregory R (eds.). Beckett's Industrial Chocolate Manufacture and Use (5th ed.). West Sussex, UK: Wiley. ISBN 978-1-118-78014-5.
- Gordon, Bertram M. (2008). "Commerce, Colonies, and Cacao". In Grivetti, Louis Evan; Shapiro, Howard-Yana (eds.). Chocolate: History, Culture, and Heritage. New Jersey: John Wiley & Sons, Inc. ISBN 978-0-470-41131-5.
- Greweling, Peter P (2013). Chocolates & Confections: Formula, Theory, and Technique for the Artisan Confectioner (2nd ed.). Hoboken, New Jersey: John Wiley & Sons. ISBN 978-0-470-42441-4.
- Hackenesch, Silke (2017). Chocolate and Blackness: A Cultural History. University of Chicago Press. ISBN 978-3-593-50776-7.
- Hahnemann, Trine (2015). "Scandinavia". In Goldstein, Darra (ed.). The Oxford Companion to Sugar and Sweets. Oxford University Press. ISBN 978-0-19-931339-6.
- Hartel, Richard W; von Elbe, Joachim H; Hofberger, Randy (2018). Confectionery Science and Technology. Cham, Switzerland: Springer Publishing. doi:10.1007/978-3-319-61742-8. ISBN 978-3-319-61742-8.
- Heinzelmann, Ursula (2015a). "Black Forest cake". In Goldstein, Darra (ed.). The Oxford Companion to Sugar and Sweets. Oxford University Press. ISBN 978-0-19-931339-6.
- Heinzelmann, Ursula (2015b). "Germany". In Goldstein, Darra (ed.). The Oxford Companion to Sugar and Sweets. Oxford University Press. ISBN 978-0-19-931339-6.
- Kamphuis, Henri J; Fowler, Mark S (2017). "Production of cocoa mass, cocoa butter and cocoa powder". In Beckett, Stephen T; Fowler, Mark S; Ziegler, Gregory R (eds.). Beckett's Industrial Chocolate Manufacture and Use (5th ed.). West Sussex, UK: Wiley. ISBN 978-1-118-78014-5.
- Leaf, Alexandra (2015). "Chocolate, post-Columbian". In Goldstein, Darra; Mintz, Sidney; Krondl, Michael; Rath, Eric; Mason, Laura; Quinzio, Geraldine; Heinzelmann, Ursula (eds.). The Oxford Companion to Sugar and Sweets. Oxford University Press. ISBN 978-0-19-931339-6.
- Leissle, Kristy (2018). Cocoa. Polity. ISBN 978-1-5095-1320-8. OCLC 988580966.
- Levitan, Carmel A (2015). "Vision". In Goldstein, Darra (ed.). The Oxford Companion to Sugar and Sweets. Oxford University Press. ISBN 978-0-19-931339-6.
- Marsh, Shona; Rummel, Florian (2024). "Rheometry and Rheological Characterisation". In Rosenthal, Andrew J; Chen, Jianshe (eds.). Food Texturology: Measurement and Perception of Food Textural Properties (2nd ed.). Cham, Switzerland: Springer Publishing. ISBN 978-3-031-41900-3.
- Mason, Laura (2014). "Chocolate: Chocolate in the 19th and 20th centuries". In Davidson, Alan; Jaine, Tom (eds.). The Oxford Companion to Food (3rd ed.). Oxford University Press. ISBN 978-0-19-967733-7.
- Nestle, Marion (2018). Unsavory Truth: How Food Companies Skew the Science of What We Eat. New York: Basic Books. ISBN 978-1-5416-1731-5.
- Presilla, Maricel E. (2001). The New Taste of Chocolate, Revised: A Cultural and Natural History of Cacao with Recipes. New York: Ten Speed Press. ISBN 978-1-58008-950-0.
- Presilla, Maricel E (2015). "Chocolate, single origin". In Goldstein, Darra; Mintz, Sidney; Krondl, Michael; Rath, Eric; Mason, Laura; Quinzio, Geraldine; Heinzelmann, Ursula (eds.). The Oxford Companion to Sugar and Sweets. Oxford University Press. ISBN 978-0-19-931339-6.
- Rath, Eric C (2015). "Japan". In Goldstein, Darra (ed.). The Oxford Companion to Sugar and Sweets. Oxford University Press. ISBN 978-0-19-931339-6.
- Robertson, Emma (2009). Chocolate, Women and Empire: A Social and Cultural History. Studies in Imperialism. Manchester University Press. ISBN 978-0-7190-9005-9.
- Sampeck, Kathryn E; Thayn, Jonathan (2017). "Translating Tastes: A Cartography of Chocolate Colonialism". In Schwartzkopf, Stacey; Sampeck, Kathryn E (eds.). Substance and Seduction: Ingested Commodities in Early Modern Mesoamerica. University of Texas Press. doi:10.7560/313862-006. ISBN 978-1-4773-1388-6.
- Segan, Francine (2015). "Italy". In Goldstein, Darra (ed.). The Oxford Companion to Sugar and Sweets. Oxford University Press. ISBN 978-0-19-931339-6.
- Skytte, Ulla P; Kaylegian, Kerry E (2017). "Ingredients from milk". In Beckett, Stephen T; Fowler, Mark S; Ziegler, Gregory R (eds.). Beckett's Industrial Chocolate Manufacture and Use (5th ed.). West Sussex, UK: Wiley. ISBN 978-1-118-78014-5.
- Snyder; Olsen, Bradley Foliart; Brindle, Laura Pallas (2008). "From Stone Metates to Steel Mills: The Evolution of Chocolate Manufacturing". In Grivetti, Louis Evan; Shapiro, Howard-Yana (eds.). Chocolate: History, Culture, and Heritage. New Jersey: John Wiley & Sons, Inc. ISBN 978-0-470-41131-5.
- Stauffer, Marlene B (2017). "Quality control and shelf life". In Beckett, Stephen T; Fowler, Mark S; Ziegler, Gregory R (eds.). Beckett's Industrial Chocolate Manufacture and Use (5th ed.). West Sussex, UK: Wiley. ISBN 978-1-118-78014-5.
- Telly, Charles S (1997). "Chocolate—Its Quality and Flavor (Which Is the World's Best Chocolate?)". Chocolate: Food of the Gods. Westport, Connecticut: Greenwood Publishing Group. ISBN 978-0-313-30506-1.
- Terrio, Susan J (2000). Crafting the Culture and History of French Chocolate. University of California Press. ISBN 0-520-22125-7.
- Terrio, Susan (2016). "Visions of Excess: Crafting and Consuming Good Chocolate in France and the United States". In Wilkinson-Weber, Clare M; DeNicola, Alicia Ory (eds.). Critical Craft: Technology, Globalization, and Capitalism. London and New York: Routledge. ISBN 978-1-4725-9485-3.
- Terrio, Susan (28 August 2014). "French Chocolate as Intangible Cultural Heritage". In Brulotte, Ronda L; Di Giovine, Michael A (eds.). Edible Identities: Food As Cultural Heritage. New York: Routledge. ISBN 978-1-4094-4263-9.
- Thomas, Jonathan (2017). "The global chocolate confectionery market". In Beckett, Stephen T; Fowler, Mark S; Ziegler, Gregory R (eds.). Beckett's Industrial Chocolate Manufacture and Use (5th ed.). West Sussex, UK: Wiley. ISBN 978-1-118-78014-5.
- Wemischner, Robert (2015). "Sauce". In Goldstein, Darra (ed.). The Oxford Companion to Sugar and Sweets. Oxford University Press. ISBN 978-0-19-931339-6.
- Wilson, Philip K; Hurst, W Jeffrey (2012). Chocolate as Medicine: A Quest over the Centuries. Cambridge: Royal Society of Chemistry. ISBN 978-1-84973-411-0.
- Wohlmuth, Edward G (2017). "Recipes". In Beckett, Stephen T; Fowler, Mark S; Ziegler, Gregory R (eds.). Beckett's Industrial Chocolate Manufacture and Use (5th ed.). West Sussex, UK: Wiley. ISBN 978-1-118-78014-5.
- Ziegler, Gottfried (2017). "Flavour development in cocoa and chocolate". In Beckett, Stephen T; Fowler, Mark S; Ziegler, Gregory R (eds.). Beckett's Industrial Chocolate Manufacture and Use (5th ed.). West Sussex, UK: Wiley. ISBN 978-1-118-78014-5.
- Ziegler, Gottfried; Hogg, Richard (2017). "Particle size reduction". In Beckett, Stephen T; Fowler, Mark S; Ziegler, Gregory R (eds.). Beckett's Industrial Chocolate Manufacture and Use (5th ed.). West Sussex, UK: Wiley. ISBN 978-1-118-78014-5.

=== Journal articles and reports ===
- Comparative study on the distribution of value in European chocolate chains (Report). Paris: Food and Agriculture Organization of the United Nations (FAO) and Bureau d'analyse sociétale pour une information citoyenne (BASIC). 2024. Archived from the original on 2 September 2024.
- Dillinger, Teresa L.; Barriga, Patricia; Escárcega, Sylvia; Jimenez, Martha; Lowe, Diana Salazar; Grivetti, Louis E. (1 August 2000). "Food of the Gods: Cure for Humanity? A Cultural History of the Medicinal and Ritual Use of Chocolate". The Journal of Nutrition. 130 (8): 2057S–2072S. doi:10.1093/jn/130.8.2057S. ISSN 0022-3166. PMID 10917925.
- Graziano, Martha Makra (1998). "Food of the Gods as Mortals' Medicine: The Uses of Chocolate and Cacao Products". Pharmacy in History. 40 (4). JSTOR 24319003.
- Gutiérrez, Tomy J (November 2017). "State-of-the-Art Chocolate Manufacture: A Review". Comprehensive Reviews in Food Science and Food Safety. 16 (6): 1313–1344. doi:10.1111/1541-4337.12301. hdl:11336/32798. PMID 33371587.
- Hands, Jacob M; Anderson, Mark L; Cooperman, Tod; Balsky, Jared E; Frame, Leigh A (31 July 2024). "A multi-year heavy metal analysis of 72 dark chocolate and cocoa products in the USA". Frontiers in Nutrition. 11 1366231. doi:10.3389/fnut.2024.1366231. PMC 11321977. PMID 39144282.
- James, Cyan (5 October 2018). "Junk food, junk science?". Science. 362 (6410): 38. Bibcode:2018Sci...362...38J. doi:10.1126/science.aau6602.
- Lanaud, Claire; Vignes, Hélène; Utge, José; Valette, Gilles; Rhoné, Bénédicte; Garcia Caputi, Mariella; Angarita Nieto, Natalia Sofía; Fouet, Olivier; Gaikwad, Nilesh; Zarrillo, Sonia; Powis, Terry G.; Cyphers, Ann; Valdez, Francisco; Olivera Nunez, S. Quirino; Speller, Camilla (7 March 2024). "A revisited history of cacao domestication in pre-Columbian times revealed by archaeogenomic approaches". Scientific Reports. 14 (1): 2972. Bibcode:2024NatSR..14.2972L. doi:10.1038/s41598-024-53010-6. ISSN 2045-2322. PMC 10920634. PMID 38453955.
- Martin, Carla D; Sampeck, Kathryn E (2015). "The bitter and sweet of chocolate in Europe". Socio.hu Social Science Review. 5 (SI3): 37–60. doi:10.18030/socio.hu.2015en.37. eISSN 2063-0468.
- McShea, Andrew; Ramiro-Puig, Emma; Munro, Sandra B; Casadesus, Gemma; Castell, Margarida; Smith, Mark A (1 November 2008). "Clinical benefit and preservation of flavonols in dark chocolate manufacturing". Nutrition Reviews. 66 (11): 630–641. doi:10.1111/j.1753-4887.2008.00114.x. PMID 19019025.
- Powis, Terry G; Hurst, W Jeffrey; del Carmen Rodríguez, María; Ponciano, Ortíz C; Blake, Michael; Cheetham, David; Coe, Michael D; Hodgson, John G (April 2008). "The Origins of Cacao Use in Mesoamerica". Mexicon. 30 (2): 35–38. JSTOR 23759545.
- Ried, K.; Sullivan, T. R.; Fakler, P.; Frank, O. R.; Stocks, N. P. (25 April 2017). "Effect of cocoa on blood pressure". The Cochrane Database of Systematic Reviews. 4 (4) CD008893. doi:10.1002/14651858.CD008893.pub3. PMC 6478304. PMID 28439881.
- Schifferstein, Hendrik N.J.; Kudrowitz, Barry M; Breuer, Carola (2022). "Food Perception and Aesthetics - Linking Sensory Science to Culinary Practice". Journal of Culinary Science & Technology. 20 (4): 293–335. doi:10.1080/15428052.2020.1824833.
- Tan, Terence Yew Chin; Lim, Xin Yi; Yeo, Julie Hsiao Hui; Lee, Shaun Wen Huey; Lai, Nai Ming (24 August 2021). "The Health Effects of Chocolate and Cocoa: A Systematic Review". Nutrients. 13 (9): 2909. doi:10.3390/nu13092909. PMC 8470865. PMID 34578786.
- Vanderschueren, Ruth; Argüello, David; Blommaert, Hester; Montalvo, Daniela; Barraza, Fiorella; Maurice, Laurence; Schreck, Eva; Schulin, Rainer; Lewis, Caleb; Vazquez, José Luis; Umaharan, Pathmanathan; Chavez, Eduardo; Sarret, Geraldine; Smolders, Erik (2021). "Mitigating the level of cadmium in cacao products: Reviewing the transfer of cadmium from soil to chocolate bar". Science of the Total Environment. 781 146779. Bibcode:2021ScTEn.78146779V. doi:10.1016/j.scitotenv.2021.146779.
