= Cocoa bean fermentation =

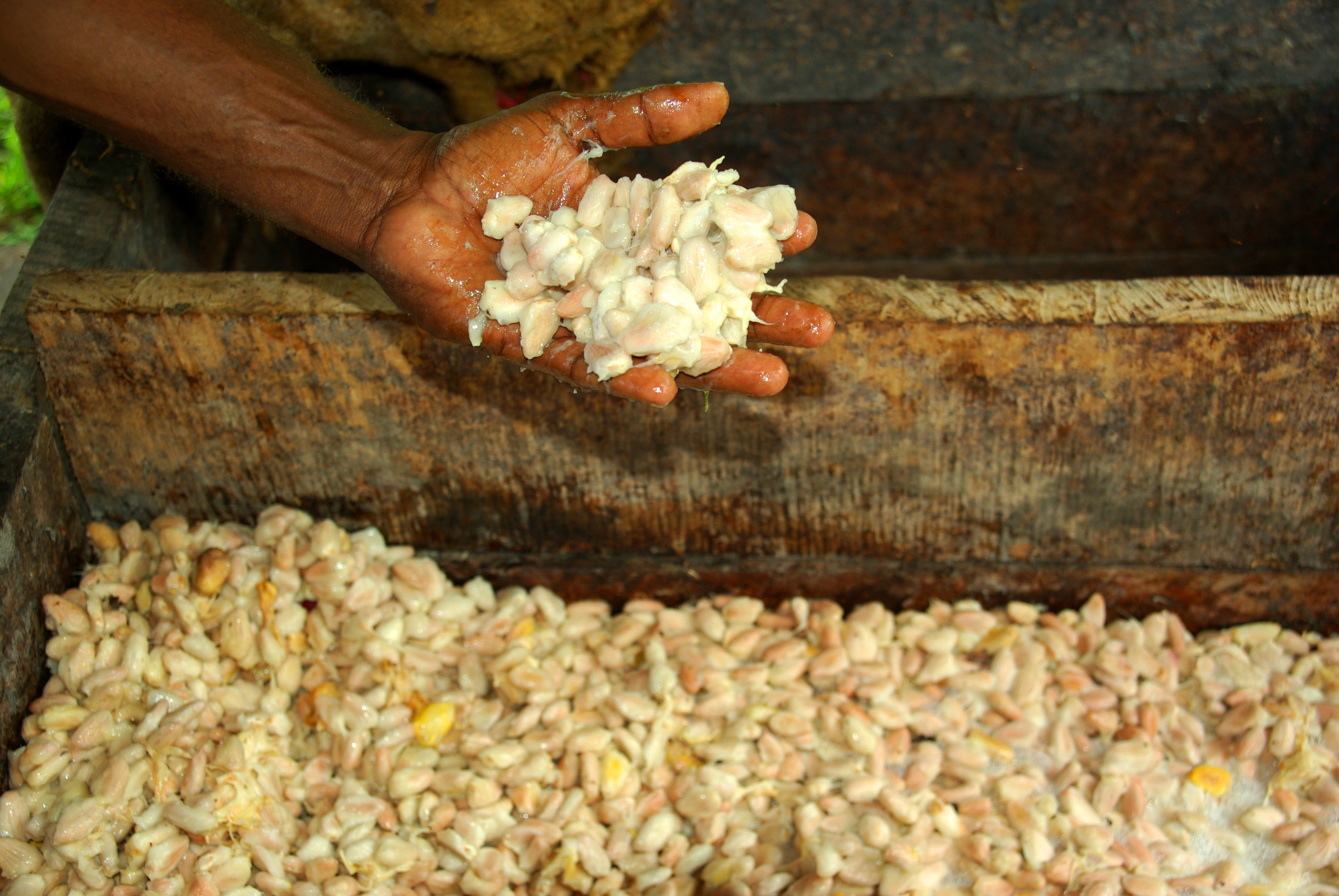
Fermenting cocoa beans

Fermentation is an important step in processing cocoa beans to make chocolate.

In fermentation, beans that have been removed from their pods are put together in close proximity. Yeasts, lactic acid bacteria and acetic acid bacteria break down pulp surrounding the beans and develop flavor precursors within the bean that create chocolate flavors during roasting. The process also reduces bitterness and gives beans a more brown hue.

Fermentation is divided between on-farm and centralized processing, with the former more common in West Africa and the latter more common in the Americas and parts of the Asia Pacific. In on-farm processing, which is how most fermentation has historically been undertaken, farmers wrap beans in leaves for around five days or move them between wooden boxes daily. In some countries such as Indonesia, cocoa beans undergo minimal fermentation and are sold as bulk filler.

== Process ==
=== Background ===
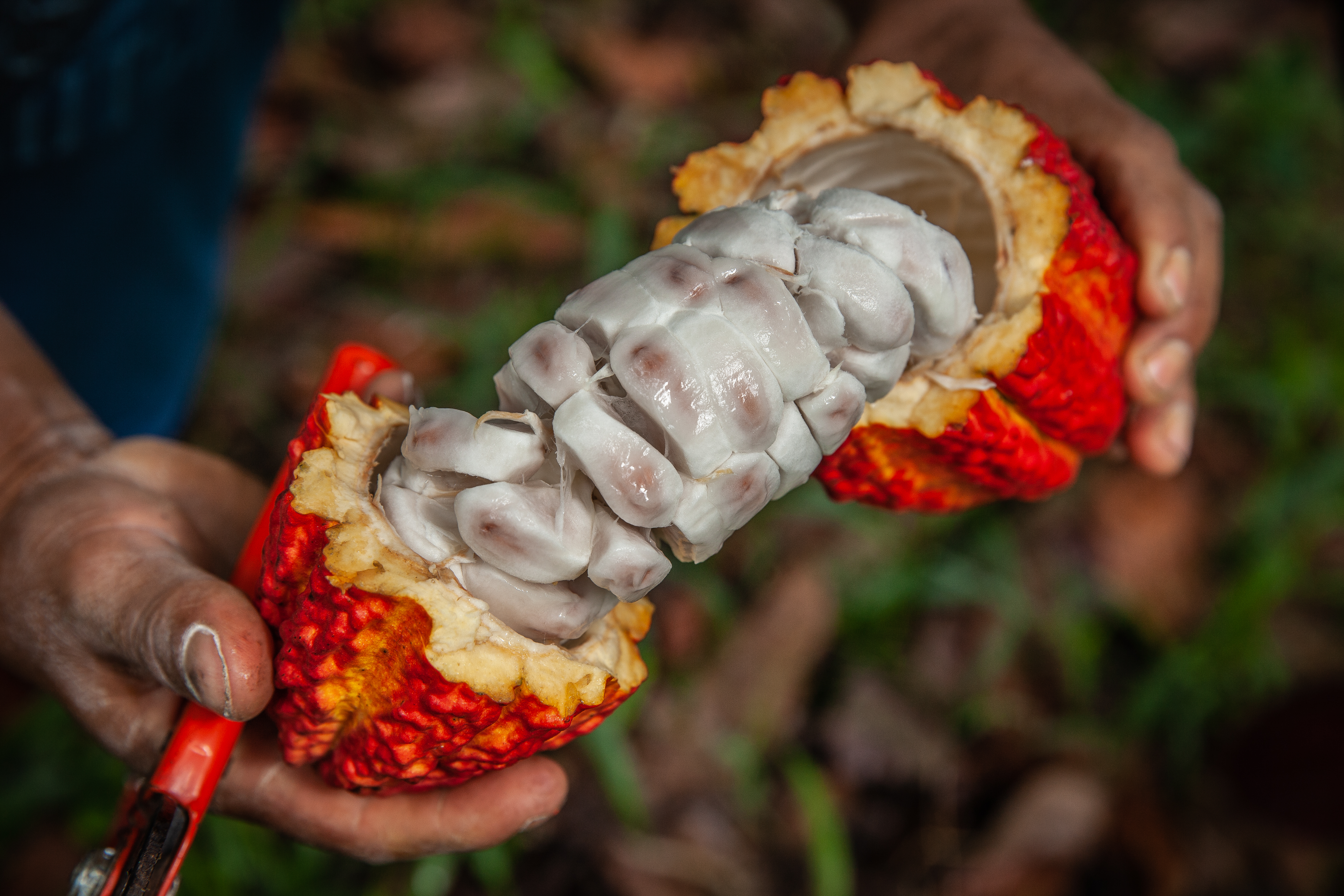
Cocoa beans within a pod

Theobroma cacao is a small tree which grows within 20° of each side of the equator. Its fruits, cocoa pods, grow along its trunk and thicker branches, and are cut down with knives and machetes when ripe. These pods are cut or cracked open using knives or clubs, revealing 30–45 oval beans (the seed of the plant) covered in a white pulp. These beans are removed by hand, and they are detached from the placenta.

=== Procedure ===
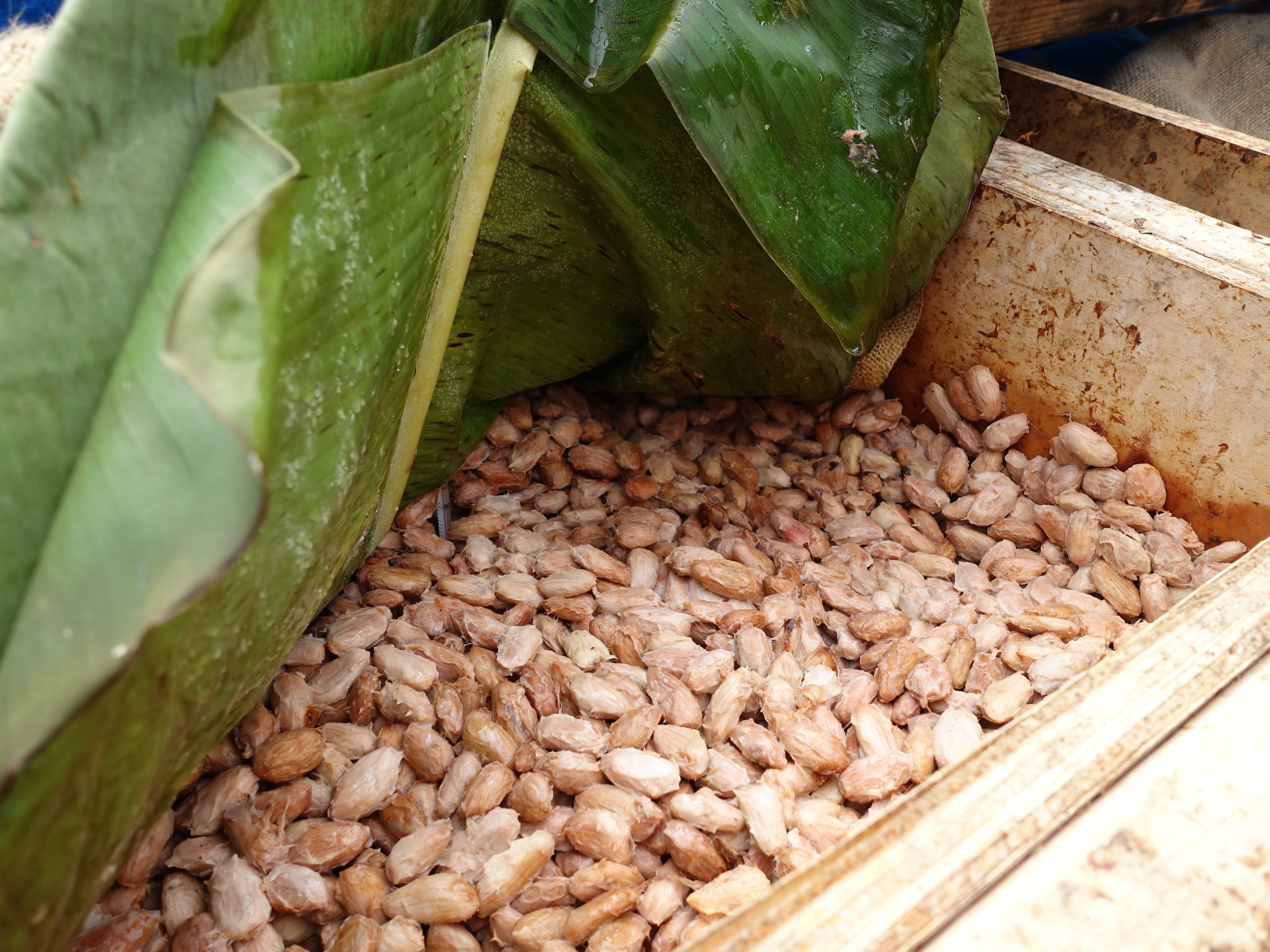
Box fermentation of cocoa beans, covered by banana leaves.

In the fermentation process, mature cocoa beans are stored close together. As they ferment, yeast and bacteria in the pulp multiply and break down sugars and mucilage. Broken down, much of the pulp liquifies, draining away.

How beans are stored together depends on where in the world the beans are being fermented. Smallholders, such as those who dominate production in West Africa, generally store beans in piles weighting up to 25–2,500 kilograms (55–5,512 lb), which are then covered by banana leaves. The leaves' waxiness retains the heat generated by the ferment. Smallholders in Southeast Asia, the Americas and some of West Africa also ferment beans in buckets and baskets.

In plantations and large fermentaries, most fermentation is undertaken in large wooden boxes which hold 1,000–2,000 kilograms (2,200–4,400 lb) of cocoa beans. Some of these are outfitted with openings to permit airflow and to allow the pulp to drain. During a typical ferment, beans are moved daily between boxes to facilitate airflow and standardise output. This practice of agitating beans during a ferment occurs to a lesser extent, and with less frequency, among beans being fermented in piles. While ferments generally take around five days, the end point for smallholders is ultimately determined by their experience. Plantations are more likely to ferment for longer than five days, with some extending the process to six or seven days. In determining how long to ferment, producers try to avoid overfermention, which causes beans to take on a "hammy" off-flavor. The level of fermentation is assessed using a generally subjective and unreliable method called the "cut test", wherein a set of beans are bifurcated and quantities of different colors are counted.

=== Microbiology ===
Cocoa beans in increasing stages of fermentation
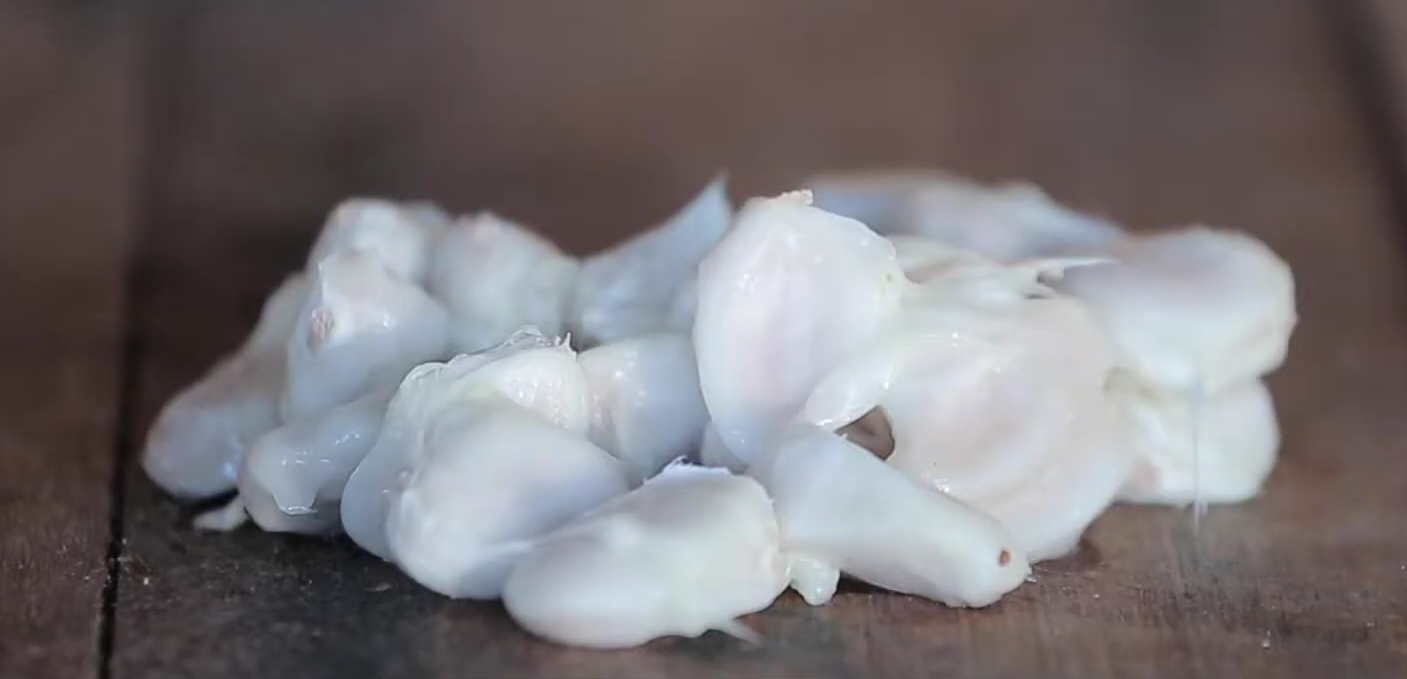
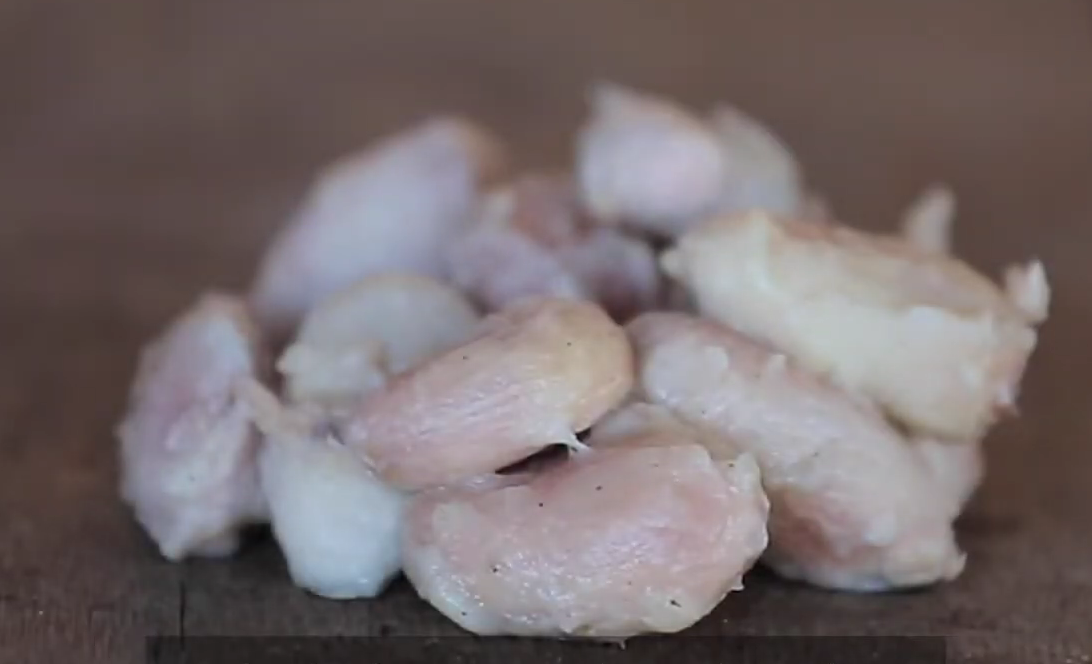
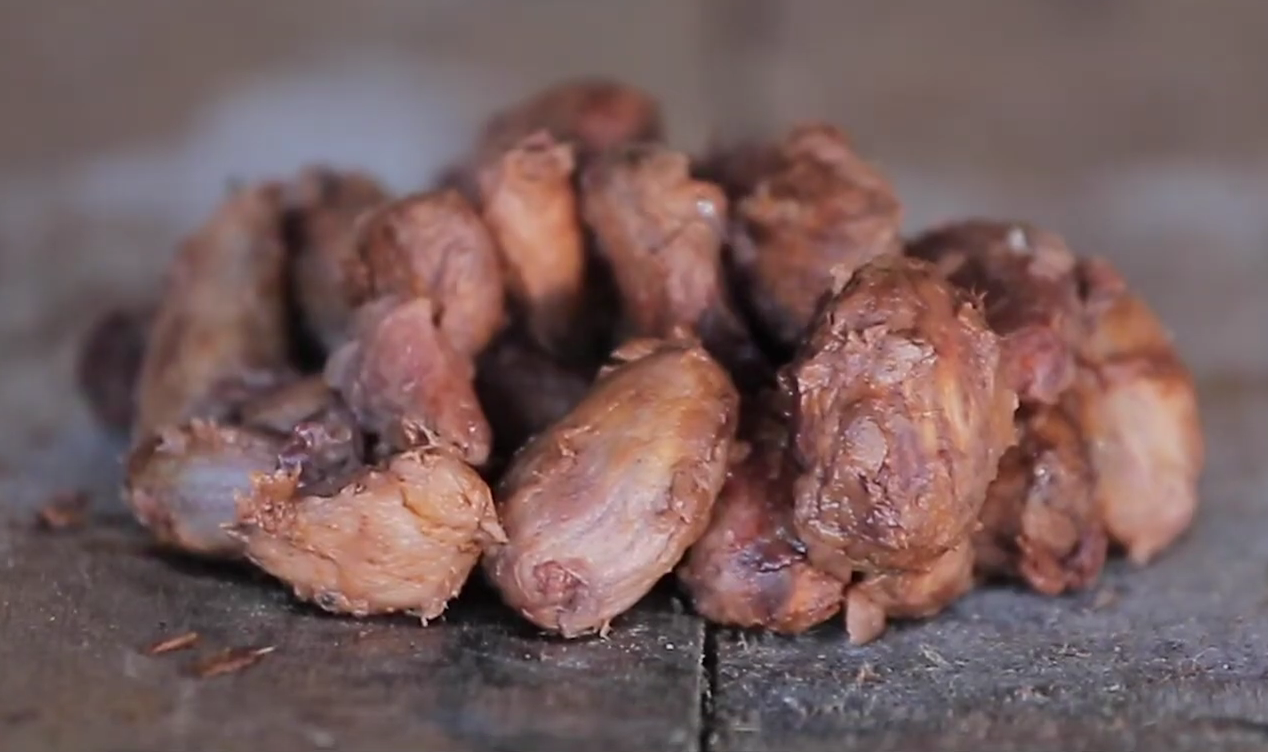

During fermentation, the bean embryo is killed by heat and acidity generated by microbes, providing for an environment where flavor precursors can develop. When beans are removed from their pods, they are naturally exposed to these microbes from the environment, most importantly anaerobic yeasts, lactic acid bacteria, and acetic acid bacteria. While all are present from the beginning of the fermentation, the role of each has more significance in different stages of a fermentation. Anaerobic yeasts are most prominent during the first 24–36 hours, where they convert sugars in the pulp to alcohol and carbon dioxide in highly acidic and low oxygen conditions. The carbon dioxide produced displaces air, keeping fermentation conditions anaerobic.

As yeasts break down more of the pulp, the beans are increasingly exposed to air, allowing acetic acid bacteria to become more active. These bacteria consume alcohol the yeasts have produced, producing acetic acid and increasing the temperature, in some reactions to over 50 °C (122 °F). These acidic and hot conditions kill the bean. After 4–5 days, lactic acid forms as lactic acid bacteria consume sugars and organic acids. As the temperature decreases around day four and acetic acid production slows, oxygen enters the environment, flowing over the beans. This permits aerobic reactions to occur, including the conversion of polyphenols into insoluble polymers.

As of 2013, the complexity of the process meant the number of reactions that occur during fermentation was unknown.

=== Bacterial contamination ===
The warm environment of part of the fermentation process permits the growth of thermophilic bacteria, primarily those in the genus Bacillus. Contamination during and before the fermentation process can introduce Salmonella. This is managed through roasting and/or by debacterisation. Overfermentation occurs as microbes that thrive in aerobic conditions found at the end of fermentation increase the acidic content and turn the beans black.

== History ==
It is unclear why humans first fermented and dried cocoa, other foods were perhaps first fermented and roasted and then such principles then applied to cocoa.

The method and length of cocoa bean fermentation has for hundreds of years depended on who is fermenting and where they are located. During the latter half of the 18th century, beans were fermented for three days in Trinidad under leaves and four to five in the neighbouring Caribbean colony of Saint-Domingue. William Gervase Clarence-Smith says this suggests extra time was necessitated by different varieties of cocoa beans being grown. In Venezuela, fermentation was undertaken for three days in stores, rarely at all in the lower Amazon, and in tins in São Tomé and Príncipe. By the middle of the 19th century, the length of fermentation was adjusted for which markets the beans were intended for: lightly fermented at night for the British palate, and for a longer five to eight days under banana or plantain leaves for the French and Spanish palates, which Clarence-Smith describes as "more discriminating". As Trinidad moved to growing cocoa on estates at the end of the 19th century, fermentation, undertaken in wooden boxes, varied in length from eight up to fourteen days for cocoa considered inferior. Beans in Mexico were washed pre-ferment, and in Nicaragua were left in concrete containers.

In the early 20th century, Criollo beans in Venezuela were fermented up to two days, while those categorised as Trinitario were fermented for up to eight days. For the latter, beans were left, drying in the sun, before being piled under banana leaves at night. Then coated with a red soil intended to protect against insects and disease, they underwent a final drying and were exported to French and Spanish markets. In the Americas, fermentation lengths varied from a day in Guatemala to 5–8 days in Suriname. In Suriname, fermentation was a labor-intensive process, involving beans being moved every day between compartments in long wooden crates under controlled temperature conditions. In the Amazon and Brazil beans were rarely fermented; Brazilian farmers who did rarely did so for longer than three days in old canoes, covered or in boxes. By 1923 in Costa Rica, United Fruit grew beans, and when harvested, transported them by rail to a single factory, where they were fermented for a relatively short four days, impacting quality. Small farmers still fermented in heaps.

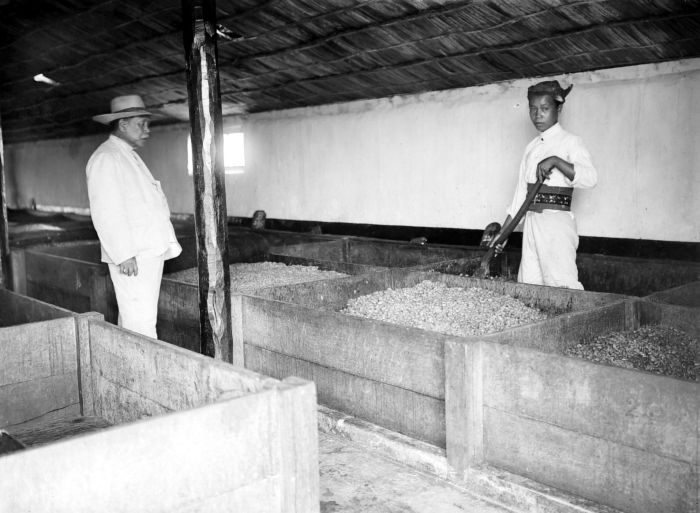
Box fermentation in Java, 1918

In Africa at the beginning of the 20th century, many countries fermented beans for around three days, although farmers fermented beans in the Congo Free State for eight days. In some countries such as east Java and São Tomé and Príncipe, beans were fermented in boxes while in Bioko, Equatorial Guinea, they were sometimes left in old canoes. In Gold Coast, farmers regularly ignored Department of Agriculture advice to use boxes as they found wrapping piles of cocoa beans in banana leaves just as effective, and less labor-intensive. In Nigeria, smallholders rarely fermented for more than three days, while Creole landowners fermented beans for six. Similarly, in the Caribbean, Dominican Republic smallholders rarely fermented beans, while estates fermented for up to eight days.

== Bean characteristics ==
=== Color ===
Fermentation using the box method. The change in appearance can be observed between the start of the ferment and day four.

Poor-fermentation can be seen visually, as most cacao is purple and becomes increasingly brown as it ferments. The color of beans is determined by their polyphenolic content, which undergoes changes during fermentation. The conversion of anthocyanins into cyanidins and sugars lightens the purple color typical of some cacao varieties, while the conversion of flavan-3-ols to quinones is responsible for the development of a brown/brown-purple coloration.

=== Flavor ===
Chocolate produced from beans dried without fermentation tastes bitter and has a muted cocoa flavor. Different amounts of fermentation create beans with flavors that are sour, "winey" or fruity, and different methods of fermentation produce different flavors. This can be seen by the practice in Brazil to ferment in wooden boxes, which produces beans more acidic than those produced in West Africa. The flavor precursors developed during fermentation are later turned into chocolate flavor during the roasting process.

Cocoa beans consist of cotyledon surrounded by a shell. Cotyledon contain two major types of cells, storage cells and pigment cells. It is within the cotyledon that flavor precursors develop during fermentation, after the bean is germinated and is then killed. In germination, the protein vacuoles within the storage cells take on water. As the cell dies, and the cell walls and membranes deteriorate, the cell components are free to interact and react with each other. These reactions produce the flavor precursors.

There are a few molecule groupings responsible for different flavors. Within the pigment cells, polyphenols and methylxanthines (caffeine and theobromine) give the product bitterness and astringency respectively. As fermentation develops, the concentration of polyphenols decreases. Maillard reaction precursors develop from proteins from the storage cells and sucrose, with the former hydrolyzed into oligopeptides and amino acids, and the latter into reducing sugars.

== Industry and politics ==
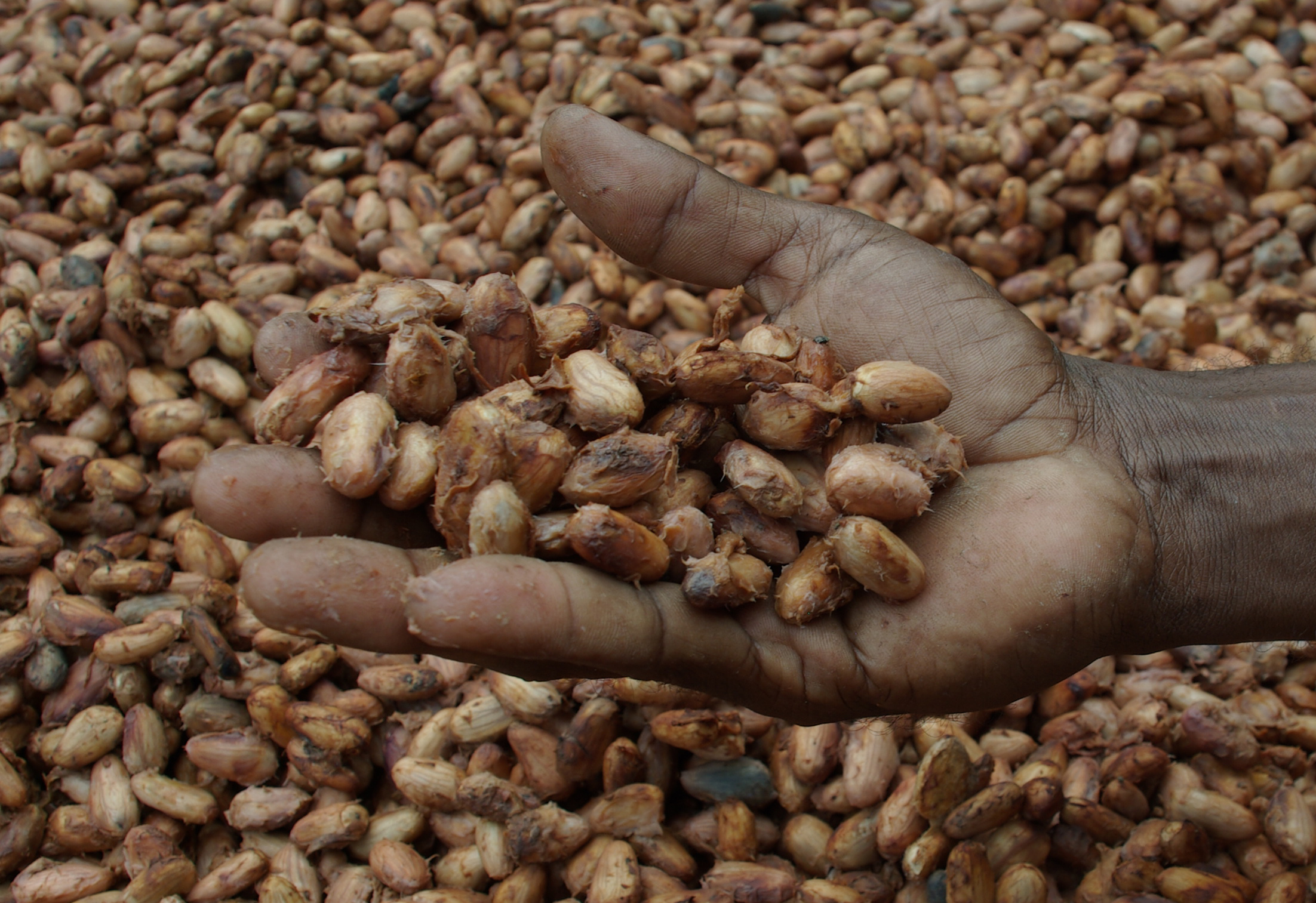
Fermented cocoa beans, drying in the sun

Cocoa growers sell beans 'wet' and 'dry'. When selling beans wet, farmers remove beans from pods and almost immediately sell them to a buyer. That buyer collects beans from multiple farms, and takes them to a central location, called a fermentary, where they are fermented and dried. This practice is common to some parts of the Asia Pacific, Central and South America, and the Caribbean. Farmers who sell beans dry have processed the beans by drying them on site. In West Africa, they ferment the beans first, while in countries such as Indonesia and Uganda, beans undergo minimal fermentation. Due to the limited to non-existent fermentation in Indonesia, beans are sold cheaply as they need to be combined with fermented beans to produce chocolate. While farmers get higher prices for dry beans than wet, to be able to ferment and dry beans, they need skills, equipment, and reliable weather conditions.

Cocoa fermentation as of 2018 was actively researched, with the goal of standardizing and optimizing processing. Such research is focused on biochemical rather than social phenomena. The research generally advocates for industrial fermentation rather than the practices used by smallholders. In Cocoa, Kristy Leissle characterizes this advocacy as unrealistic. In Ghana and India, there is a gendered division of labor in cocoa farming processes, with women performing more post-harvest work, including fermentation. Single-origin craft chocolate makers in the US have a strong preference for cocoa that has been centrally processed so that variability in product is minimized. As a result of this, growers performing on-farm fermentation have fewer opportunities for selling to the craft chocolate markets.

== Sources ==
- Burndred, Faith; Peace, Liz (2017). "Food safety in chocolate manufacture and processing". In Beckett, Stephen T; Fowler, Mark S; Ziegler, Gregory R (eds.). Beckett's Industrial Chocolate Manufacture and Use (5th ed.). West Sussex, UK: Wiley. ISBN 978-1-11878-014-5.
- Clarence-Smith, William Gervase (2000). Cocoa and Chocolate, 1765-1914. New York: Routledge. ISBN 978-1-134-60778-5.
- Fowler, Mark S; Coutel, Fabien (2017). "Cocoa beans: from tree to factory". In Beckett, Stephen T; Fowler, Mark S; Ziegler, Gregory R (eds.). Beckett's Industrial Chocolate Manufacture and Use (5th ed.). West Sussex, UK: Wiley. ISBN 978-1-11878-014-5.
- Greweling, Peter P (2013). Chocolates & Confections: Formula, Theory, and Technique for the Artisan Confectioner (2nd ed.). Hoboken, New Jersey: John Wiley & Sons. ISBN 978-0-470-42441-4.
- Leissle, Kristy (2018). Cocoa. Polity. ISBN 9781509513208. OCLC 988580966.
- Stauffer, Marlene B (2017). "Quality control and shelf life". In Beckett, Stephen T; Fowler, Mark S; Ziegler, Gregory R (eds.). Beckett's Industrial Chocolate Manufacture and Use (5th ed.). West Sussex, UK: Wiley. ISBN 978-1-11878-014-5.
- Ziegleder, Gottfried (2017). "Flavour development in cocoa and chocolate". In Beckett, Stephen T; Fowler, Mark S; Ziegler, Gregory R (eds.). Beckett's Industrial Chocolate Manufacture and Use (5th ed.). West Sussex, UK: Wiley. ISBN 978-1-11878-014-5.
