= Food Research International =

Peer-reviewed scientific journal

- Discipline: Food science
- Language: English
- Edited by: Anderson Sant'Ana

Publication details
- History: 2004-present
- Publisher: Elsevier
- Frequency: Monthly
- Open access: Hybrid
- Impact factor: 7 (2023)

Standard abbreviations
- ISO 4: Food Res. Int.

Indexing
- ISSN: 0963-9969 (print); 1873-7145 (web)
- LCCN: 97646657
- OCLC no.: 780574700

Links
- Journal homepage

Food Research International is a monthly peer-reviewed scientific journal covering various aspects of food science. It is published by Elsevier and was established in 1992. The editor-in-chief is Anderson Sant'Ana (University of Campinas).

The journal publishes research articles, reviews, and commentaries related to food research, including food chemistry, food toxicology, food engineering, and quality.

== Abstracting and indexing ==
The journal is abstracted and indexed, for example, in:

- CAB Abstracts
- Science Citation Index Expanded
- Scopus

According to the Journal Citation Reports, the journal has a 2023 impact factor of 7.
