= William Gervase Clarence-Smith =

William Gervase Clarence-Smith is Professor of the Economic History of Asia and Africa at SOAS, University of London. He received an M.A. from Cambridge, a DipPol from the University of Paris and a Ph.D. from London University.

Clarence-Smith is the editor of Journal of Global History published by the Cambridge University Press. He is an associate of the Indian Ocean World Centre. He is a member of the London Middle East Institute, the Centre of Iranian Studies, the Centre for Palestine Studies and the Centre for Gender Studies at the University of London.

Clarence-Smith is known for his research into two fields. One area is the history of economic commodities, the other being the history of religion, slavery and gender norms particularly in Africa and Southeast Asia. He is a Fellow of the Royal Asiatic Society and the Royal Historical Society.

Some of his publications include:

- The Economics of the Indian Ocean Slave Trade in the Nineteenth Century, ISBN 978-1138968318
- The Economics of the Indian Ocean and Red Sea Slave Trades in the 19th Century: An Overview
- Cocoa and Chocolate 1765–1914 (2000, Routledge, ISBN 0415215765)
- The global coffee economy in Africa, Asia and Latin America, 1500–1989 (2003, edited with S. Topik, Cambridge University Press, ISBN 9780521818513)
- Islam and the Abolition of Slavery (2003, Hurst & co, ISBN 1850657084)
- Sexual Diversity in Asia, c. 600–1950 (2012, edited with Raquel A.G. Reyes, Routledge, ISBN 9780415600590)
- Female circumcision in Southeast Asia since the coming of Islam, ISBN 978-1-61168-280-9
- The Third Portuguese Empire, 1825–1975, ISBN 978-0-7190-1719-3
