= La Maison du Chocolat =

French chain of chocolate boutiques

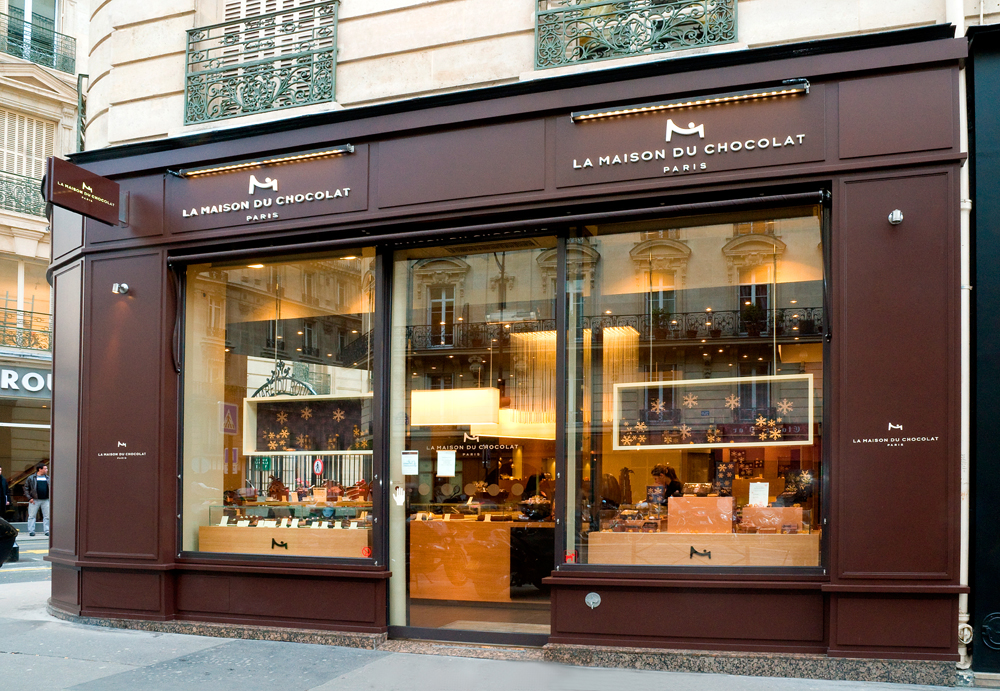
Branch on the Rue du Faubourg Saint-Honoré, Paris

La Maison du Chocolat (French pronunciation: [la mɛzɔ̃ dy ʃɔkɔla]; "The House of Chocolate") is a French chain of chocolate stores founded in Paris. It is a subsidiary of the French agribusiness group Groupe Savencia Saveurs & Spécialités.

== History ==
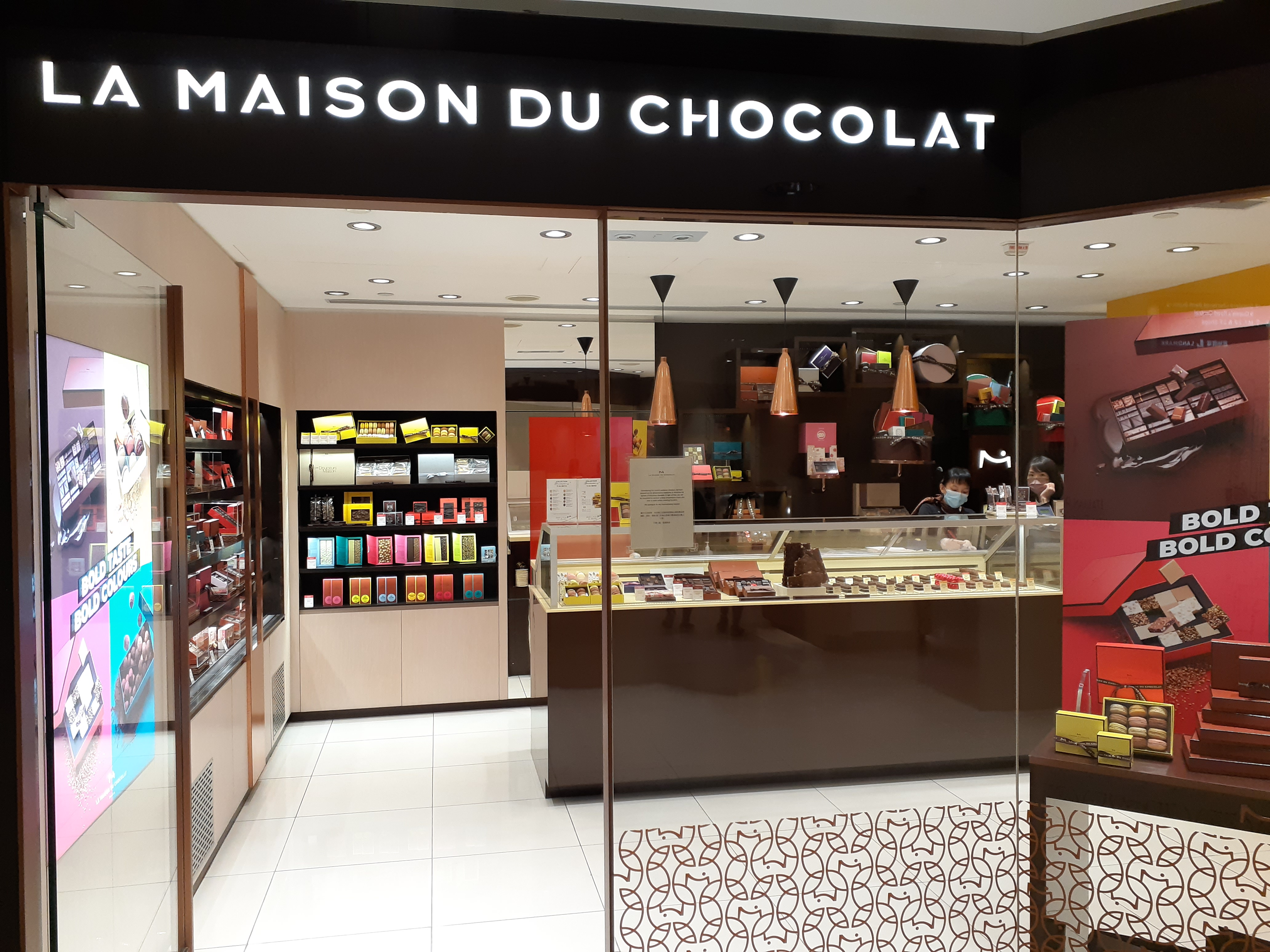
Branch in Hong Kong

In 1977, pastry chef Robert Linxe opened the first La Maison du Chocolat in Paris. Linxe was trained as a chocolatier in Bayonne, France and Switzerland. He later opened three more boutiques within Paris in 1987–1989, with a boutique in New York City opening in 1990.

In 1995, Geoffroy d’Anglejan was named general manager of La Maison du Chocolat. In 1996, Nicolas Cloiseau began working for the chain, and Linxe later noticed his work and created a position for Cloiseau in product design.

In 2007, the brand celebrated its 30th anniversary. D’Anglejan named Gilles Marchal as successor to Linxe. In 2012 d’Anglejan named Cloiseau to succeed Marchal with the title Master Chef. In June 2018, Guillaume Mazarguil became the CEO of La Maison du Chocolat.

== Controversies ==
In July 2018, the French online investigative and opinion journal Mediapart publishes an investigation according to a series of documents, issued by the French Labour inspection and the Minister of Labour, which relate practices of discrimination against one of its employees who complained in particular for acts of workplace harassment and sexual harassment within the company. The article refers to the case of another employee who was the victim of sexual harassment by another supervisor. Management of La Maison du Chocolat told Mediapart that the manager "was immediately laid off as a precautionary measure".
