= Cocoa (book) =

2018 book by Kristy Leissle

- Author: Kristy Leissle
- Publisher: Polity
- Publication date: 2018
- ISBN: 978-1-509-51316-1

Cocoa is a 2018 book by Kristy Leissle, a lecturer in global studies at the University of Washington Bothell.

The book covers cocoa's history, as well as contemporary production, economics, politics, trade, consumption and geography. In Cocoa, Leissle is critical of issues around cocoa including labor exploitation (both within and outside of Africa), gender inequalities, the fairness of 'fair trade', market concentration and ignorance regarding Africa's role in cocoa production. She is, however, optimistic for a future where farmers are valued. She argues for the environmental and financial benefits of farmers growing flavor cocoa, while saying this production will not grow to a large scale.

Multiple reviewers commented on the how concise the book was, to the point where James Field, writing in the magazine Geographical said it became dense at times, although this was balanced well by anecdotes. In his review, Field credited Leissle for recognizing her privileged position in discussing the topic.

== See also ==
- Cocoa production in Ivory Coast
- Cocoa production in Ghana
- Child labour in cocoa production

== Sources ==
- Carr, Teresa (February 13, 2020). "The Bitter Side of Cocoa Production". Sapiens.
- Chapman, Peter (February 12, 2018). "'Cocoa', by Kristy Leissle". Financial Times.
- Field, James (March 2018). "COCOA: by Kristy Leissle". Geographical. Vol. 90, no. 3. p. 55.
- Neville, Daragh (April–May 2018). "Raising the chocolate bar". The World Today. Vol. 74, no. 2. JSTOR 48564853.
