= Michel Cluizel =

French bean-to-bar chocolate manufacturer

Coordinates: 48.87709°N 1.0616°E

Manufacture Cluizel
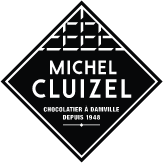
- Trade name: Michel Cluizel
- Company type: Société par actions simplifiée
- Industry: Confectionery
- Founded: 1948
- Founder: Marc Cluizel
- Headquarters: Mesnils-sur-Iton, France
- Products: Cacao beans, chocolate, couverture chocolate
- Revenue: €22.5 million ($25.1 million) (2016)
- Net income: €494,600 ($551,824) (2016)
- Number of employees: 200
- Website: Official website

Michel Cluizel is a bean-to-bar chocolate making company that was founded in the French town of Damville in Normandy in 1948 by Marc Cluizel.

== History ==
The company was founded when Michel Cluizel's parents Marc and Marcelle Cluizel expanded their pastry business into making chocolate from their own family kitchen. Later in 1948, Michel became an apprentice in his parents' business.

Their first export order came in 1981, as they dispatched products to the United States and they opened their first shop in Paris in 1987.

In 1999 Cluizel launched the Noble Ingredients program; a commitment to use high quality ingredients and eliminate use of artificial flavors and colors, soy lecithin and GMO ingredients.

The company has 200 employees, including the four children of the owner and name sake of the company. Michel Cluizel owns a store on Rue Saint-Honoré in Paris. In August 2004, the company opened a subsidiary in the United States –including a manufacturing facility and a museum– in West Berlin, New Jersey.

In 2002 the Cluizel family opened a chocolate museum in Damville. A decade later another museum opened near the U.S. factory.

== Production ==
Michel Cluizel is one of the few chocolatiers in the world to work directly from the beans of cocoa and not from chocolate or cocoa paste supplied by a third party. They also patented the term cacaofèvier to describe a bean-to-bar chocolate maker, and to distinguish themselves from competitors (four or five in France, including Valrhona, Weiss, the Cémoi group, Bonnat and around forty chocolatiers around the world). Thanks to its cocoa selection work, the company was able to develop “first plantation growths” bars made exclusively with beans from an identified plantation, like coffee or wine vintages, thereby enhancing the terroir.

Michel Cluizel's children now run the company, which produces its high-end chocolates in two factories, one in Damville, in Normandy, where 200 people work, as well as in West Berlin, New Jersey in the United States. Michel Cluizel products are aimed both at retail sale to individuals (chocolate bars, candies, etc.) and to professionals (couverture chocolate for baking, decorations for chocolate making, semi-wholesale white-label candies intended to be sold under another brand, etc.).

Range of single-origin chocolates by cocoa content:

Country	Plantation	Cacao percentage
Madagascar	Mangaro	65%
Mexico	Mokaya	66%
Saint Domingo	Los Anconès	67%
São Tomé	Vila Gracinda	67%
Brazil	Riachuelo	70%
Guatemala	La Laguna	70%

== Distribution ==
Michel Cluizel chocolates are distributed through a network of retailers, as well as at the factory in Damville and in five company-owned stores under the name Petite Manufacture Cluizel (formerly Les Chocolats Michel Cluizel). There are four in Paris: 201, rue Saint-Honoré (opened in 1987); 43 Rue des Belles Feuilles; Pl. Louis-Armand Galerie des Fresques; and 3, rue Tronchet; one in Neuilly-sur-Seine at 10, rue Madeleine-Michelis; and one in New York City, opened in 2009 on Madison Avenue and 35th Street.

== Distinctions ==
In 2012 Michel Cluizel products obtained the Entreprise du Patrimoine Vivant (‘Living Heritage Company’) label, a French government certification granted to traditional industries that successfully reconcile artisanship with modern manufacturing methods while maintaining production in France.

== See also ==
- List of bean-to-bar chocolate manufacturers
