= Rogue Chocolatier =

American bean-to-bar chocolate company

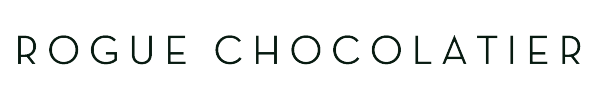
- Founded: April 2007
- Founder: Colin Gasko
- Defunct: 2019
- Headquarters: Minneapolis–Saint Paul, Three Rivers, Massachusetts
- Products: Bean-to-bar chocolate

Rogue Chocolatier was an American bean-to-bar chocolate maker founded and almost entirely operated by Colin Gasko. Started in 2007, Rogue used cocoa beans from locations not typically used in chocolate production, and through an unusually long and meticulous production process, created small quantities of chocolate bars for retail. Across the business's lifespan, it operated out of Minnesota and Massachusetts.

Rogue was responsible for introducing and popularizing sources of cocoa beans to market, including Peru and a site in Ecuador. The chocolate produced was widely praised: a 2015 profile of Gasko quoted expert Clay Gordon describing him as "probably the best chocolate maker in the country right now", and the products were extensively awarded. The bars were unadorned, tasting simply of chocolate without inclusions such as fruits or salt, highlighting the flavors of the beans terroir.

The company shut down in 2019, as Gasko criticized his business model, and that of craft chocolate more generally as environmentally and financially unsustainable. He further cited disillusionment with craft chocolate's ability to affect substantive change on the labor practices around cocoa production.

== History ==
=== Background ===
Rogue chocolatier was launched in 2007 by 22-year-old Colin Gasko. Gasko first took up chocolate making in 2006 as an "expensive hobby", after his boss at a Minneapolis Whole Foods taught him how to make rolled truffles and ganache. Initially making chocolate in a sober living house he ran for college students, Gasko used cheap, makeshift equipment: he ground cocoa beans using a small, hand-operated stone spice grinder and roasted them in an oven made from a box fan and a hair dryer. He learned through experimentation, study, and discussions with industry figures. Soon, he purchased better equipment and rented a 350 square feet (33 m^{2}) space on Hennepin Avenue that had previously housed a test kitchen for General Mills.

=== Operating ===
Rogue was incorporated in April 2007 and launched in November, an early part of what would become a wave of craft chocolate startups. Rogue was named by Gasko's coworker at Whole Foods; despite its name, it was a chocolate maker rather than a chocolatier. In October 2008, Rogue was featured on the tv show Martha, wherein Martha Stewart toured the factory. At the time, Gasko was struggling with sourcing and working machinery, as the industry was oriented to industrial production. His conching machine was a modified wet grinder, originally designed to make dosa batter. Rogue initially sold only to the Minneapolis–Saint Paul metropolitan area. In 2010 Rogue was still operating out of Minnesota, but by 2015, Gasko had moved operations to Three Rivers, Massachusetts.

Manufacturing chocolate bean-to-bar, from the start of operations Gasko paid cocoa producers twice the minimum. Gasko originally sourced beans from South America and Madagascar. By 2010, dissatisfied with the quality of beans he was getting from South America, he purchased a batch of beans from a single farm in Peru to create the Piura bar. The popularity of this chocolate, in part may have inspired the Peruvian government to promote local cacao, which by 2015 was a popular source for bean-to-bar chocolate makers in the US. About a year after making the Piura, Gasko met Vicente Norero, an Ecuadorian farmer who was using technology to innovate cacao fermentation and processing. With a blend of two beans Norero had fermented differently, Rogue released the 75% cocoa Balao bar, the first chocolate bar made with a blend of beans from the same farm. Other manufacturers soon followed with their own Balao bars.

In 2013 Rogue released the Porcelana bar, an 80% cocoa chocolate made from the Venezuelan Porcelana beans. The bar's flavor was intense, a break from the delicate flavor Porcelana beans are generally known for, and was the first time a chocolate made from the beans had been released in the US. By 2015, Gasko was researching how to create biodegradable packaging to hold chocolate within the wrapper that would not impact taste.

=== Closure ===
On June 6, 2019, Gasko initiated a crowdfunding campaign. He wanted $75,000 to pay debts, fund the completion of a final batch, and to transfer equipment and knowledge to a new owner in a cocoa-producing nation. He said he had lost confidence in the craft chocolate production model, saying a small positive social impact did not justify a large environmental impact and that craft chocolate could did not address the working conditions of the poorest farmers and producers. He also said Rogue was not profitable enough to support both his family and the business. The campaign was closed on June 26 after raising less than ten percent of the goal. Contributions were refunded, and it held out on the possibility of forming a non-profit to transfer ownership to.

== Colin Gasko ==
Profiles of Gasko described his approach to chocolate as intellectual. Interviewed in 2008, soon after founding Rogue, Gasko said he enjoyed the challenge of chocolate making and the potential for improvement. He was characterized as passionate, focused and giving great attention to details, and in 2015 was quoted as saying "I obsess about this 24 hours a day. My job is my life and creating meaning", while simultaneously saying chocolate made him "suicidally depressed" to the point he avoiding eating it. To support his partner and child, as of 2015 Gasko was living with his parents to save on rent as Rogue was not profitable. In profiles and reviews, his young age at the founding of Rogue and temperamental personality were highlighted.

As he shut Rogue down, Gasko said that he found the experience scary: "It's the only thing that I've ever been modestly successful at. My whole sense of identity and everything that I've ever worked on... all of that is going [away]." By the time Rogue was closed, Gasko disliked eating chocolate.

== Production ==
Rogue sourced cocoa beans from single-farmed lots in locations infrequently sourced for beans, such as such as Jamaica and Ecuador. While Rogue visited cacao growers, and attempted to build relationships, sourcing decisions were made by evaluating raw cacao provided by suppliers able to export to the United States. As of 2012, West African cocoa was not used, as Gasko said such cocoa had a standardized flavor inappropriate for single-origin chocolate, and because producers did not want to sell small amounts of cocoa for Rogue's small-scale production.

Cocoa beans were sorted by hand to remove debris (such as sticks, rocks) and germinated seeds. They were roasted in a convection oven, cooled and then hulled using a machine Gasko had designed and built. The nibs were ground with cane sugar to a paste containing particles smaller than 20 microns. They were then conched for between one and three days, and then molded, cooled and packaged. With few exceptions, the chocolates produced were a combination of sugar and cocoa, without the inclusion of ingredients such as additional cocoa butter, lecithin and vanilla. Gasko oversaw the packaging in letterpress-printed paper. By 2016, the inspiration for the packaging's design had moved from modelling off a historic, less-industrial production era, to emphasizing the role of science and technology in improving chocolate quality.

Producing each batch of bars took at least 45 days, significantly longer than competitors, with each individual bar requiring three days to make. As of 2015, for the existence of Rogue, Gasko had been the sole employee, apart from his long-term girlfriend who occasionally helped with roasting. Gasko said that he had not increased production since starting; the production technique made scaling up difficult. Production became more complex and labor-intensive as the business developed. At its peak, Rogue made a small amount of chocolate per month: 1,000 bars. While he had initially modelled his production after highlighting "aggressive" flavors (such as acidity), by 2015 he was modifying the way he roasted beans to highlight the bean's terroir.

== Products ==
The graphic design was impressed onto the chocolate's packaging using letterpress printing

Initially, Rogue sold two bars: the Ocumare, made using beans from the Ocumare Valley in northern Venezuela, and the Sambirano, made of beans sourced from the north-west of Madagascar. Writing in Gourmet Magazine, Dara Moskowitz Grumdahl described the former as tasting "massive", containing notes of "black walnut, bacon, blackberry, blackcurrant liqueur, peat-smoked whiskey, and sourdough toast". She described the latter as containing notes of "raspberry tea, cedar, cinnamon, and burnt lemon peel". She compared the two to alcoholic beverages; an old Scotch whiskey and a Chianti respectively.

A later bar was called the Hispaniola, a 75% cocoa chocolate named after the Caribbean island containing Haiti and the Dominican Republic where the cocoa was sourced. Going further than usual with single-origin chocolate, the cocoa was entirely sourced to a single drying and fermentation on a small co-op. With a smooth texture, it contained fruity and acidic flavors. The Rio Carabe bar, named for the town in Venezuela, was more intensely flavored. Gasko has said Rogue was the first company in the United States, and possible the second worldwide, to produce chocolate using beans from that source. Other bars included Jamaica, Porcelana, Balao and Sambirano. Rogue occasionally released limited edition bars. The chocolates were expensive, the Jamaica bar for example retailed for US$18 in 2015.

In a 2010 review for The Atlantic, Ari Weinzweig praised the texture of the Hispaniola bar, despite saying that it may not appeal to some people who prefer creamy chocolate. He highlighted what he described as the flavor's simplicity, giving it praise and saying the bar was particularly aromatic. In his review, Weinzweig took pains to praise the packaging's graphic design, saying "I buy by flavor, not fashion, but if I were going to buy a package alone, this would be one of them", researcher Kristy Leissle also praised Rogue's packaging, describing it as "elegant" in 2013. In 2011, food writer David Lebovitz positively reviewed a Piura bar. Rogue's chocolates were noted as primarily tasting of chocolate, rather than the other flavors such as fruit, nuts, or liquorice in chocolates produced by other manufacturers. The chocolates never contained inclusions such fruit or salt.

== Appraisal ==
The Good Food Awards named Rogue one of America's best chocolate brands every year between 2011 and 2014. In 2012, Bon Appétit listed Rogue as among the top twelve best new chocolate makers and chocolatiers in America, and in 2018, Eater listed Rogue among the top six bean-to-bar manufacturers in the United States.

In 2015, the Porcelana bar was awarded the gold medal at the International Chocolate Awards. That year, author Megan Giller wrote that chocolate expert Clay Gordon had described Gasko to her as "probably the best chocolate maker in the country right now." Rogue was not as widely known as other bean-to-bar manufacturers such as Mast Brothers.

== Sources ==
- "Actress Rosie Perez". The Martha Stewart Show. October 7, 2008. Archived from the original on October 11, 2009.
- Baxter, Annie (August 3, 2008). "Not even a slow economy can keep people from their chocolate". Minnesota Public Radio. Archived from the original on December 16, 2024.
- Cooper, Desiree; Sanchez, Marc (February 9, 2008). "The World's Smallest* Chocolate Factory". Weekend America. Archived from the original on December 13, 2024.
- Druckman, Charlotte (February 7, 2012). "The Forgotten Chocolatiers (Our "Black List" of America's Best New Chocolates)". Bon Appétit. Archived from the original on October 5, 2022.
- Galarza, Daniela (October 17, 2018). "The 24 Best Chocolate Shops in America". Eater. Archived from the original on October 2, 2023.
- Giller, Megan (2015). "Rogue Chocolatier: Why You've Never Heard Of The Best Chocolate Maker In America". Chocolate Noise. Archived from the original on September 14, 2024.
- Hallock, Betty (July 16, 2008). "Chocolate frontiers". Los Angeles Times. Archived from the original on December 13, 2024.
- Holt, Steve (24 November 2015). "Meet Colin Gasko, the Rogue Chocolatier". Boston magazine.
- Houck, Brenna (June 25, 2019). "Why One of America's Best Chocolate Makers Is Giving It All Away". Eater. Archived from the original on September 14, 2024.
- Kennedy, Alicia (October 26, 2020). "On Chocolate". From the Desk of Alicia Kennedy. Archived from the original on May 30, 2024.
- Kounang, Jasmine (August 12, 2010). "Rogue Chocolatier". Cool Hunting. Archived from the original on September 14, 2024.
- Leissle, Kristy (1 August 2013). "Invisible West Africa". Gastronomica. 13 (3). University of California Press: 22–31. doi:10.1525/gfc.2013.13.3.22.
- Moskowitz Grumdahl, Dara (January 15, 2008). "Colin and the Chocolate Factory". Gourmet. Archived from the original on September 14, 2024.
- Pioneer Press (January 9, 2008). "Faces: Q&A with Colin Gasko, owner/chocolate maker, Rogue Chocolatier". St. Paul Pioneer Press. Archived from the original on February 20, 2016.
- Sherred, Kristine (July 1, 2019). "Rogue Chocolatier's attempt to sell business falls short of goal". Confectionery News. Archived from the original on September 14, 2024.
- Silvasy-Neale, Kym (September 4, 2016). "Want to Know What's in the Mind of a Chocolate Maker?". The Chocolate Clinic. Archived from the original on June 1, 2022.
- Weinzweig, Ari (August 27, 2010). "The Artisanal Rogue in the Chocolate Section". The Atlantic. Archived from the original on October 28, 2013.
- Zwirn, Lisa (December 2, 2014). "New England's chocolatiers set the bar high". The Boston Globe. Archived from the original on December 7, 2014.
