= Noka Chocolate =

American chocolate company

Noka Chocolate (stylized NōKA) was an American company, founded by Canadian accountants Katrina Merrem and Noah Houghton and based in Plano, Texas, that marketed itself as "a chocolatier specializing in gourmet chocolate gifts." The company sold its products directly and through its primary retail partner, department store Neiman Marcus.

The company's products were made from chocolate it said was sourced from Venezuela, Trinidad, the Ivory Coast, and Ecuador. It provided its customers with a "Tasting Guideline" in every box. The company's founder said that its products are "not so much candy as a tasting experience." Given the prices charged for the chocolates, one newspaper wrote, "NoKA is not for the faint of heart -- or pocketbook."

In 2006, Business website Forbes.com included NōKA's Vintages Collection among a listing of the world's most expensive chocolates, at $854 per pound. D Magazine called the chocolates "insanely expensive."

NōKA went out of business in 2011.

== Couverture source and blog postings ==
In December 2006, the blog DallasFood.org published a ten-part series on the company's chocolate products that detailed the company's marketing claims and noted its refusal, unlike many other similar firms, to reveal the source of its couverture (the chocolate from which finished confections are made). It presented research on available couvertures that matched NoKA's descriptions of its product and concluded that NōKA sold an essentially unaltered version of couvertures produced by the French company Bonnat Chocolates while charging more than ten times the price asked by Bonnat.

The same blog published another article in December 2007 about the claim that the company's products had been chosen as the "Best Chocolate in America" by a taste-testing panel in The Nikkei, which NōKA identified as the "world's largest business daily". However, this panel's original results never appeared in the main edition of Nihon Keizai Shimbun (circulation ~5,000,000); their taste test was published only in the much smaller subsidiary Nikkei American Edition (circulation 12,650) as a paid advertisement.

Responding to the ten-part series, the company issued a statement on the site that originally hosted it. The statement, while maintaining the firm's position that "NōKA’s couverture is made to our strict specifications," did not deny that it came from the commercial supplier.

Texas-based public relations firm DPK Public Relations became involved in the online controversy regarding NōKA when DPK's principal posted comments in NōKA's defense on a number of blogs shortly before announcing that his firm was representing NōKA.

Discussing the online reaction to the blog's series, a representative of the Media Bloggers Association called it "a cautionary tale to a certain extent," adding, "Getting negative blog buzz, it could be a disaster."
