= Amano Artisan Chocolate =

American chocolate manufacturer

- Industry: Manufacturing
- Founded: 2005; 21 years ago
- Headquarters: Orem, Utah
- Key people: Art Pollard
- Products: Confectionery
- Website: www.amanochocolate.com

Amano Artisan Chocolate is an American bean-to-bar chocolate manufacturer based in Orem, Utah.

== Etymology ==
The company name is derived from the Italian word "Amano" which translates to "by hand" and "love".

== History ==
Amano Artisan Chocolate was founded by Art Pollard in 2005, in Orem, Utah. Pollard's first harvest for the company was some rare white beans he got from Villahermosa, Mexico that same year. Up until 2015, Amano only manufactured single-origin chocolates.

== Corporate affairs ==
Amano was the first chocolate manufacturer in Utah. The factory is located at a higher altitude than most other chocolate factories in the world(Orem, Utah: 4,774 ft / 1,455 m). The company claims that the high altitude affects flavor development during conching, and aids in the development of the taste of the chocolate. The company was also the first U.S. maker to use the rare Venezuelan Chuao bean.

== Products ==
Amano’s chocolate bars are made in small batches on vintage equipment, which allows the artisan chocolate maker to control and observe flavor development during each stage of manufacture. Amano’s chocolate making has evolved from Italian and French confectionery techniques. The company employs high proportions of cocoa (70%) in their chocolate, using bean from South and Central America as well as Africa and Oceania. Amano is kosher-dairy certified by the Denver-based Scroll K kashrus agency. The company also produces one-pound bags of chocolate coins for chefs.

== Recognition ==
Amano is distinguished as being the first American company at the Academy of Chocolate Awards to claim a Gold award, for bean-to-bar dark chocolate. In 2009 Martin Christy, founder member of the Academy of Chocolate and editor of SeventyPercent.com, named Amano as one of the top eight bean-to-bar chocolate companies in the world. Amano is the only American company to make Christy's list.

== See also ==
- List of bean-to-bar chocolate manufacturers
