= Zotter Schokolade =

Austrian chocolate manufacturer

Zotter Schokolade GmbH
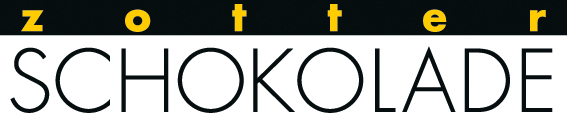

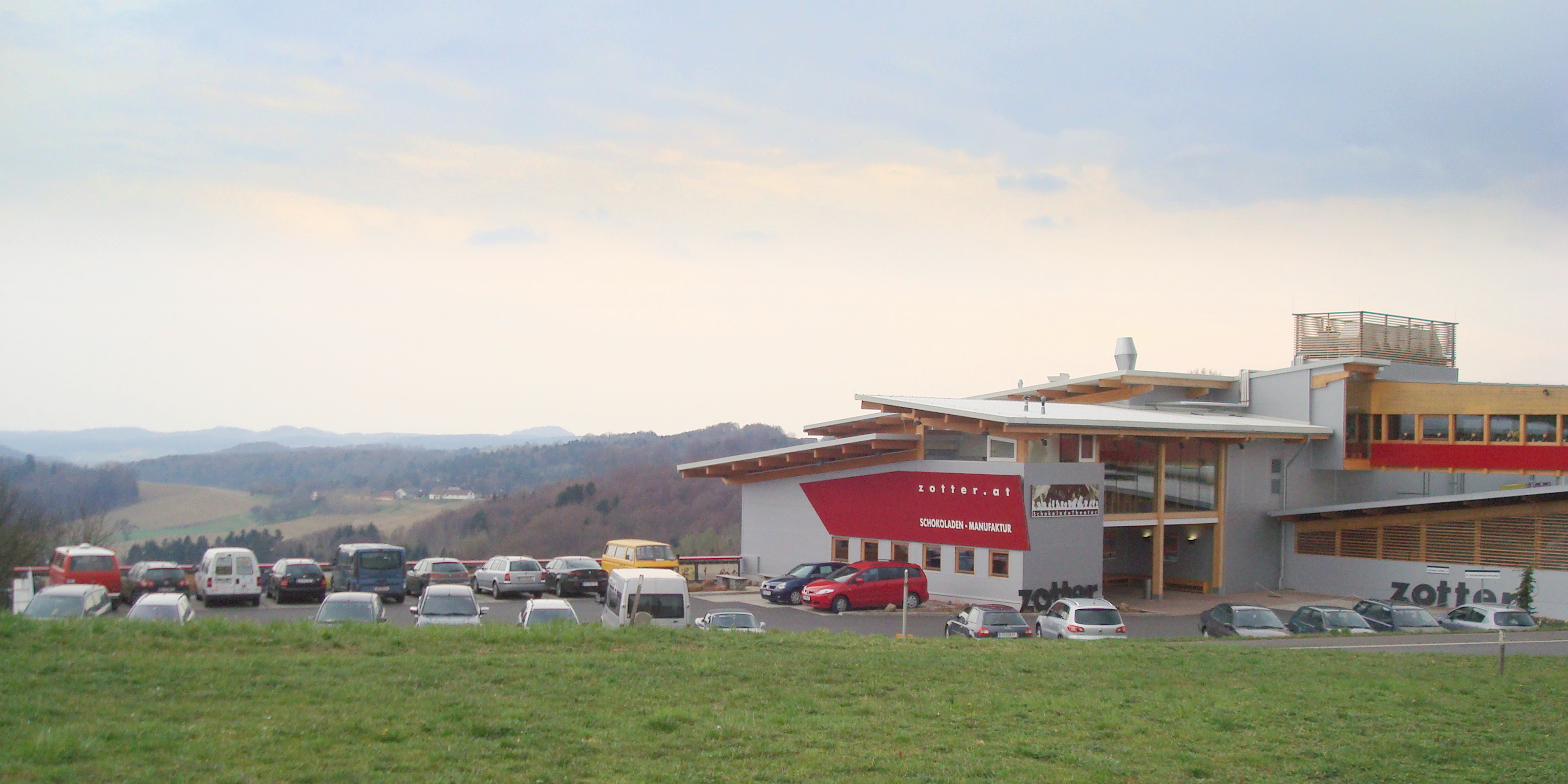
- Zotter Chocolate Factory and Experience World in Riegersburg
- Type: Privately held company
- Industry: Chocolatiering
- Founded: 1999; 27 years ago
- Founder: Josef Zotter
- Headquarters: Riegersburg, Styria, Austria
- Products: Chocolate
- Revenue: ▲€29 million (2021)
- Number of employees: 220 (2021)
- Website: www.zotter.at

Zotter Schokolade is an Austrian chocolate manufacturer specializing in organic and fairly traded bean-to-bar chocolate. The company was founded in 1999 by Josef Zotter and is based in Riegersburg, Styria. Zotter is mostly active in German-speaking Europe, with 90 percent of distribution outlets being located in Germany, Switzerland, and Austria. As one of Austria's most well-known trademarks, Zotter is considered a national high equity brand.

Zotter has been named one of Europe's leading chocolatiers by several media outlets, while the Zotter Chocolate Factory and the Experience Worlds in Riegersburg and Shanghai have repeatedly been featured in international media as an example of interactive and sustainability-focused experiential retail.

== History ==
The Zotter chocolate factory was founded in 1999 by Josef Zotter in the former stables of his parental farm in Riegersburg. Zotter and his wife had previously produced their own chocolate as the managers of a pastry shop in Graz, but had to face insolvency in 1996 after expanding too quickly. After moving back to his parents' farm in Riegersburg, Zotter decided to focus on chocolate and turned the farm's former stables into a small factory. With a large, experimental product range, Zotter managed to gain a foothold on the Austrian and German market. In 2002, Zotter created its first experiential retail section, a "tasting station" for the factory's visitors.

From 2004 to 2006, Zotter switched its entire product range to exclusively fairly traded and organic chocolate. Zotter has since opted for making separate contracts with small South American, African, and Asian farmers to directly source fairly traded cocoa.

In 2007, the chocolate factory in Riegersburg was expanded to allow for complete bean-to-bar manufacturing. The expanded factory included a new experiential retail section, which among other elements consists of a purpose-built cinema, an open view of the manufacturing process using elevated walkways across the factory floor, and several "tasting stations". In 2011, Zotter opened an "Edible Zoo" next to the chocolate factory, which serves products based on crops grown and livestock raised on the zoo premises. The Chocolate Factory and Experience World in Riegersburg is visited by approximately 220,000 tourists annually.

Since 2014, Zotter has expanded outside of Europe with the entry into the Chinese market - including the opening of a second Experience World in Shanghai in 2014 - and into the American market in 2015. The original Experience World in Riegersburg has been further expanded, adding among others a virtual reality experience, a miniature praline roller coaster, and a dentist's office serving exclusively sugar-free products.

== Production ==
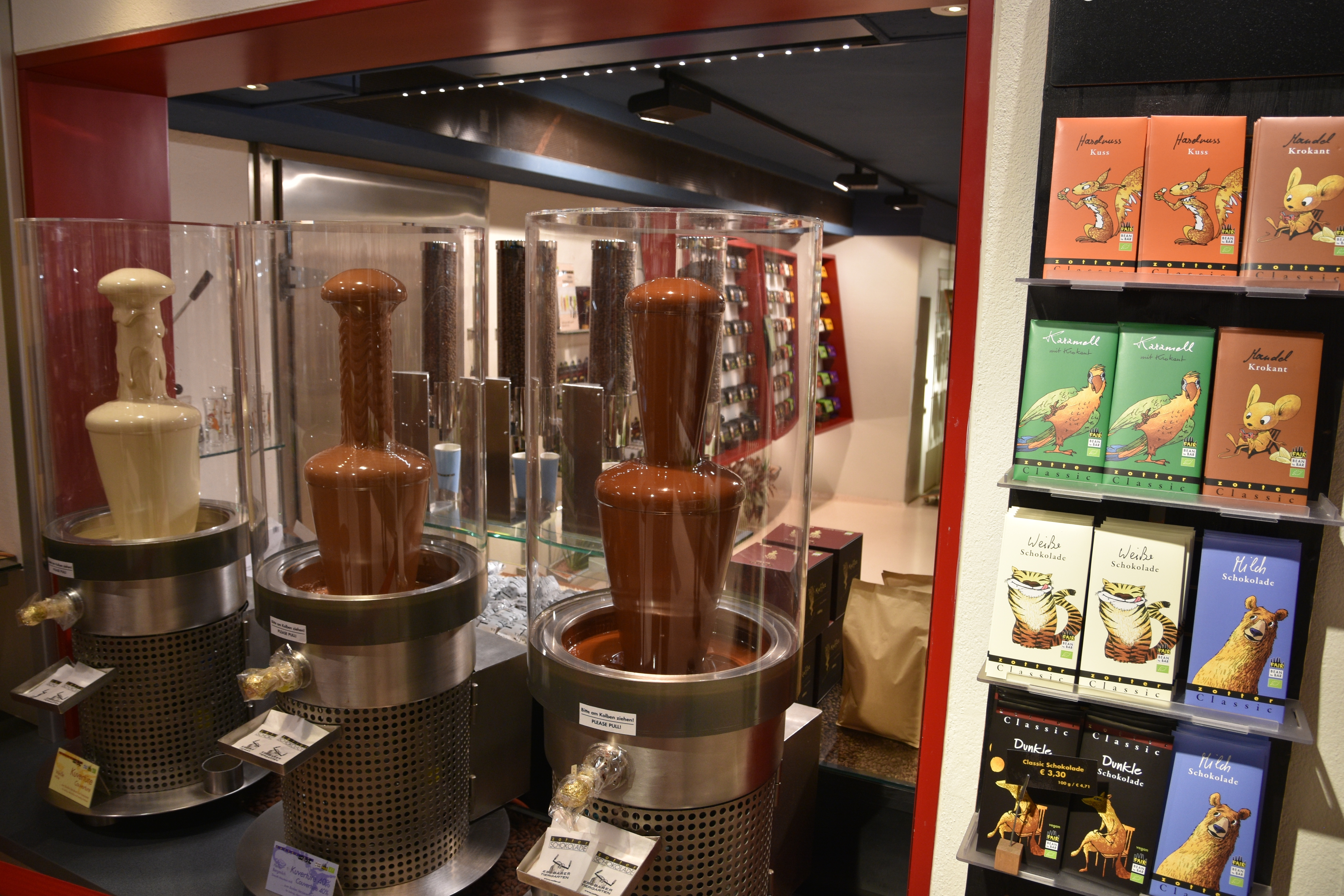
Chocolate fountains and Zotter products on display at the Chocolate Factory and Experience World in Riegersburg

Zotter processes approximately 250 tons of cocoa beans annually, producing approximately 500 different types of chocolate. Zotter is a bean-to-bar manufacturer, producing chocolate by processing cocoa beans in-house, rather than melting pre-made chocolate into their own product. The company is a member of the World Fair Trade Organization and carries a EU certification for organic food.

== Sales ==
Zotter chocolate is sold internationally at distribution outlets consisting primarily of small, specialized retailers as well as several supermarket chains. 90 percent of distribution outlets are located in German-speaking Europe. As of 2020, online sales of Zotter products mostly take place in German-speaking Europe as well, with Austria and Germany accounting for 93 percent, while the remaining EU states, China, and the US account for 7 percent.

== Current product range ==
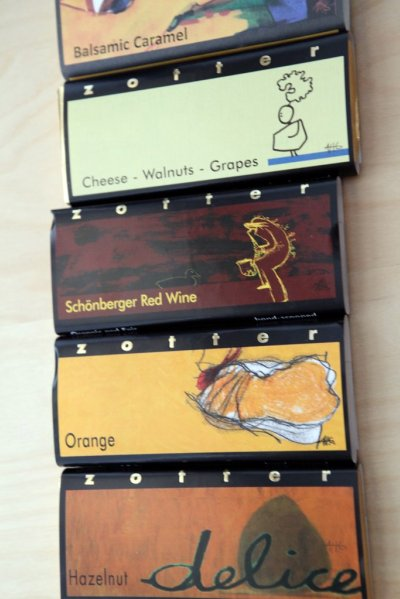
Zotter hand-scooped chocolates with wrappers designed by Andreas H. Gratze

All Zotter wrappers have been designed by artist Andreas H. Gratze since 1994.

- Hand-scooped chocolates: chocolate bars filled with several, often experimental ingredients
- Drinking chocolates: chocolate bars for melting in hot milk
- Labooko: single-origin chocolate bars, each focusing on a specific chocolate-growing region
- Mitzi Blue: two round, concentric chocolate bars decorated with nuts and edible flowers
- Squaring the Circle: sugar-free chocolate
- In-Fusion: chocolate bars "infused" with fruit couverture
- Classic: classic chocolate bars
- G. Nuss: chocolate bars with whole nuts
- Choco Lolly: chocolate lollipops
- Endorphins: chocolate pralines
- Nashido: chocolate bars with a creamy filling
- Nougat Bar: nougat bars covered with a layer of chocolate
- Nutting Hill: nougat bars with whole nuts, covered with a layer of chocolate
- over & under: nougat bars covered with fruit couverture
- Nougat Praliné: nougat pralines
- Balleros: dried fruit and nuts covered with chocolate, nougat or fruit couverture
- Nibs + Cocoa Beans: roasted cocoa bean snacks
- Choco Flakes: breakfast cereals
- Cake in a Glass: glass cakes
- Crema: sweet spreads
- Fine Couverture: couverture for baking and cooking
- Choco Nougat: nougat for baking and praline making
- Organic+Fair Coffee: coffee roasted by Zotter

== See also ==
- List of bean-to-bar chocolate manufacturers
