= Friis-Holm =

Danish chocolate manufacturer

- Type: Privately held company
- Industry: Chocolate production
- Founded: 2007
- Founder: Mikkel Friis-Holm Ottosen
- Defunct: 1 February 2023
- Headquarters: Lejre, Denmark
- Area served: Worldwide
- Products: Chocolate Bars, Nibs, Beans
- Website: www.friisholmchokolade.dk

Friis-Holm is a Danish bean-to-bar chocolate manufacturer founded by Mikkel Friis-Holm Ottosen and operating out of Herslev village in Lejre Municipality, Denmark.

== History ==
Mikkel Friis-Holm Ottosen, the founder of Friis-Holm, has a background as a chef. In 2000, he began importing Scharffen Berger chocolate to the Danish market. The company produced its first chocolate in 2007 after he had participated in a cocoa project in Nicaragua. The chocolate was initially produced at Bonnat's factory in France.

In 2015, Friis-Holm established its own production facility in the town Hvalsø, and moved 2019 to better facilities in the village Herslev in Lejre Municipality, Denmark.

== Products ==
Friis-Holm produces different types of chocolate bars, beans and nubs, including dark and white chocolates. The company sources parts of their chocolate from Nicaragua and in 2015, reported paying a 10-20% higher price for their cocoa than comparable Fairtrade products.

== Awards ==
Friis-Holm received an Annual Award from the Danish Chocolate Society in 2012. It has also won a number of awards at the International Chocolate Awards in London. At the 2014 International Chocolate Awards, Friis-Holm won a gold medal at the world finals in the Bars – Milk plain/origin bars category for their Dark Milk 65% chocolate, as well as two bronze medals in the Bars – Dark plain/origin bars category for their Johe and Nicaliso 70% chocolates.
