= Yu Chocolatier =

Taiwanese boutique chocolatier and pâtisserie

Yu Chocolatier 畬室法式巧克力甜點創作
- Type: Private
- Industry: Chocolate / Pâtisserie
- Founded: 2015
- Headquarters: Taipei, Taiwan
- Key people: Yu-Hsuan Cheng (Chinese: 鄭畬軒; Founder and head chef
- Products: Chocolate, bonbons, cakes, seasonal specialties
- Website: yuchocolatier.com.tw

Yu Chocolatier (Chinese: 畬室; pinyin: Yú Shì), also styled Yu Chocolatier • 畬室, is a Taiwanese chocolatier and pâtisserie based in Taipei. Founded by Yu-Hsuan Cheng (鄭畬軒) in 2015, the business produces chocolate and pastry items using French methods mixed with Taiwanese ingredients.

== See also ==
- List of bean-to-bar chocolate manufacturers
- Fu Wan Chocolate
- Q sweet
