= The City Bakery =

Bakery, cafe, chocolate shop, caterer and wholesaler

- Type: Private
- Industry: Food
- Founded: December 8, 1990; 35 years ago Union Square, Manhattan, New York City, New York, U.S.
- Founder: Maury Rubin
- Headquarters: 3 West 18th Street, New York City, New York, U.S.
- Number of locations: 13 (2017)
- Area served: United States and Japan
- Products: Baked Goods; Sandwiches; Salads; Hot Chocolate; Coffee
- Number of employees: 150 (2017)
- Website: www.thecitybakery.com

The City Bakery was a bakery, cafe, chocolate shop, caterer and wholesaler. Its first location opened in Lower Manhattan of New York City in 1990. There were eight City Bakery locations in Japan: Tokyo, Osaka and Fukuoka. City Bakery Detroit was its last expansion. City Bakery also owned and operated six eco-minded bakeries called Birdbath Neighborhood Green Bakery in New York. The City Bakery closed on October 20, 2019 due to debt-related financial difficulties.

== History ==
City Bakery was established in New York in 1990 by Maury Rubin, a television producer and director at ABC Sports, after studying pastry making in Lyons with Denis Ruffel of Patisserie Millet in Paris and having served as an apprentice pâstissier in Paris.

== Locations ==
=== Union Square, Lower Manhattan ===
City Bakery opened in the Union Square neighborhood of Lower Manhattan on December 8, 1990. Its menus were determined by the foods supplied by small family farms in the New York region, much of which was purchased at the nearby Union Square Greenmarket. Suppliers have included Glensfoot Dairy of Cherry Valley and Community Mill & Bean of Ithaca, for certified organic flour and oats. Its baked goods included Lemon Tart in a Chocolate Crust, Milky Way Tart, Chocolate Custard infused with Ethiopian Coffee Beans, Passion Fruit Tart with a Raspberry Polka Dot, Orange Tarts Made out of Apples, Bunch of Nuts in a Tart, World's First Stuffed Raspberry Tart, Fresh Ricotta Tart with Fruit and Edible Flowers. A cookbook, designed by Rubin, Book of Tarts: Form, Function and Flavor at City Bakery, won the 1996 International Association of Culinary Professionals Cookbook Design of the Year Award. The Pretzel Croissant was created in 1996 by combining a traditional French croissant with some of the ingredients of a classic German pretzel. In 2015, The New Yorker magazine produced a video on how the Pretzel Croissant is made.

City Bakery made what it called "Real Hot Chocolate" from high-quality couverture chocolate, melted to create an intensely rich chocolate drink. It established the City Bakery Annual Hot Chocolate Festival, held every February, with a different flavor of hot chocolate every day of the month. The New York Times attributed a trend in high-quality hot chocolate in city eateries to the influence of City Bakery: " ... what is no mystery is the effect Mr. Rubin's hot chocolate had on the city's hot chocolate landscape. He opened the floodgates for the sea of serious hot chocolate contenders that exist in New York today." City Bakery also offers savory foods, salad, sandwiches, pizzas and soup.

City Bakery operated at 22 East 17th Street from 1990 until April 2001, when it moved one block west across 5th Avenue to 3 West 18th Street, a space five times larger than the original.

City Bakery's design was unique, featuring 22-foot-high ceilings with stark white walls decorated only with cake boxes - a playful homage to the landmark Chrysler Building, decorated with hubcaps near its spire.

=== Birdbath Neighborhood Green Bakery ===
In 2005, Maury Rubin designed and built an experimental 240-square-foot bakery that had no formal name, but featured the words "Build A Green Bakery" on the front window. The concept for the bakery was to run an environmentally-friendly food business in a big city. It offered only ten pastries and four drinks, priced at $2 and $1, respectively. The bakery was built out of sustainable building materials like wheat board - a plywood-like material made from surplus straw and wheat - a cork floor and LED lights. The bakery, at 223 First Avenue, was located on a newly built bike path by New York City, and bike riders were offered a 50% discount if they entered with their bike helmet. Due to popularity, the discount was reduced to 15%. Other green initiatives: the bakery used wind-power; the staff wore shirts, hats and jackets that were either vintage or made from bamboo or hemp; and food waste composting. The intention of not naming the bakery in the early days was to entice customers to ask questions about the design materials the bakery was built from and hopefully discuss the environmental mission of the business with staff.

Of the bakery with no name, New York magazine wrote: "When is a bakery not a bakery? When it’s a political statement, an architectural pioneer, and a bit of performance art, all wrapped in one." After six months, the bakery was formally named Birdbath Neighborhood Green Bakery, and has since expanded to five locations in SoHo, Midtown and the Upper West Side of Manhattan.

=== City Bakery Japan ===
In 2013, City Bakery Osaka, a licensed operation, opened in Grand Front Plaza. City Bakery Osaka opened with long lines for several months, and was forced to establish a limit of two Pretzel Croissants only for each customer. Since then, City Bakery has opened locations in Tokyo, including Shinagawa Train Station and Tokyu Plaza in the Ginza Shopping District. These locations continue to operate under license.

=== Detroit ===
The Detroit location of City Bakery, in the Fisher Building in New Center, opened January 29, 2018.

== Critical response ==
The New York Times Magazine called Maury Rubin "a baking impresario." Smithsonian magazine has called the City Bakery croissant "the best croissant...in New York City." When City Bakery expanded to a new space in 2001, New York magazine wrote "you'll never have to leave." The Los Angeles Times called Maury Rubin "[a baking] master." The New York Times Food Section, writing about Maury Rubin and the pursuit of the perfect chocolate chip cookie, said: "what he's doing is brilliant."
