= Fu Wan Chocolate =

Taiwanese bean-to-bar chocolate manufacturer

- Type: Private
- Industry: Bean-to-bar chocolate
- Founded: 2015
- Headquarters: Pingtung, Taiwan
- Key people: Warren Hsu (Founder / CEO)
- Products: Chocolate (bars, drinking, local-ingredient)
- Website: fuwanshop.myshopify.com

Fu Wan Chocolate (Chinese: 福灣巧克力; pinyin: Fú Wān Qiǎokèlì) is a bean-to-bar chocolate manufacturer based in Pingtung County, Taiwan. It was founded in December 2014 in Pingtung by Warren Hsu. At the International Chocolate Awards held in Taiwan in 2018, Fu Wan Chocolate received five gold, six silver, and five bronze medals.

== See also ==
- List of bean-to-bar chocolate manufacturers
- Q sweet
- Yu Chocolatier
