= Castronovo =

Castronovo or Castronuovo may refer to:

- Castronovo di Sicilia, a comune in Sicily
- Castronuovo di Sant'Andrea, a comune in Basilicata, Italy
- Charles Castronovo (born 1975), American tenor
- Deen Castronovo (born 1964), American drummer and singer
- Raúl Castronovo (1949–2026), Argentine footballer
- Castronovo Chocolate, an American craft chocolate maker
