= Whittaker's =

New Zealand confectionery manufacturer

J.H. Whittaker & Sons, Ltd
- Trade name: Whittaker's
- Type: Private
- Industry: Confectionery
- Founded: 1896; 130 years ago in Christchurch, New Zealand
- Founder: James Henry Whittaker
- Headquarters: Porirua, New Zealand
- Owner: Whittaker family
- Website: whittakers.co.nz

J.H. Whittaker & Sons, Ltd, trading as Whittaker's, is a New Zealand confectionery manufacturer specialising in palm oil-free chocolate. Whittaker's is the largest chocolate brand in New Zealand. Approximately 30% of their production is now exported. The company controls its entire manufacturing process in its facility in Porirua, identifying itself as a "bean-to-bar" manufacturer. James Henry Whittaker (1868–1947) started the business in Christchurch in 1896; it was later moved to Wellington, and then to its current location in Porirua.

== History ==
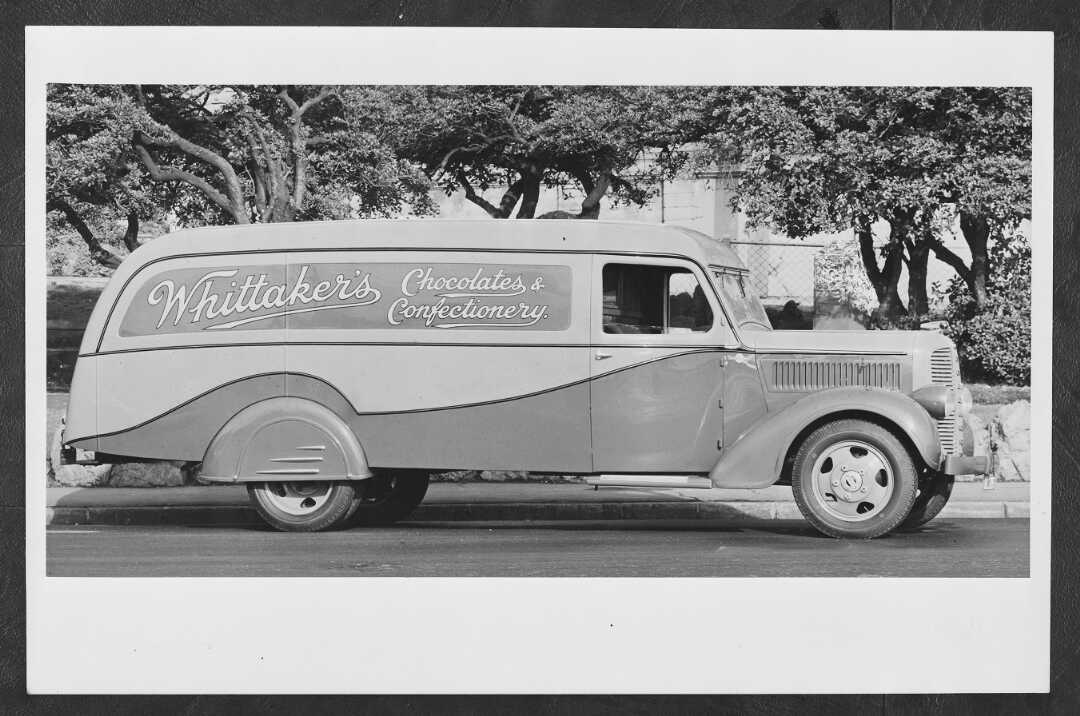
Whittaker's Chocolates & Confectionery Company's Fargo Truck

James Henry Whittaker (1868–1947) worked in the British confectionery industry from the age of 14 and moved to New Zealand with his wife Leah Alice in 1890. He was a salesman for Cadbury's chocolate before and after his move to New Zealand. In 1896, he started manufacturing chocolate confectionery, selling it directly to customers using a horse and van. In 1913, he established a partnership with his two sons, Ronald and James, based in Wellington. The business became a limited liability company in 1937, with third-generation Whittakers still the sole shareholders in the company. In 1969 the company moved from Wellington to Porirua, because they needed more space and their premises at 167 Vivian Street were under threat from motorway development. The Peanut Slab was invented in the 1950s and Whittaker's began exporting it in 1985. In the 1970s and 80s they also produced Santé Bars, Toffee Milk Bars and K-Bars. The company began producing large blocks of chocolate in the 1990s. In 1992, the company formed J. H. Whittaker New Zealand Ltd.

In June 2014, Whittaker's expanded its market to Malaysia.

In 2014, Whittaker's set up a programme to support and improve cocoa bean production in Samoa, and in 2017 expanded the programme to involve New Zealand's Ministry of Foreign Affairs and Trade. In 2019, Whittaker's admitted that while some bars have ethically-sourced cocoa beans, the sugar is primarily sourced from Thailand. Thailand is known to have child labour in the sugar cane industry. In 2020, Whittaker's announced that its 116 products made with Ghanaian cocoa beans would now be 'Rainforest Alliance Certified'. The company also uses small amounts of beans from Samoa and Nicaragua.

== Promotion ==
The company's marketing phrases include "A passion for chocolate since 1896", "good honest chocolate" and "from bean to bar".

The company has provided commercial sponsorship for motor sports in New Zealand and for the All Blacks.

In May 2014, celebrity chef Nigella Lawson filmed an advert for Whittaker's in the 1930s Wellington railway station. Later, in 2022, Karl Urban appeared in an advert as a fictionalised time-travelling James Whittaker, appearing in Wellington's Civic Square.

== Awards ==
In 2011 Whittaker's was listed as New Zealand's third most trusted brand by a Bradley Colman survey. From 2012 to 2023 Whittaker's was voted New Zealand's most trusted brand, benefitting from Cadbury's 2009 bad publicity surrounding palm oil and changes in product size, and further fallout from Cadbury's closure of its Dunedin factory in 2017. In 2023, Whittaker's also won 'Most Trusted Confectionery' and 'Most Trusted New Zealand Iconic Brand'. Organisers of the 2023 survey stated that Whittaker's success stemmed from its engagement with its customers, integrating their ideas into the business. Whittaker's was also transparent about aspects of their products, including price changes, which helped build trust with consumers.

Apart from being named as New Zealand's most trusted brand, the company has won other awards including 'Exporter of the Year' at the 2021 ExportNZ ASB Wellington Export Awards and Supreme Award in the 2022 Wellington Gold Awards, which are awarded to recognise businesses in the Wellington region.

In 2026, Whittaker's was named as Australia's favourite chocolate block in a Canstar Blue survey of over 2000 Australian consumers. This was the third consecutive year that the brand won the award.

== Special products ==
In 2016, Whittaker's launched a hollow chocolate kiwi clutching an egg as an Easter egg product. Twenty cents from each purchase was donated to a charity supporting kiwi conservation. The kiwi eggs were not produced in 2024 or 2025 due to production capacity issues and a global cocoa shortage.

In 2020, Whittaker's produced a limited-release Māori language label for its 'Creamy Milk' chocolate block for social media engagement purposes. In August 2022 the company distributed chocolate with a Māori label nationwide for Māori Language Week. The label had the chocolate variety 'Creamy Milk' written in Māori as 'Miraka Kirīmi'. The initiative was met with both praise and hostility from the public. In 2024 Whittaker's announced that it would no longer produce the Māori label, but would be supporting Māori Language Week in other ways.

Singer Ed Sheeran visited New Zealand in February 2023 and said via Instagram that he liked New Zealand chocolate. Whittaker's responded by sending Sheeran a block of Creamy Milk with Sheeran's face on the label, calling it the 'Ed Block'. Whittaker's then teamed up with Sheeran to auction signed T-shirts and a supply of chocolate to raise funds for victims of the 2023 Auckland Anniversary Weekend floods.

In March 2024, Whittaker's announced the discontinuation of Toffee Milks.

== See also ==
- List of bean-to-bar chocolate manufacturers
