= Woodblock Chocolate =

Company based in Portland, Oregon, U.S.

Coordinates: 45.5353°N 122.6486°W

- Logo

- Exterior of the facility in Northeast Portland's Irvington neighborhood, 2025
- Owners: Charley and Jessica Wheelock
- Website: woodblockchocolate.com

Woodblock Chocolate is a chocolate company based in Portland, Oregon, United States. The business operates a manufacturing facility in Northeast Portland's Irvington neighborhood.

== Description ==
The chocolate company Woodblock Chocolate is based in Portland, Oregon, operating a 4,500-square-foot shop and manufacturing facility at the intersection of 17th Avenue and Broadway in Northeast Portland's Irvington neighborhood.

The New York Times has described Woodblock as "a family-run manufactory and shop, where you can watch the chocolate-making process, gorge on samples and buy sesame, salted nib or single origin bars". Portland Monthly has described Woodblock as a "husband-and-wife-owned high-end chocolate company". The business has sold dark chocolate heart pops for Valentine's Day.

== History ==
Woodblock is Portland's first bean-to-bar business. Charley and Jessica Wheelock are co-owners. Woodblock products became available at Olympia Provisions in 2011. In 2014, the business announced plans to open a retail location in Southeast Portland.

In 2015, Woodblock's 100-gram Trinidad Fundare bar sold for $100. Proceeds from the bar benefitted the Cocoa Research Centre. In 2016, Woodblock collaborated with the cannabis shop Serra Cannabis to create a collection of edibles. There was a burglary at Woodblock in 2019.

Spella Caffè operated from Woodblock's facility, until 2025. In 2025, Sea Wolf Bakers co-founder Jesse Schumann announced plans to launch a bakery called Woodblock Bakery from within Woodblock Chocolate. Woodblock Bakery hosted on-site sourdough classes. The business became known as Shorebird Bakery and relocated to Northwest Portland in 2026.

Woodblock has made custom chocolate for Bakeshop. Little T American Baker has served chocolate chip cookies with chocolate from Woodblock. Salt & Straw has also used chocolate from Woodblock.

== Reception ==
Mattie John Bamman of Eater Portland called Woodblock "one of the city's most renowned chocolate producers" in 2016. Woodblock was a runner-up in the Best Chocolatier category of Willamette Week's annual 'Best of Portland' readers' poll in 2020. In 2022, Michael Alberty of The Oregonian called the business "one of America's premier bean-to-bar producers". Katherine Chew Hamilton of Portland Monthly said Woodblock had the metropolitan area's best hot chocolate in 2023.

== See also ==
- List of bean-to-bar chocolate manufacturers
