= Mast Brothers =

Chocolate company in New York

- Industry: Chocolate
- Founded: Brooklyn, New York, October, 2007.
- Area served: United States; United Kingdom
- Key people: Rick and Michael Mast
- Products: Chocolate bars, beverages, and confections.
- Owner: Rick and Michael Mast
- Number of employees: 50
- Website: http://mastbrothers.com/

Mast is an American chocolate company headquartered in Brooklyn, New York. The company was founded in 2007 by brothers Rick and Michael Mast from Primghar, Iowa. Mast Brothers, according to Vanity Fair, is "widely credited for introducing artisanal chocolate to mainstream American culture" and has been instrumental in popularizing the bean-to-bar movement in America. However, Mast Brothers has also faced criticism and allegations that for a time after the company's creation, they did not make their chocolate in the "bean-to-bar" style they claimed.

== History ==
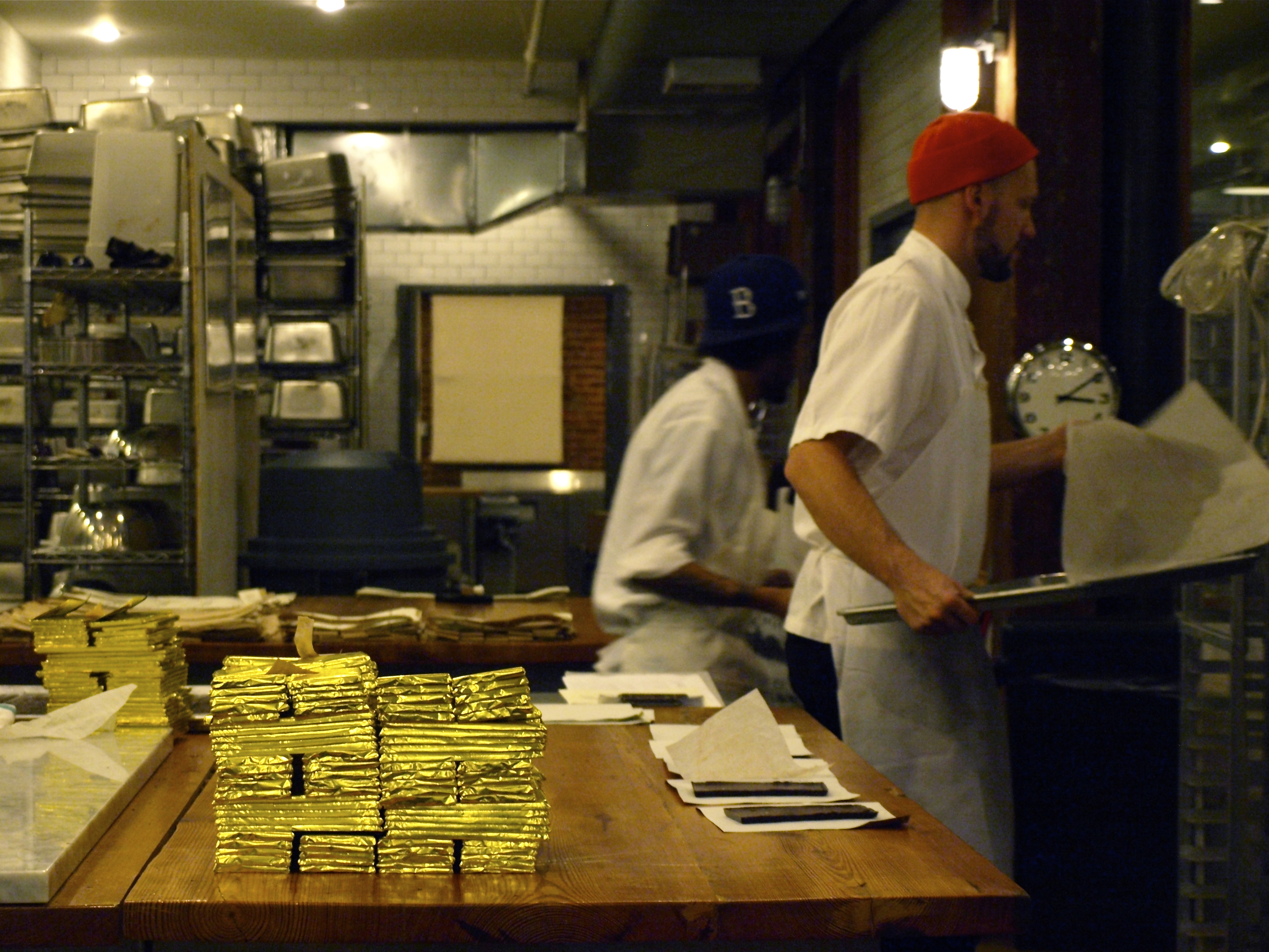
The Chocolate Factory in Williamsburg, New York, in 2012

According to The Wall Street Journal, in May 2011, Mast Brothers chartered the three-masted Black Seal, a 70-foot schooner built over 25 years by Captain Eric Loftfield, to sail from Cape Cod, Massachusetts to the Dominican Republic in order to pick up 20 tons of cocoa beans. On June 14, 2011, the Black Seal arrived at the Red Hook waterfront in Brooklyn where a group of deckhands and makers of artisanal chocolate unloaded the cocoa beans from the schooner. It was the first time a sailing ship had unloaded commercial cargo in New York since 1939, according to one city official.

In March 2015, the online magazine Slate published a critical piece about Mast Brothers, condemning their lack of involvement in the artisanal chocolate business community, and alleging that a few boutique chocolate retailers avoid carrying their products. The company faced further controversy later that year when a Dallas-based food blogger, Scott Craig, challenged whether Mast Brothers had always been an in-house "bean to bar" operation as they claimed. Instead, he asserted during their first years of operation, they had melted down chocolate (known as couverture) from another high-end French supplier, Valrhona, mixing it with their own ingredients. Mast Brothers acknowledged it used some couverture in addition to making their own chocolate in its early experimentations but said that the practice had ended in 2009, and that none of their early products had ever been misrepresented as "bean to bar" offerings.

Mast Brothers opened the first bean-to-bar chocolate factory in Los Angeles, California in May 2016. The chocolate factory was located in a 6,000 square feet (560 m^{2}) warehouse in the Arts District. In 2017, the company announced the closure of this retail space, along with their London location.

The company's Brooklyn building was located in Williamsburg. Encompassing 3,000 square feet (280 m^{2}), the chocolate shop was located inside a building that once served as a spice factory and today houses various small companies. The store closed in 2019 and the company opened Mast Market in Mount Kisco, New York later that year. Notable former employees in New York include Rose McAdoo.

Mast Brothers opened London's first commercial bean-to-bar chocolate factory which has since closed on Redchurch Street in Shoreditch, an East London neighborhood, where customers could see the chocolate production process as well as buy chocolate products. As of early 2018, Mast Brothers had permanently shut their London retail location.

== Products ==
Makers of bean-to-bar chocolate oversee every step of the production process, from the cocoa bean to the wrapped bar. Mast Brothers offered 12 varieties of chocolate bars with their 2016 Collection, which launched during the London Design Festival. The 2016 Collection consisted of six dark chocolate bars (Sea Salt, Mint, Olive Oil, Almond Butter, and their signature Dark) and six milk chocolate bars (Goat Milk, Sheep Milk, Vanilla, Maple, Coffee, and their signature Milk). The bars were available in three sizes.

In addition, Mast Brothers made a variety of chocolate confections at their Brooklyn and London locations, and they offer a hot chocolate made by steaming shaved chocolate with milk, a brewed hot chocolate using a siphon, and a chocolate beer that is brewed in-house with roasted cacao, cane sugar and water before being carbonated with nitrogen.

Mast Brothers has worked with The Paris Review, Ace Hotel, and other organizations to create collaborative products.

Mast Brothers: A Family Cookbook (by authors Rick and Michael Mast and a foreword by Thomas Keller) was published in October 2013 by Little, Brown & Company. The book was the winner of the 2014 IACP Award for single subject and a 2014 James Beard award finalist for photography.

== Awards and recognition ==
The company has gained attention both for the quality of its packaging design as well as for its chocolate, including praise from French Laundry chef Thomas Keller.

== See also ==
- List of bean-to-bar chocolate manufacturers
