= Melanger =

Stone-grinder used to make chocolate

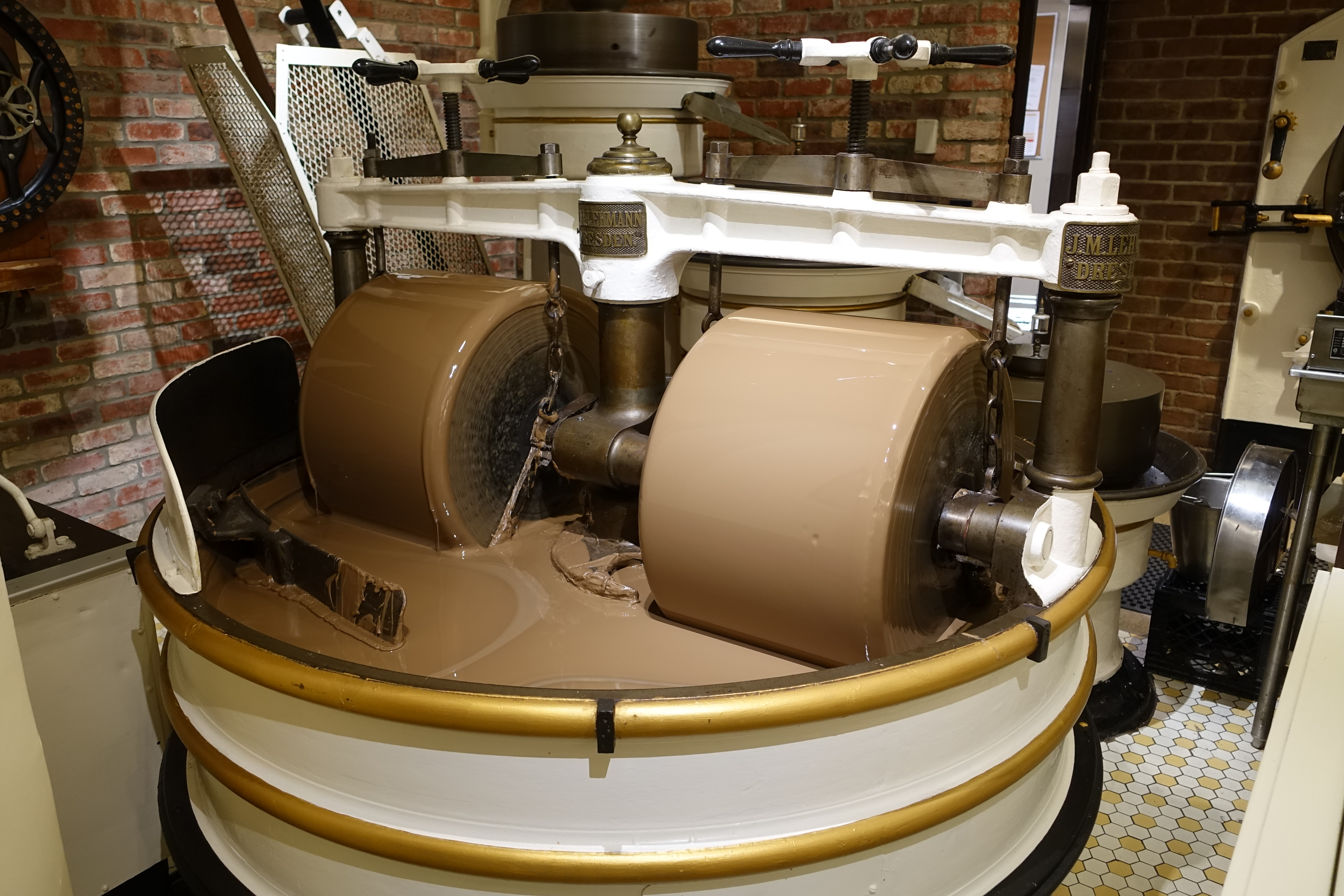
A melanger used to make chocolate

A melanger (or melangeur, from French: mélangeur, lit. "blender") is a stone-grinder that is used in chocolate-making. It typically consists of two granite wheels, which rotate inside a metal drum on top of a granite base. Given enough time the wheels can reduce the particles to sizes measured in microns, therefore making a smooth chocolate paste from cocoa beans.

Stone grinding tools have been widely used in history to make food. In Mesoamerica, cocoa was ground using a metate. Industrialization in the late 18th century favored the use of larger and water powered machines. The first melanger prototype was invented in 1811 by a French engineer named Poincelet. It was soon adopted all over Europe. In 1819, François Pelletier powered a grinder and a melanger with a steam engine. This allowed him to produce 76 kilos of chocolate in twelve hours, a quantity which typically required 7 workers at the time. In 1826, the melanger was also adopted (and perhaps further developed) by Philippe Suchard in his chocolate factory in Neuchâtel.

Nowadays melangers tend to be used by small chocolate manufacturers only. Melangers can be both used as refiners and conches.

Tabletop wet grinders are smaller versions of the melanger.

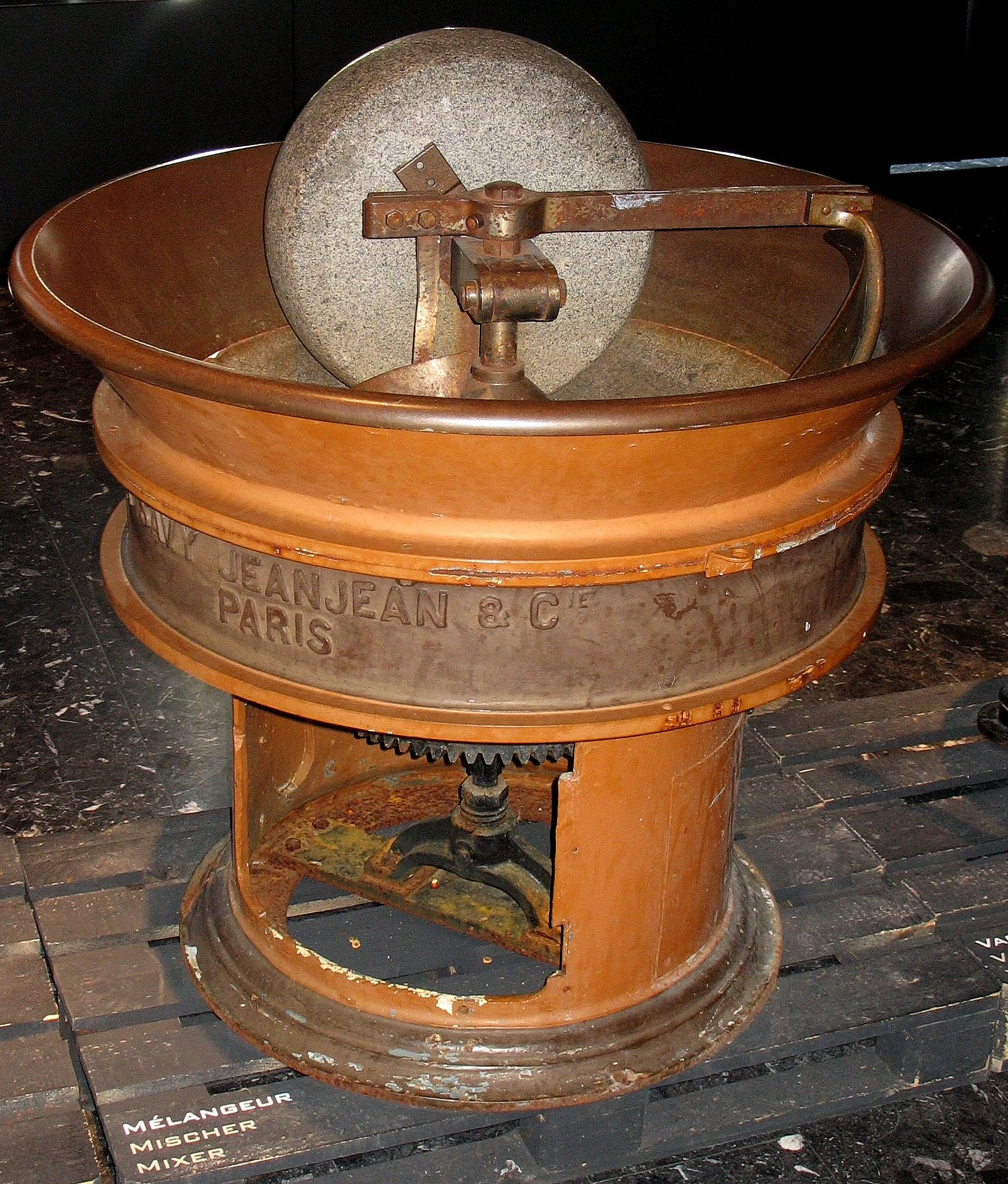
Antiquated melanger used in the Cailler factory

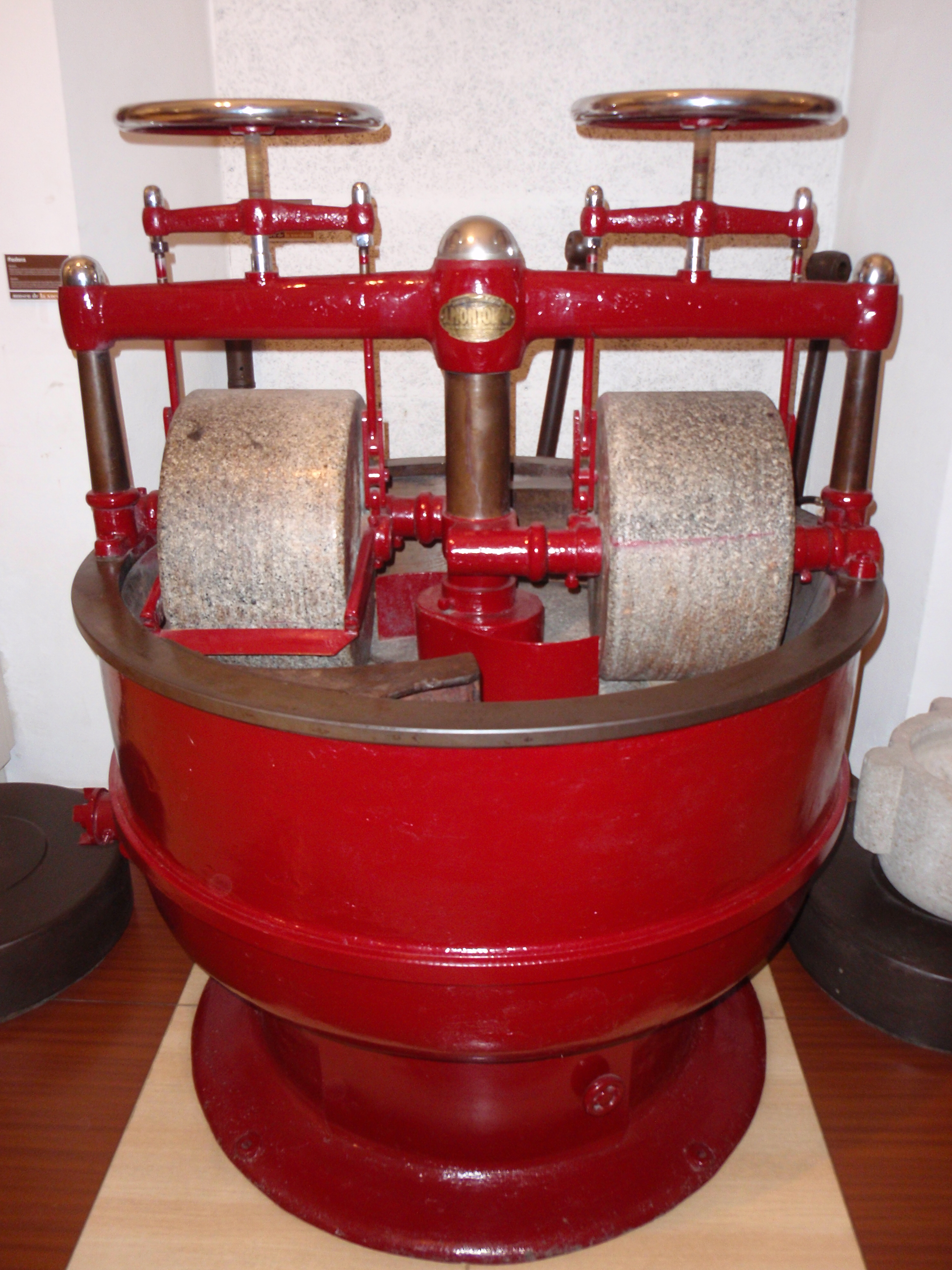
Antiquated melanger used in a Spanish factory

== See also ==
- Bean-to-bar
