= Mindo Chocolate Makers =

American chocolate company

- Company type: Private
- Founded: 2009
- Founders: Barbara Wilson; Joseph Meza
- Headquarters: Dexter, Michigan, United States
- Products: Bean‑to‑bar chocolate
- Owners: Barbara Wilson; Joseph Meza
- Website: mindochocolate.com

Mindo Chocolate Makers is a chocolate company founded in 2009 by Barbara Wilson and Joseph Meza. The company is based in Dexter, Michigan, with sourcing operations in Mindo, Ecuador.

== History ==
Mindo Chocolate Makers began in Barbara Wilson's home in Dexter, Michigan. The original chocolate tour and cacao sourcing were established in Mindo, Ecuador, through their sister company, El Quetzal de Mindo. In 2021, Mindo opened a second retail location in Kerrytown, Ann Arbor.

== See also ==
- List of bean-to-bar chocolate manufacturers
