= Ah Cacao Real Chocolate =

Mexican chocolate company

- Company type: Privately held company
- Industry: Confectionery production
- Founded: 2003; 23 years ago
- Headquarters: Playa del Carmen, Quintana Roo, Mexico
- Products: Chocolates
- Website: www.ahcacao.com

Ah Cacao Real Chocolate, SA de CV is a Mexican chocolate company based in Playa del Carmen, Quintana Roo, Mexico. The company was founded in 2003.

The company operates five retail stores in Mexico under the name Ah Cacao Chocolate Café. selling chocolate and coffee products.

The company financially supports wildlife conservation projects.

In 2008 Ah Cacao Chocolate Café was featured on Rachael Ray's Tasty Travels, a Food Network TV show.

In 2012 Ah Cacao was recognized as a "socially responsible company" (Empresa Socialmente Responsible) by Centro Mexicano para la Filantropía A.C. (CEMEFI/Mexican Center for Philanthropy)

The Beans from Ah Cacao Cafe are from the Southern Mexican state of Chiapas.

== See also ==
- List of bean-to-bar chocolate manufacturers
