= Rose McAdoo =

American chef, activist, and Antarctic facility manager

- Born: 1990 (age 35–36); Horseheads, New York
- Occupations: Pastry chef: Artist; Facility manager; Activist
- Awards: Grist 50 (2024); Saveur 100 (2020)

Rose McAdoo is an American chef, facility manager, glacier guide, artist, and activist who currently serves as the Facility Manager of the NASA Long Duration Balloon Facility at McMurdo Station. She is known for her baking, often described as "bake-tivism", which is often inspired by the polar climate and by the effects of climate change, and first went to McMurdo Station as a sous chef in 2019.

== Biography ==
McAdoo was raised in Horseheads, New York, in a family which was frequently visited by social workers and received culinary training through a dual-enrollment BOCES program. She then ran the pastry program at a resort in Arizona not long after graduation, before returning to New York State, where she ran a restaurant in Ithaca. She worked briefly in California before working in New York at places including Mast Brothers and Nine Cakes, where she learned cake designing on the job.

During her time in New York, her cakes became more politically active, providing desserts from various cultures to migrant farmworkers and holding workshops for prisoners at Rikers Island and the Los Angeles County state prison on storytelling through cake.

On New Years Eve 2018, she began a position in Antarctica at McMurdo Station as a sous chef, where she worked for two seasons. During one of her trips down, she used most of her luggage allotment for fondant. She soon began translating the scientific research that researchers were doing at that station into cakes. She has also made a series of sweets and baked goods from glacier-area ingredients in Alaska, of which some were published in Edible Communities's Edible Alaska. Many of the desserts she makes involve glacial runoff as an ingredient. She has stated her motivation for making these treats revolves around how "food makes everything more accessible", as well as her personally processing information through the lens of food.

During COVID, she began also working on the Search and Rescue team in Antarctica, and became a glacier guide in Alaska as well. By 2024, she had become the NASA Long Duration Balloon Facility's facility manager, and continues to bake glacier-inspired cakes.

She was ranked #34 on the Saveur 100 in 2020 and included in the Grist 50 in 2024.
