= Chocolala =

Estonian confectionery company

Chocolala OÜ
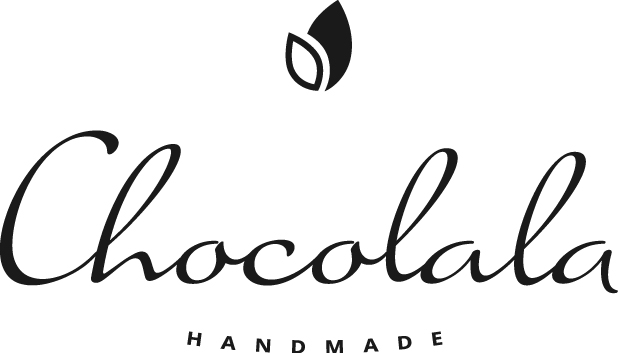
- Company type: Family owned
- Industry: Confectionery
- Founded: 2013; 13 years ago
- Headquarters: Tallinn, Harju County, Estonia
- Number of locations: Suur-Karja 20, Tallinn, Estonia
- Area served: Worldwide
- Key people: Kristi Lehtis, Founder
- Products: Chocolate
- Website: www.chocolala.ee

Chocolala OÜ is an Estonian confectionery company specialized in luxury handmade chocolate and small-batch, bean-to-bar products.

== History ==
Chocolala was founded in 2013 when a wife and husband, respectively lawyer and banker, decided to found a chocolate confectionery company in Tallinn, Estonia. According to the founders, the objective was to revive the Estonian luxury chocolate tradition, adapting existing recipes to modern tastes and inventing new ones using local Nordic ingredients.

The production started in June 2014, and it rapidly garnered a reputation for quality and innovation.

Chocolala was the first Estonian company to be Fair trade certified.

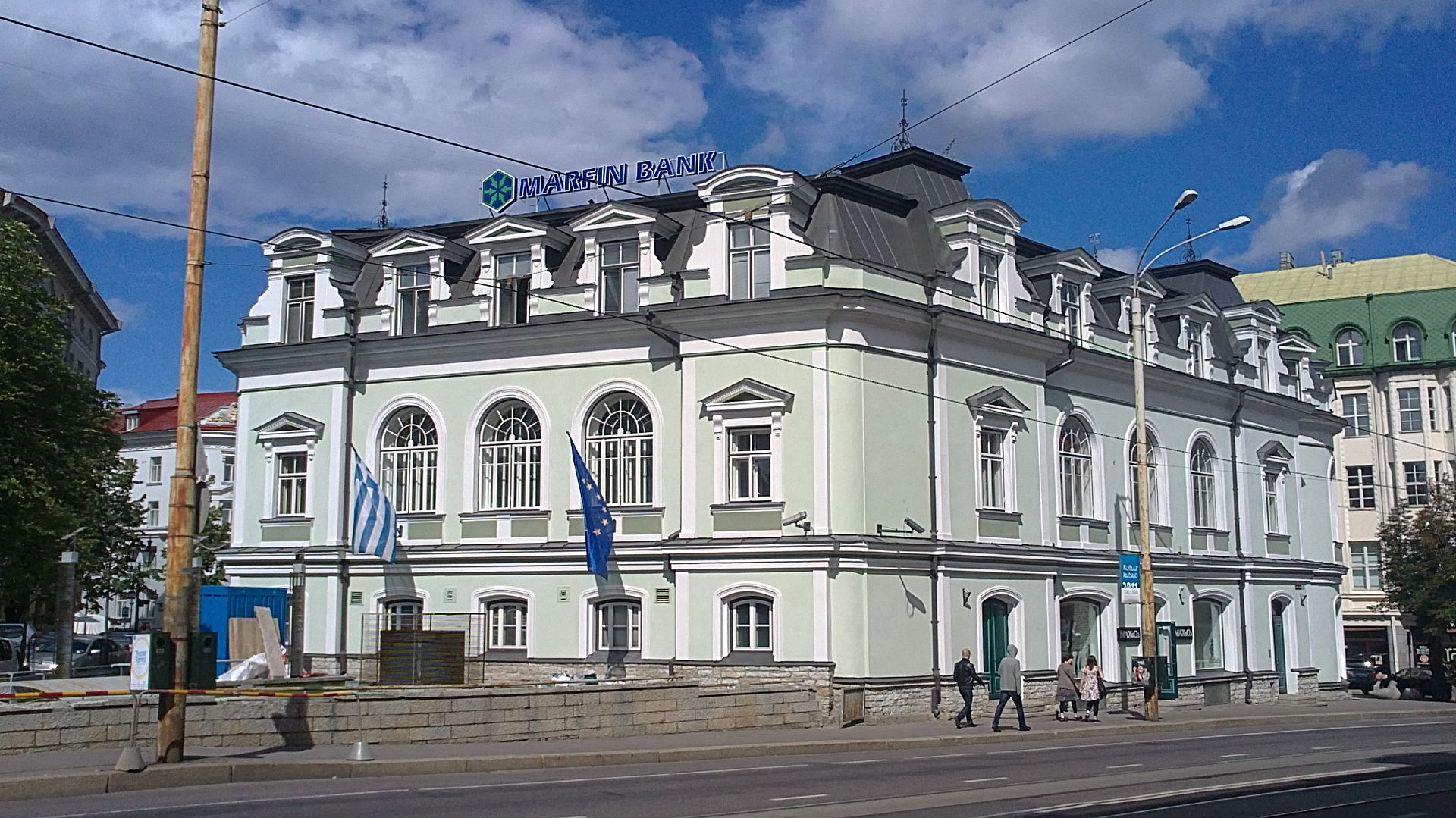
Chocolala Building on Suur-Karja 20, Tallinn, Estonia

In February 2018, the company moved its production and showcase shop to a historical building in Tallinn Old Town, near Freedom Square, Tallinn, Estonia. The building is located on Suur-Karja Street 20 / Pärnu Road 12. The Property was built in the years 1899–1900 by architects Rudolf von Engelhardt and Nikolai Thamm Jr. for Tallinn's German Club.

The Chocolala Chocolate Museum opened its doors in June 2018. The Museum collections cover Estonian chocolate makers for the period from 1806 to 1950s.

In 2018, Chocolala ranked as the second chocolate manufacturer in Estonia and the fourth chocolate company in the country overall

In 2019, the company launched its bean-to-bar products. In May 2019, it was certified to the food safety management standard ISO 22000-2018

== Products ==
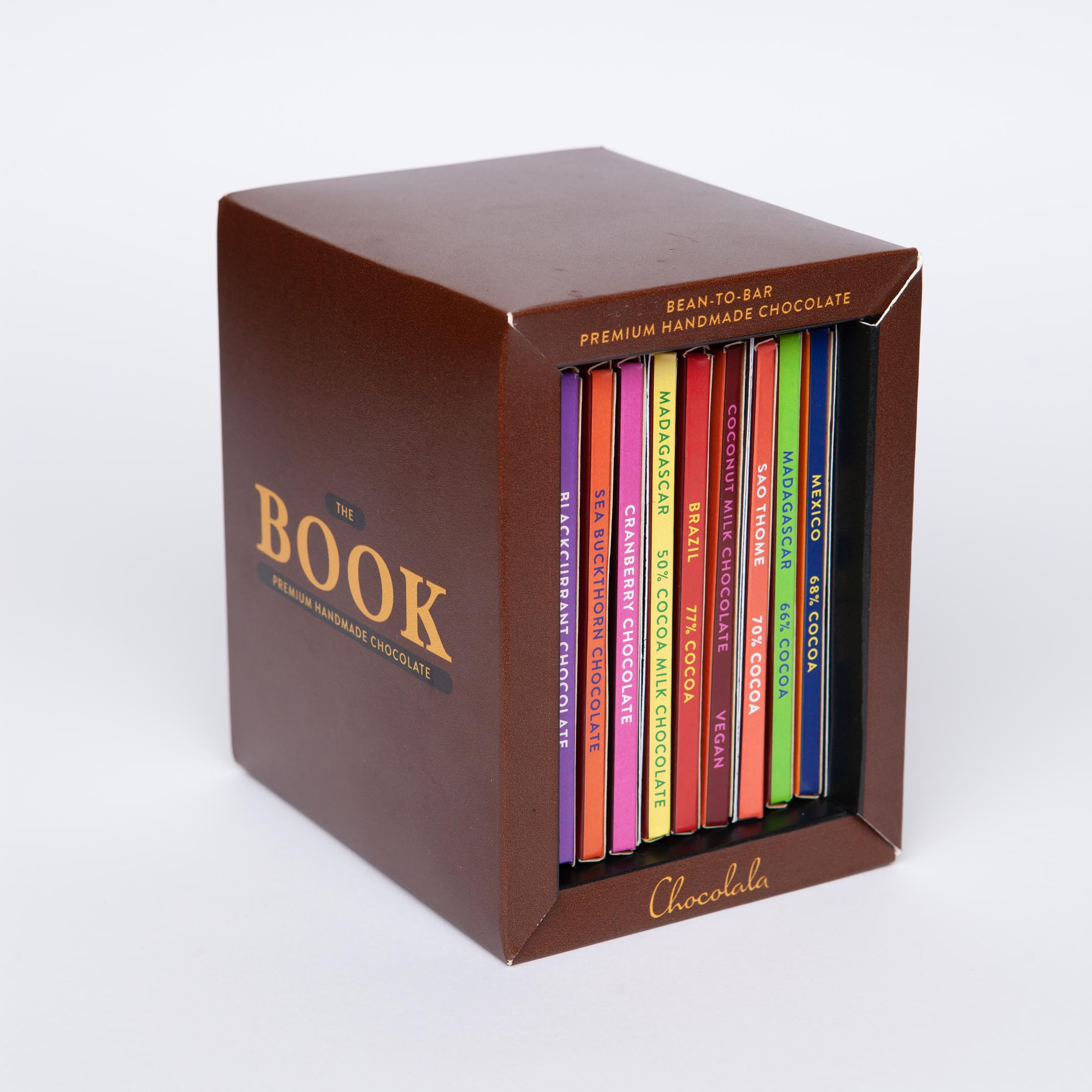
The Chocolala Bean-to-Bar Collection

The company products and recipes are influenced by the Estonian and Nordic culinary tradition with an important use of berries found typically in the Northern European forests, such as lingonberries, sea buckthorn, raspberry, bilberry, Juniper and blackcurrant.

Other Nordic ingredients used in their recipes are kama, a mixture of roasted barley, rye, oat and pea flour, typical in Finland, Estonia and Russia, but also local handcrafted gin, birch syrup, Vana Tallinn liqueur, spruce sprouts and reindeer moss.

Handmade and hand-painted chocolate figures are very popular products offered by the company.

== Awards and honors ==
- 3 awards in the International Chocolate Awards 2015 competition.
- Nominee for the best Estonian responsible company 2015.
- Top ten international chocolate shops 2016 by Fodor’s Travel.
- Best Estonian Food Awards 2016 for reindeer moss in chocolate.
- 2 International Chocolate Awards 2017
- 3 International Chocolate Awards 2018
- 3 International Chocolate Awards 2019.
- Estonian National Advertising Festival 2019 – Golden Egg Award.

== See also ==
- Chocolala Chocolate Museum
