= Q sweet =

Taiwanese chocolatier and dessert shop

Q sweet Q sweet 巧克力菁點
- Type: Private
- Industry: Chocolate / Confectionery
- Founded: 2015
- Headquarters: Taipei, Taiwan
- Key people: Queenie Wu (Chinese: 吳葵妮); Founder and chocolatier
- Products: Chocolate truffles, bars, gift boxes
- Website: qsweet.com.tw

Q sweet (Chinese: 巧克力菁點) is a chocolatier and dessert shop based in Taipei, Taiwan. It was founded in 2015 by Queenie Wu.

During the 2022 visit by Nancy Pelosi to Taiwan, the Ministry of Foreign Affairs gave her a Q sweet box of chocolates.

== See also ==
- List of bean-to-bar chocolate manufacturers
- Yu Chocolatier
- Fu Wan Chocolate
