= Chocolates El Rey =

Venezuelan chocolate manufacturer

- Industry: Chocolate
- Founded: Caracas, Venezuela (1929)
- Website: chocolateselrey.com

Chocolates El Rey is one of the oldest chocolate manufacturers in Venezuela. It has a strong reputation for quality in international markets, producing chocolates primarily using more expensive, rare cocoa beans than competitors. El Rey has faced decreased sales in the context of the crisis in Venezuela.

== History ==
Chocolates El Rey was founded in 1929. During the 1990s, the company invested in a hacienda in an effort to increase profitability by implementing experimental techniques to speed up cocoa bean production. The project failed, according to the CEO, when the land became occupied by Hugo Chávez supporters. In 1994, El Rey began exporting single-origin chocolate to the United States, soon following with exports to Europe and Japan. For many years, they were the only company in South America to engage international chocolate markets. In 1995, they opened a plant in Barquisimeto.

As of 2006, El Rey primarily served a domestic market, split into four segments: bulk products such as chocolate chips, chocolate powders for chocolate milk, custom made chocolate products for manufacturers of chocolate-flavored products (such as McDonald's ice cream), and chocolate bars. These were sold wholesale through distributors to customers such as supermarkets and bakeries. That year, the company sold 3,000 tons of chocolate worth US$13,600,000, a dominant position in the Venezuelan chocolate market.

During the 2000s, El Rey brought eleven cocoa processors into a partnership called Aprocao. Aprocao purchased beans for distribution and ran a research institute that looked at best cocoa production practices. Most of the beans El Rey purchased were rarer and more expensive.

In 2015, El Rey spent US$8,000,000 upgrading its factory in Barquisimeto, allowing it to meet all of their cocoa bean processing needs internally. At the same time, the company attempted to expand its exports, using its good reputation in overseas markets. This was necessary in the context of an unstable domestic market. The effects of this instability were apparent by 2018. Production had dropped to 820 tons of chocolate and sales were worth US$1,000,000. Investments in the firm ceased as inflation devalued the Venezuelan currency. As of 2020, the situation had worsened further with the effects of the COVID-19 pandemic in Venezuela. Despite this, the company still held a very strong reputation for quality internationally, and were attempting to gain funding to expand the Venezuelan chocolate industry.

== Cacao Route ==
Chocolates El Rey runs tours of cacao farms, chocolate factories and chocolateries named the "Cacao Route", marketed to international chefs and food writers. The tours, which include cultural performances related to cocoa, market the company and Venezuela more broadly.

== See also ==
- List of bean-to-bar chocolate manufacturers
