= Pacari Chocolate =

Ecuadorian chocolate company

- Company type: Privately held company
- Industry: Chocolate production
- Founded: 2002
- Founder: Santiago Peralta & Carla Barboto
- Headquarters: Quito, Julio Zaldumbide N25-24 y Miravalle, Ecuador
- Area served: Worldwide
- Products: Chocolate Bars, Nibs, Beans
- Website: www.pacari.com

Pacari Chocolate is a chocolate company in Quito, Ecuador.

== History ==
Pacari Chocolate was founded as a family business in 2002 by Santiago Peralta and Carla Barbotó, who own and operate the company. The company name 'Pacari' comes from the Quechua word meaning 'nature'. The chocolate is stated to be dairy, soy, chemical, transgenic and gluten free.

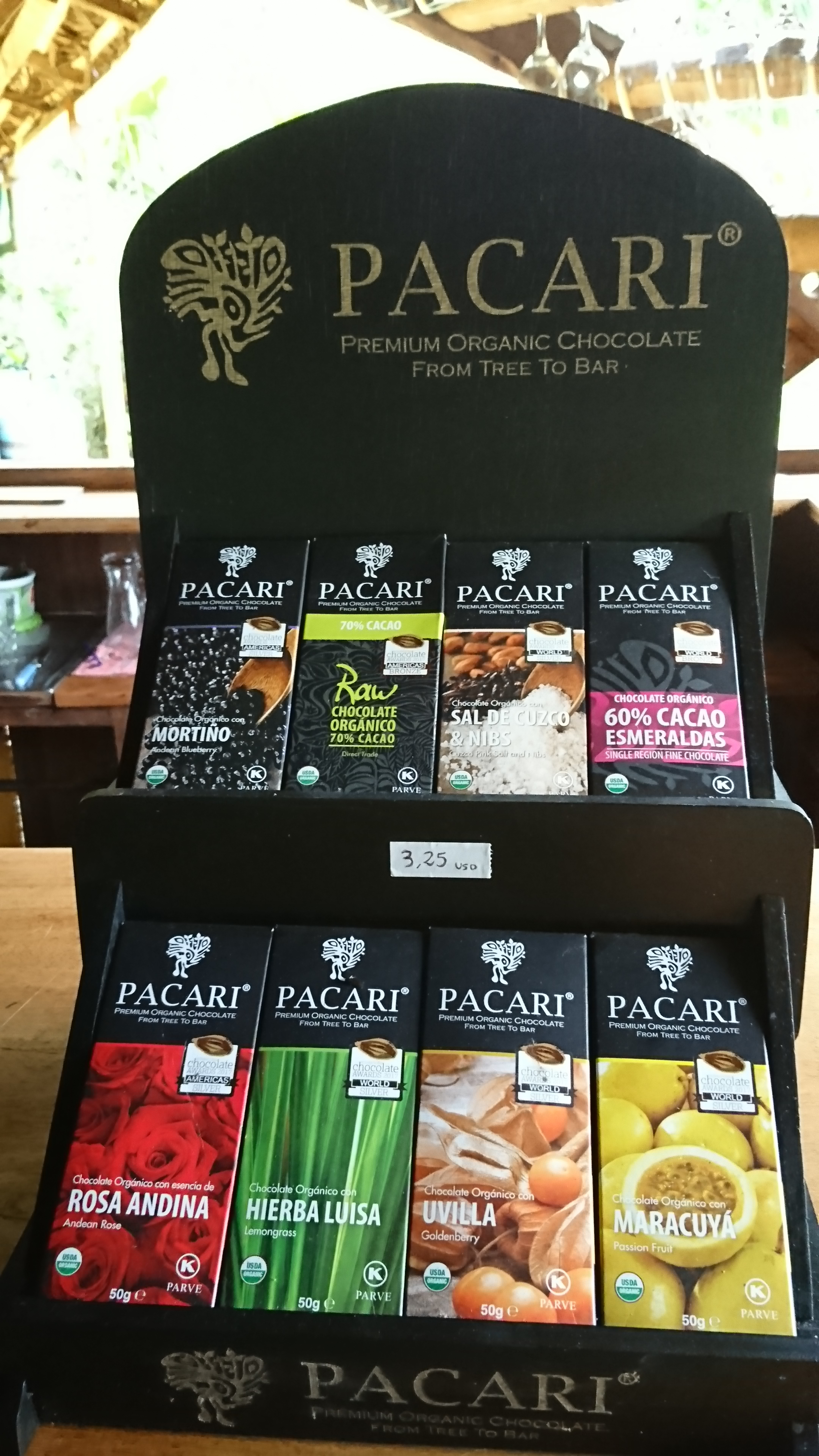
Pacari chocolate packets

Pacari Chocolate is the first chocolate company to receive a biodynamic certification from Demeter International. Pacari Chocolate products are available in health food and luxury chocolate outlets in the United States, Europe, South America and Malaysia.

=== International Chocolate Awards – World Final ===
Year	Nominee / work	Award	Result
2013	Pacari Chocolate – Piura-Quemazon	Overall Winner – Gold	Won
2013	Pacari Chocolate – 70% Raw Bar	Overall Winner – Silver	Won
2012	Pacari Chocolate – 70% Raw Bar	Overall Winner – Gold	Won
2012	Pacari Chocolate – 70% Piura-Quemazon	Overall Winner – Silver	Won
2012	Pacari Chocolate – 60% Cacao with Lemongrass	Flavored Dark Chocolate – Gold	Won
2012	Pacari Chocolate – Raw 70% Chocolate Bar With Salt And Cacao Nibs	Flavored Dark Chocolate – Silver	Won
2012	Pacari Chocolate – Raw 70% Chocolate Bar with Maca	Flavored Dark Chocolate – Silver	Won

– Sources:

== See also ==
- List of bean-to-bar chocolate manufacturers
