= List of bean-to-bar chocolate manufacturers =

A bean-to-bar company produces chocolate by processing cocoa beans into a product in-house, rather than melting chocolate from another manufacturer. They operate on a small scale (generally producing batches of chocolate smaller than 500 kilograms (1,100 lb)) without lecithin or vanilla. They use specialty cocoa, attempting to highlight the natural flavors of the bean.

== Bean-to-bar chocolate manufacturers ==
Company	Location	Year founded	Products	Notes
Ah Cacao Real Chocolate	Mexico	2003	Single origin chocolate bars	Artisan producer of dark chocolate and related products made of Mexican cacao. Supports wildlife conservation.
Amano Artisan Chocolate	United States	2006	Single origin chocolate (bars, couverture), cocoa nibs	Founding member of the Craft Chocolate Makers of America. The Madagascar bar and the Dos Rios Palet d'or have received gold medals from the London Academy of Chocolate.
Amedei	Italy	1990		Amedei is a luxury chocolate manufacturing company located in Pontedera in the Tuscany region of Italy.
Askinosie Chocolate	United States	2007	Single origin chocolate bars (dark, dark milk, white), single origin natural cocoa powder, roasted cocoa nibs	Utilizes direct trade, paying farmers above fair trade prices for cocoa beans and sharing profit with them. One of the only small-batch chocolate makers in the US to press their own cocoa butter.
Bonnat Chocolates	France	1884	More than 40 single origin bars	Bonnat Chocolatier.
Cailler	Switzerland	1819	Large variety of chocolate bars, including Branche since 1904, and praline boxes	Founded in Vevey in 1819 by François-Louis Cailler, oldest factory in Switzerland. Owned by Nestlé since 1929
Castronovo Chocolate	United States	2012	Chocolate bars using single-origin cacao from Latin America, roasted cocoa nibs and truffles	Multiple awards from the International Chocolate Awards and the Academy of Chocolate. Castronovo uses heirloom beans from Latin America.
Choco Togo	Togo	2014	Chocolate bars, hot chocolate, chocolate cake, and other chocolate products	The first chocolate manufacturer in Togo.
Chocolala	Estonia	2013	Single origin chocolate bars (dark, dark milk, coconut milk, sugar-free), roasted cocoa nibs	A small-batch chocolate maker.
Domori	Italy	1997		Domori is a premium chocolate company headquartered near Turin.
Chocolates El Rey	Venezuela	1929		El Rey uses only Venezuelan cacao, fermented and sun dried, and processed locally.
Friis-Holm	Denmark	2007		
Fu Wan Chocolate	Taiwan	2015	Single-origin dark chocolates, Fermented and specialty bars combining cocoa with local flavors (e.g., lychee, tea, shrimp), Drinking chocolate, Limited editions based on Taiwanese terroir	
Haigh's Chocolates	Australia	1915		Haigh's is the oldest family-owned chocolate manufacturing retailer in Australia.
Hotel Chocolat	United Kingdom	2003	A variety of chocolate bars and filled chocolates, collections of single origin and single plantation chocolate as well as a range of savoury cocoa products	Company began as an online only service, before moving into the retail market. Company also owns a cocoa plantation on St Lucian (The Rabot Estate). Hotel Chocolat has an "Engaged Ethics" program in St Lucia and Ghana, seeking to provide farmers with a fair price and necessary support.
Malagos Chocolate	Philippines	2012	Single origin chocolate bars, cocoa liquor	
Mast Brothers	United States	2007	Chocolate bars, chocolate beer, and chocolate confections	Mast Brothers is a small manufacturer with flagships in Brooklyn, London, and most recently Los Angeles.
Michel Cluizel	France	1948		Michel Cluizel has been a manufacturer of high-quality chocolate in the French town of Damville in Normandy since 1948, and also has a store in Paris.
Mindo Chocolate Makers	United States; Ecuador	2009	chocolate bars, baking chocolate, cocoa powder, cocoa mass, raw whole beans, nibs	Member of the Craft Chocolate Makers of America. A micro-batch bean to bar chocolate maker which ferments and roasts beans. Practices Direct Trade.
Pacari Chocolate	Ecuador	2002	Raw whole beans, nibs, chocolate bars, baking chocolate, cocoa powder, cacao butter, and other chocolate covered products	First chocolate company to receive biodynamic certification. Cacao is produced using fair trade practices in Ecuador. Products are certified Kosher and Organic.
Patric Chocolate	United States	2006	Craft chocolate maker of bean-to-bar products. The product line includes dark chocolate bars, milk chocolate bars, and chocolate bars with inclusions.	Winners of the 2016 Good Food Awards in the chocolate category.
Q sweet	Taiwan	2019	Chocolate truffles, bars, gift boxes	
Rebisco	Philippines	1963	Choco Mucho	Founded in 1963 as a small bakery. Chocolate production since 2006.
Rick Jordan Chocolatier	United States	2011	Organic, fair trade, bean-to-bar chocolates and confections	Winner of Dessert Professional Top Ten Chocolatiers of North America 2012.
Rogue Chocolatier	United States	2007	Single-source	Shut down in 2019.
Roshen	Ukraine	1996	Chocolate bars, candy, chocolate cakes, etc.	Owned by the former president of Ukraine.
Scharffen Berger	United States	1996	Chocolate bars, varieties of dark chocolate	Purchased by Hershey in 2005; the original Berkeley, California factory closed in 2009.
Taza Chocolate	United States	2006	Bean-to-bar organic, stone ground chocolate	
TCHO Chocolate	United States	2005		Bean-to-bar chocolate factory. Has a program called TCHOSource where they partner with bean farmers to help them improve the quality of their crops and to process their beans more effectively.
Theo Chocolate	United States	2006		Bean-to-bar chocolate factory. The first chocolate manufacturer in the US to be both 100 percent organic and fair-trade.
Tony's Chocolonely	Netherlands	2005	Over a dozen flavours in four sizes, plus seasonal items	Founded in 2005 by Dutch journalist Teun van de Keuken after learning of the horrors of the commercial cocoa industry on his show Keuringsdienst van Waarde. After three years of unsuccessful attempts to change the industry through investigative efforts, Van de Keuken decided to start producing chocolate bars himself. The brand was called "Tony's Chocolonely" with "Tony" (= Teun) and "Chocolonely" in reference to Teun van de Keuken feeling as if he was the only person in the industry who was interested in eradicating slavery.
Venezuelan Black	United Kingdom	1998		Small producer of single estate 100% chocolate bars using Venezuelan cacao. The company's launch was televised as the series Willie's Wonky Chocolate Factory was aired in the United Kingdom during 2008.
Whittaker's	New Zealand	1896	Palm oil-free chocolate bars	Founded in Christchurch, currently based in Porirua.
Zotter Schokoladen Manufaktur	Austria	1999	More than 365 varieties of hand-scooped, filled chocolates, single origin chocolate bars, pralines, couvertures, cocoa nibs, dragees, cakes, ice cream and coffee	Award-winning chocolate, named "by far the most innovative chocolatier of all" amongst the world-best chocolate manufacturers by chocolate tester Georg Bernardini

=== Unsorted ===
- To'ak Chocolate

== See also ==
- Specialty foods
- List of candies
- List of chocolate bar brands
- List of confectionery brands
- Farm to fork
- Vertical integration
- Woodblock Chocolate
