= Choco Togo =

Togolese bean-to-bar chocolate manufacturer

Coordinates: 6°12′14.4″N 1°8′38.9″E

- Type: Cooperative
- Industry: Chocolate, food processing
- Founded: March 2014; 12 years ago
- Founder: Full list (10): Komi Agbokou; Gambah Labopou Kpante; Essowenam Kpenguie; Delia Carmen Diabangouaya; Koffi Mawufemo Apetoh; Den'ke Abiassi; Paul Ablanwoun Attikpo; Dzigbodi Edinam Afatchao; Pascaline Akakpo; Mansour Adedayo
- Headquarters: Lomé, Togo
- Key people: Management committee: Komi Agbokou (president); Gambah Labopou Kpante (secretary); Essowenam Kpenguie (treasurer); Supervisory committee: Delia Carmen Diabangouaya (president); Koffi Mawufemo Apetoh (rapporteur); Den'ke Abiassi (rapporteur)
- Website: www.chocotogo.com (in French)

Choco Togo is a Togolese bean-to-bar chocolate manufacturer. It is structured as a cooperative and produces chocolate from domestically grown cocoa beans. It was founded in 2014 by a group of Togolese entrepreneurs who had trained as chocolatiers in Italy. Most of its chocolate is sold locally at affordable prices, but a few sales have been made to international buyers. Chocolate bars produced by Choco Togo are unique in that they are heat resistant, able to withstand temperatures of up to 35 °C (95 °F).

== Founding ==
Choco Togo was established as part of an international project started by the European Union in 2013. The project, titled "Fair, Young, Sustainable, Inclusive, and Cooperative", aimed to "promote cooperative and inclusive thinking" among youth in Togo. Sixty Togolese youths were trained in entrepreneurial practices and cooperative living by the Enfant-Food-Développement association, with the support of Côte d'Ivoire, the Czech Republic, and Italy, the sponsor country. Six individuals from the larger group were then selected to travel to Sicily, Italy, for further training in chocolate making. During their time in Sicily, the trainees received instruction in cocoa processing, fair trade, tourism, and e-commerce. Upon returning to Togo, the trainees learned that domestic cocoa processing had not been attempted in the country since the colonial era, and most Togolese cocoa farmers did not know about chocolate. The trainees therefore decided to create a brand of "Made in Togo" chocolate and founded the Choco Togo cooperative in March 2014.

== Operations ==
At the beginning, Choco Togo was funded solely by its founders. The cooperative lacked the high-performance machines used in Sicily to produce high quality chocolate, and resorted to working with unsuitable equipment. However, these financial and equipment issues were alleviated in 2015, when Choco Togo won a number of entrepreneurial and agricultural awards which included millions of West African francs in prize money. Later that same year, the cooperative held the first chocolate fair in Togo, and received an order for 4,000 chocolate bars from Togo's Ministry of Posts and Digital Economy.

To source high-quality cocoa, Choco Togo tasked the Federation of Unions of Coffee-Cocoa Producers with identifying a domestic cocoa producer with organic certification. A producer representing 1,500 smallhold farmers in Akébou Prefecture was selected. Once harvested, the cocoa is transported to Kpalimé, Akébou Prefecture, where forty local women perform the initial processing, which includes sorting, roasting, shelling, and grinding. The resulting powder is then sent to Lomé, where it is refined into chocolate paste. The paste is tempered and molded into chocolate bars, most of which are sold locally at affordable prices. However, Choco Togo also sells chocolate to Asky Airlines and at one point exported 2.2 tonnes of cocoa beans to Japan.

== Community projects ==
Choco Togo runs a community development project called Chocoland, which uses the cooperative's mutual savings and microcredits to fund the development of a cocoa farming community in Danyigan, a village in southwest Togo. In 2018, the cooperative expressed its goal of building a health center in the village to reduce the local maternal and infant mortality rates.

== Organisation ==
Choco Togo is a member of the Association of Coffee-Cocoa Processors in Togo, which is part of the Interprofessional Council of the Coffee-Cocoa Subsidiary. This council includes producers, exporters, buyers, and consumers.

== Products ==
Choco Togo's chocolate bars have a rough texture that makes them heat resistant. They can withstand temperatures of up to 35 °C (95 °F), allowing them to be sold by market stallholders in the tropical climate of Togo, which has a temperature range of 22 to 32 °C (72 to 90 °F). In 2016, the price of an 80-gram (2.8 oz) bar was 1,000 West African francs, or about 1.5 euros. Aside from chocolate bars, the cooperative also sells various derivative products, such as hot chocolate, chocolate cake, and other confectionaries. Choco Togo's chocolate is fair trade certified.
