= Valrhona =

French premium chocolate company

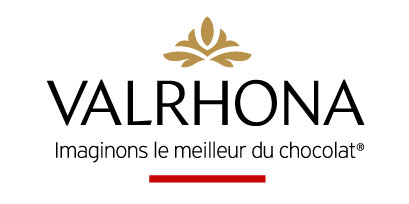
- Type: Subsidiary
- Industry: Confectionery production
- Founded: 1922
- Founder: Alberic Guironnet
- Headquarters: Tain-l'Hermitage, France
- Area served: Worldwide
- Products: Chocolates
- Number of employees: 500–999 (2020)
- Parent: Savencia Fromage & Dairy
- Website: www.valrhona.com

Valrhona is a French premium chocolate manufacturer based in the small town of Tain-l'Hermitage in Hermitage, a wine-growing district near Lyon. It is now a subsidiary of Savencia Fromage & Dairy. The company was founded in 1922 by a French pastry chef, Albéric Guironnet, from the Rhône valley and has five subsidiaries and 60 local distributors across the globe. It is one of the leading producers of gastronomic chocolate in the world. The company also maintains the École du Grand Chocolat, a school for professional chefs with a focus on chocolate-based dishes and pastries. In 2015 Valrhona opened the École Valrhona Brooklyn, a pastry school in Brooklyn; there are also two Écoles Valrhona in France and one in Japan.

Valrhona focuses mainly on high-grade luxury chocolate marketed for commercial use by chefs as well as for private consumption. The product line includes chocolate confectionery, plain and flavored chocolate bars and bulk chocolate in bars or pellets. Valrhona produces vintage chocolate made from beans of a single year's harvest from a specific plantation, primarily the Grand Crus which is grown in South America, Oceania and the Caribbean. The company has been B Corp–certified since January 2020.

At Valrhona, chocolate is ground to 14/15 μm during the refining phase of chocolate making.

== See also ==
- List of bean-to-bar chocolate manufacturers

== Sources ==
- Bau, Frédéric (2008). Chocolate Fusion: Chocolate in Cuisine (2nd English ed.). Montagud Editores. ISBN 978-84-7212-117-1.
