= Castronovo Chocolate =

American craft chocolate maker

- Type: Chocolate maker
- Industry: Chocolate
- Founded: 2012; 14 years ago in Stuart, Florida, United States
- Founders: Denise and Jim Castronovo
- Headquarters: Stuart, Florida, United States
- Area served: International
- Key people: Denise and Jim Castronovo
- Products: Chocolate (micro-batch)
- Website: castronovochocolate.com

Castronovo Chocolate is a micro-batch chocolate maker headquartered in Stuart, Florida.

== History ==
Denise and Jim Castronovo launched Castronovo Chocolate in 2012 in Stuart, Florida. Castronovo Chocolate sources cacao beans from remote rainforests which are harvested by indigenous people.

== Products ==
Castronovo Chocolate imports sustainably harvested heirloom cacao beans from Central America and South America for the manufacturing of single-origin chocolate bars. The chocolate maker produces and sells chocolate bars to specialty retail shops internationally.

== Recognition ==
In 2021 Castronovo was recognized for their dark chocolate by Food & Wine Magazine as among the country's top fifty chocolate makers.

== See also ==
- List of bean-to-bar chocolate manufacturers
