= Bonnat Chocolates =

French chocolate manufacturer

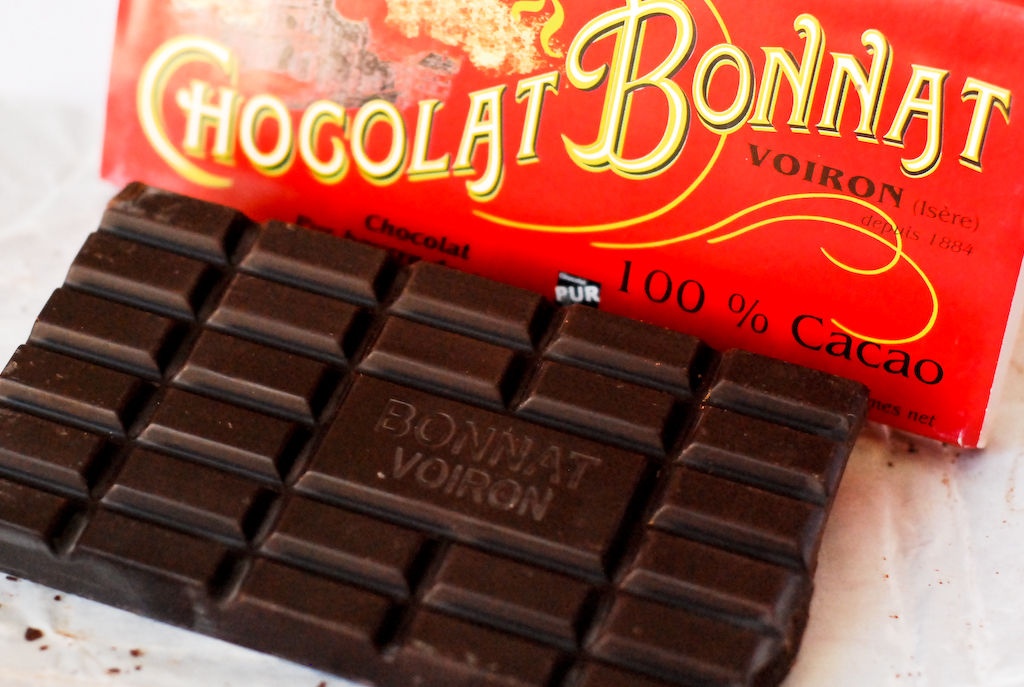
- A tablet of Bonnat 100% chocolate
- Formation: 1884
- Founder: Felix Bonnat
- Founded at: Voiron, France
- Website: bonnat-chocolatier.com/en

Chocolat Bonnat, also known as Bonnat Chocolatier, is a French chocolate manufacturer based in the small town of Voiron. Established in 1884 by Felix Bonnat, the business has been handed down from generation to generation. As of 2025, the Maitre-Chocolatier is Stéphane Bonnat.

== See also ==
- List of bean-to-bar chocolate manufacturers
