= Conching =

Process for refining chocolate by stirring at high temperature

Conche (in the Imhoff-Schokoladenmuseum)

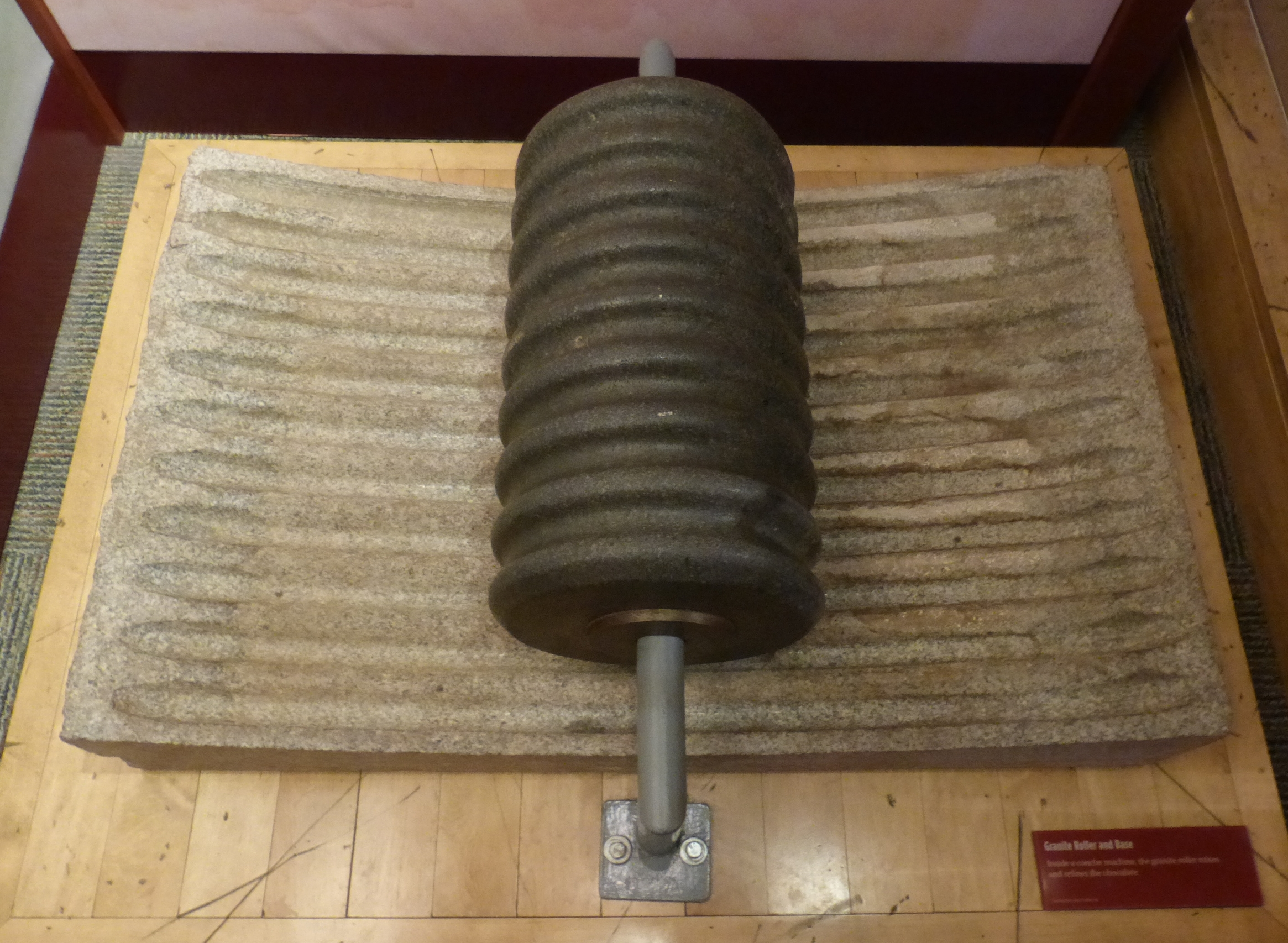
Granite roller and granite base of a conche

Conching is a process used in the manufacture of chocolate whereby a surface scraping mixer and agitator, known as a conche, evenly distributes cocoa butter within chocolate and may act as a "polisher" of the particles. It also promotes flavor development through frictional heat, release of volatiles and acids, and oxidation. The name arises from the shape of the vessels initially used which resembled conch shells.

When ingredients are mixed in this way, sometimes for up to 78 hours, chocolate can be produced with a mild, rich taste. The duration of conching is highly dependent on batch size and the type of equipment used; modern industrial conching of multi-tonne batches can be completed in under 12 hours, whereas traditional methods for large batches may take several days. Since the process is so important to the final texture and flavor of chocolate, manufacturers keep the details of their conching process proprietary.

The conching technique was introduced in Switzerland in the late 19th century. Conched chocolates were distinguished from ordinary chocolates with the French adjective fondant or crémant.

== History ==
Rodolphe Lindt invented the conche in Bern in 1879. It produced chocolate with superior aroma and melting characteristics compared to other processes used at that time. The Lindt chocolate company states that Lindt (perhaps mistakenly) allowed a mixer containing chocolate to run over a weekend (or possibly overnight, according to other variants of the possibly apocryphal story). Upon returning to the device, Lindt recognised the final product to have a smoother texture and greater shine than conventionally processed chocolate of the time. Lindt's invention made the mass-production of chocolate bars more practical, eventually replacing chocolate beverages as the primary means of mass chocolate consumption. The adoption of conching also generalized the use of additional cocoa butter in the chocolate production; until then, molded chocolate often simply consisted of cocoa mass and sugar. The chocolate was also moulded into thinner tablets rather than blocks. This new chocolate came to be known as chocolat fondant, or "melting chocolate". Although the term eventually fell out of use, it is still sometimes used in Europe to refer to dark chocolate.

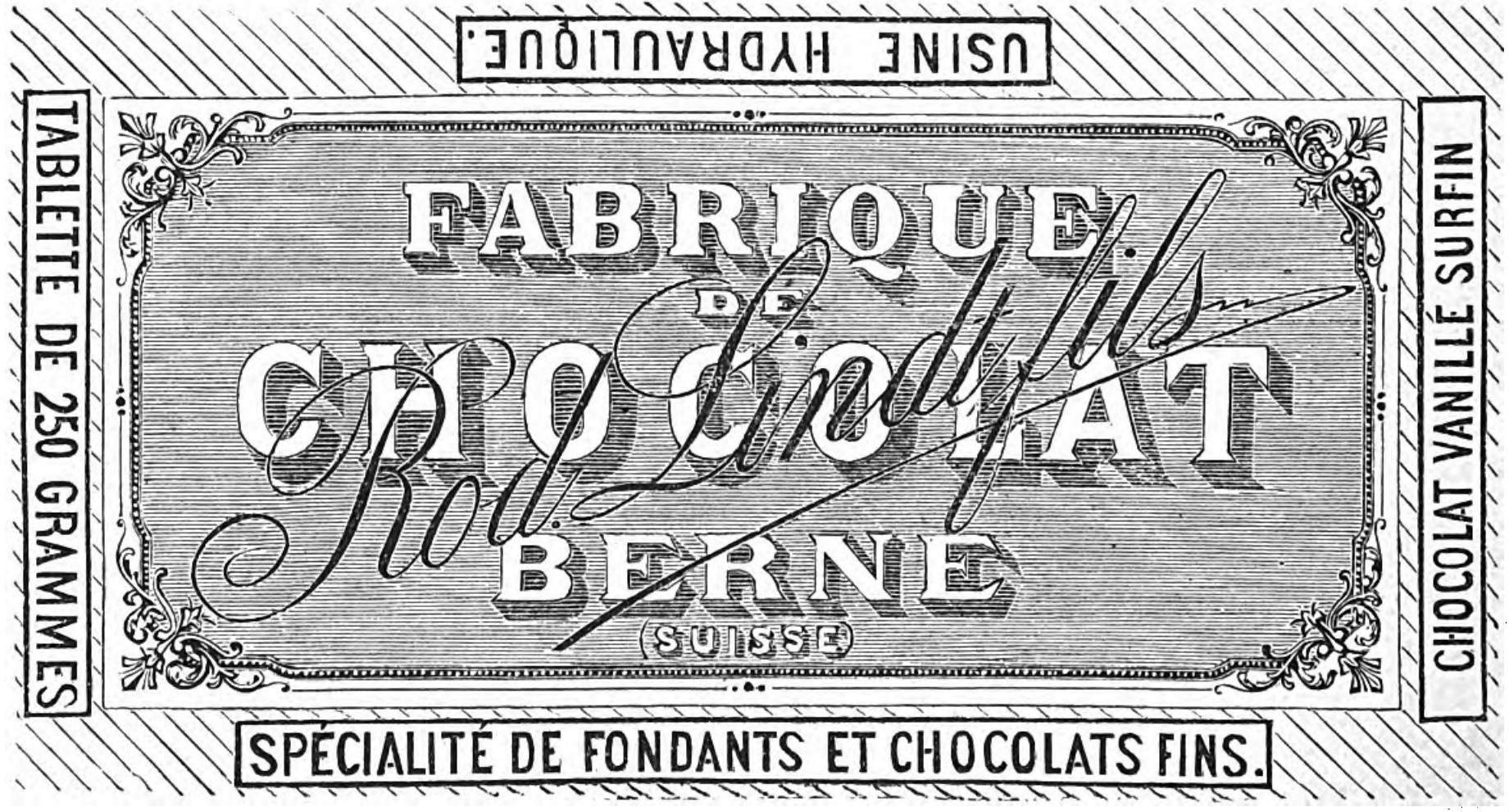
A Lindt bar in the 1880s

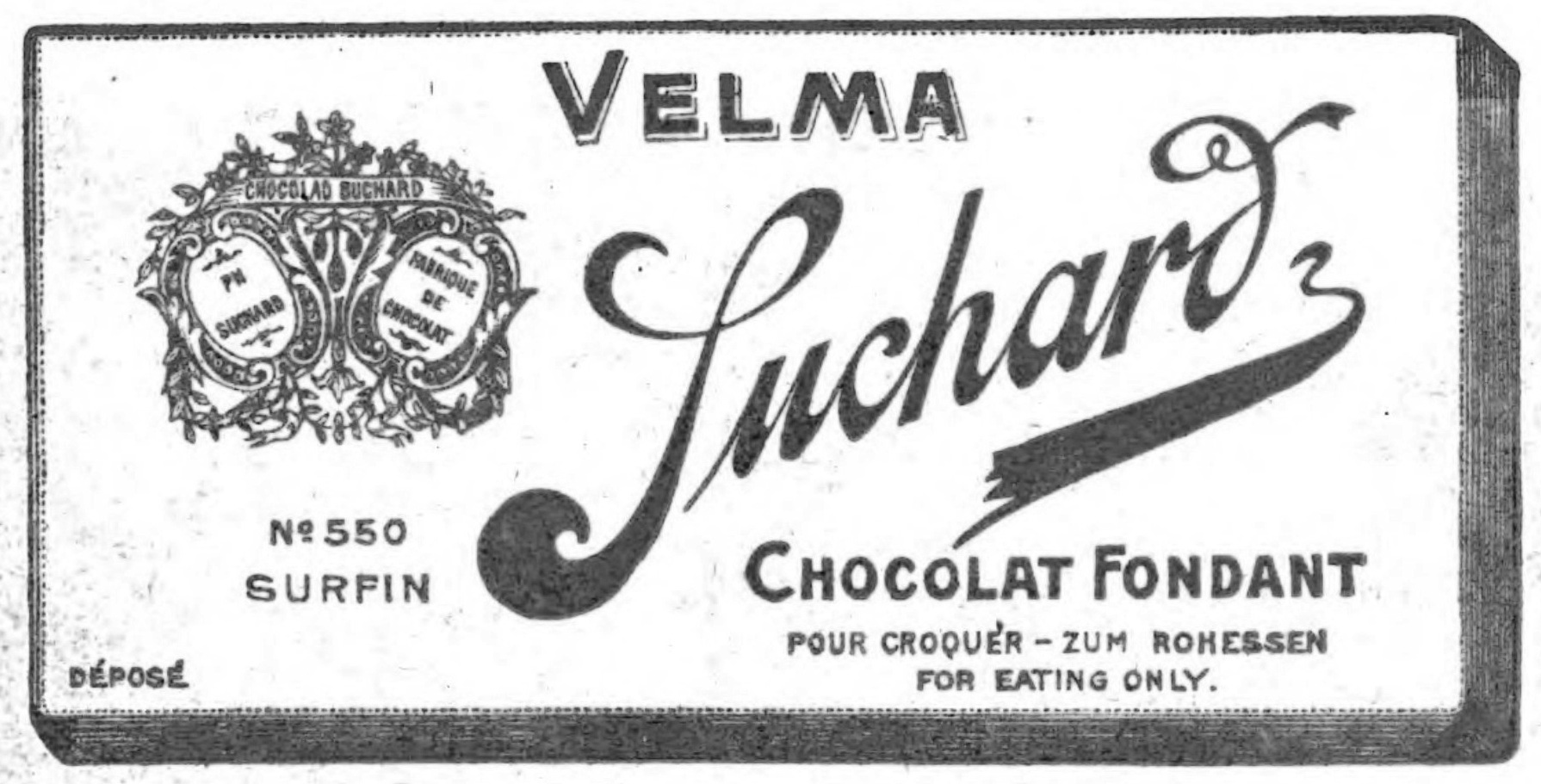
A Suchard bar in the 1900s

The original machine used by Lindt was developed in the early 1800s by an Italian chocolatier named Bozelli. The Bozelli grinding process was based on ancient Mesoamerican practices of grinding cocoa beans on curved stones, which were called metates.

Lindt's original conche consisted of a granite roller and granite trough; such a configuration is now called a "long conche" and can take more than a day to process a tonne of chocolate. The ends of the trough were shaped to allow the chocolate to be thrown back over the roller at the end of each stroke, increasing the surface area exposed to air. A modern rotary conche can process 3 to 10 tonnes of chocolate in less than 12 hours. Modern conches have cooled jacketed vessels containing long mixer shafts with radial arms that press the chocolate against vessel sides. A single machine can carry out all the steps of grinding, mixing, and conching required for small batches of chocolate.

The conching process remained mostly a trade secret until the end of the century. In the 1890s, Cailler launched a similar chocolate. A long conche was manufactured by J. M. Lehmann from 1899. Conching became a standard process in the chocolate industry by the 1920s.

== Process ==
Conching redistributes non-fat solids from cocoa, sugar and milk (that create flavor) into the fat phase from cocoa and milk fat. Air flowing through the conche removes some unwanted acetic, propionic, and butyric acids from the chocolate and reduces moisture. Even a small amount of moisture greatly increases the viscosity of the finished chocolate, so machinery is cleaned with cocoa butter instead of water. Some of the substances produced in the roasting of cocoa beans are oxidized in the conche, mellowing the flavor of the product.

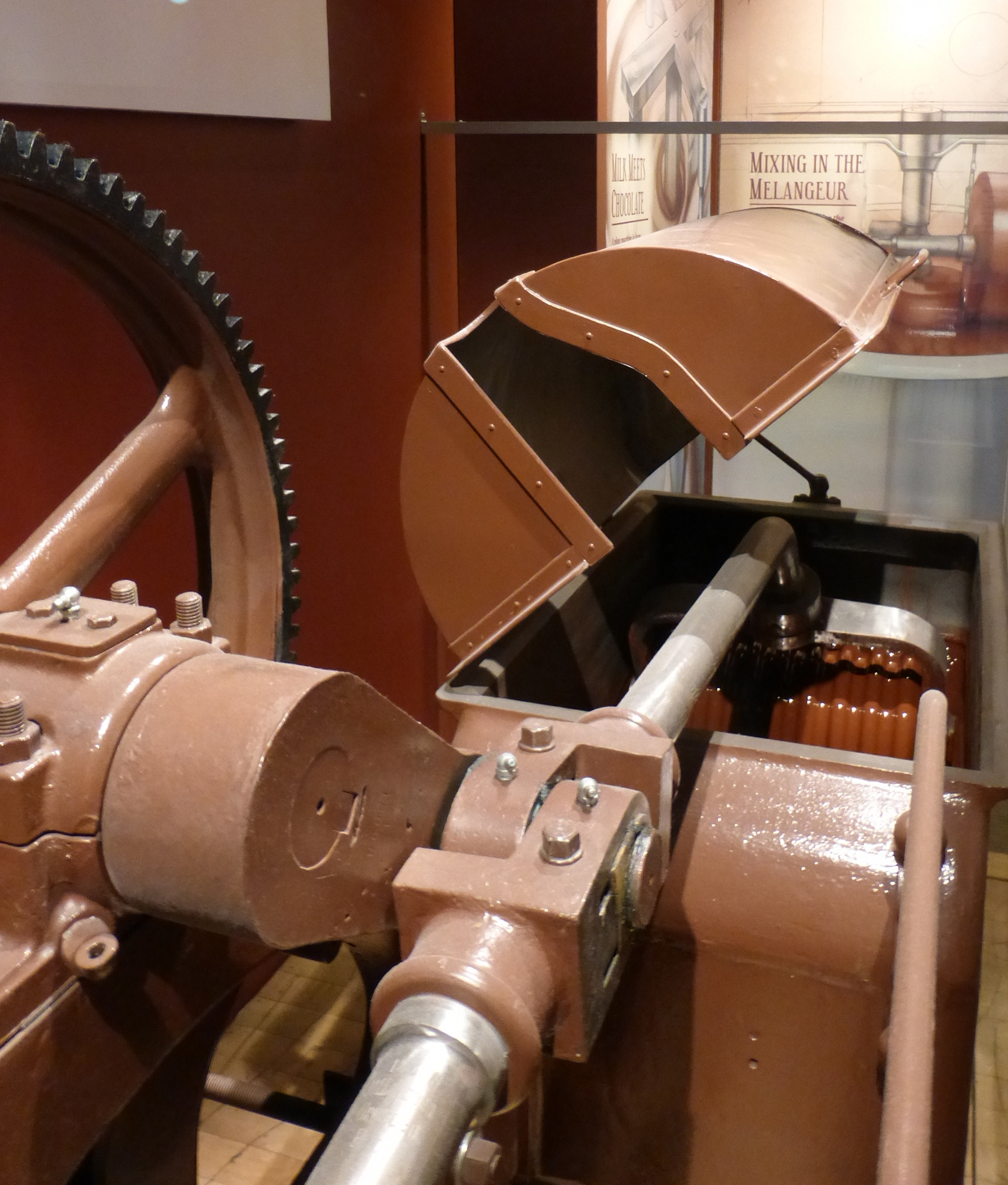
A Hershey conche from the early 1900s, on display as part of the Hershey Story collection

The temperature of the conche is controlled and varies for different types of chocolate. Generally, higher temperature leads to a shorter required processing time. Temperature varies from around 49 °C (120 °F) for milk chocolate to up to 82 °C (180 °F) for dark chocolate. The elevated temperature leads to a partially caramelized flavor and in milk chocolate promotes the Maillard reaction.

The chocolate passes through three phases during conching. In the dry phase the material is in powdery form, and the mixing coats the particles with fat. Air movement through the conche removes some moisture and volatile substances, which may give an acidic note to the flavor. Moisture balance affects the flavor and texture of the finished product because, after the particles are coated with fat, moisture and volatile chemicals are less likely to escape.

In the pasty phase more of the particles are coated with the fats from the cocoa. The power required to turn the conche shafts increases at this step.

The final liquid phase allows minor adjustment to the viscosity of the finished product by addition of fats and emulsifiers, depending on the intended use of the chocolate.

While most conches are batch-process machines, continuous-flow conches separate the stages with weirs, over which the product travels through separate parts of the machine. A continuous conche can reduce the conching time for milk chocolate to as little as four hours.

After conching is completed, the flavor continues to change as it tastes increasingly acidic.

== See also ==
- Melanger
- History of chocolate

== Sources ==
- Giller, Megan (2015). "Rogue Chocolatier: Why You've Never Heard Of The Best Chocolate Maker In America". Chocolate Noise. Archived from the original on September 14, 2024.
