= Couverture chocolate =

Chocolate with more cocoa butter

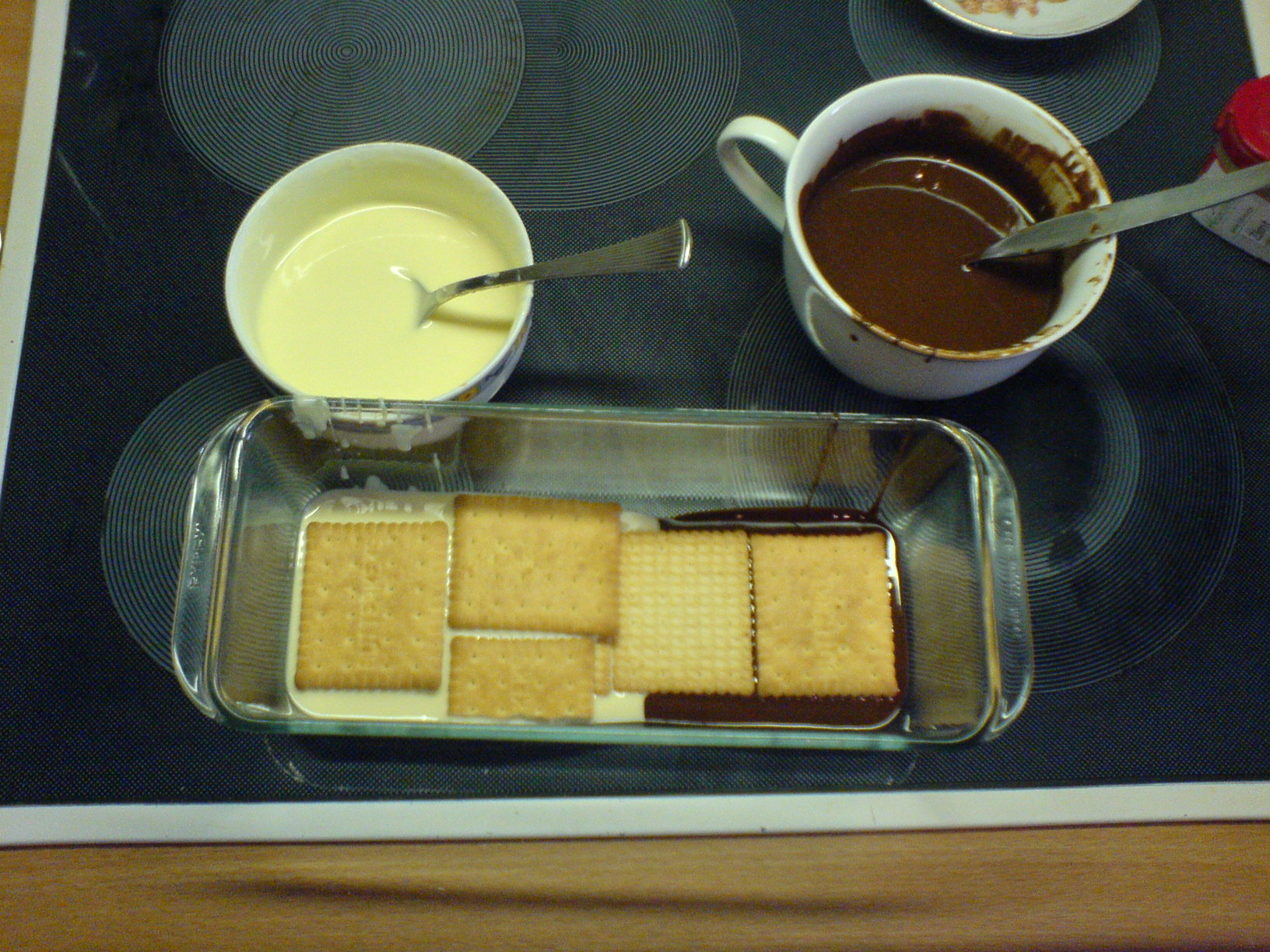
- Warmed couverture chocolate for baking
- Type: Chocolate
- Main ingredients: Chocolate liquor, cocoa butter, sugar

Couverture chocolate (/ˈkuː.vər.tʃʊər/) is a chocolate that contains a higher percentage of cocoa butter (32–39%) than baking or eating chocolate. This additional cocoa butter, combined with proper tempering, gives the chocolate more sheen, a firmer "snap" when broken, a creamy mouthfeel, and a mellow flavor.

== Definition and term ==
The total "percentage" cited on many brands of chocolate is cocoa solids, or the sum of all ingredients derived from dried cocoa beans — in the case of couverture chocolate, typically chocolate liquor and cocoa butter. In order to be properly labeled as "couverture", the dark chocolate product must contain not less than 35% total dry cocoa solids, including not less than 31% cocoa butter and not less than 2.5% of dry non-fat cocoa solids, milk chocolate couverture must contain not less than 25% dry cocoa solids.

The term translates from French as "covering". It is legally regulated in the EU. Dark couverture chocolate almost always exceeds the minimum legally required cocoa content, and despite the law permitting 5% vegetable fat, its inclusion is very rare. It is not a regulated term in the US.

Couverture is used by professionals for dipping, coating, molding and garnishing. The term "couverture chocolate" is distinct from compound chocolate. Products that contain compound chocolate have a lower percentage of solids and contain non-cocoa fats. Some brands of couverture chocolate are packaged tempered, and others are packaged untempered. Subsequent tempering may or may not be required, depending on the usage and the desired characteristics of the final product.

== History ==
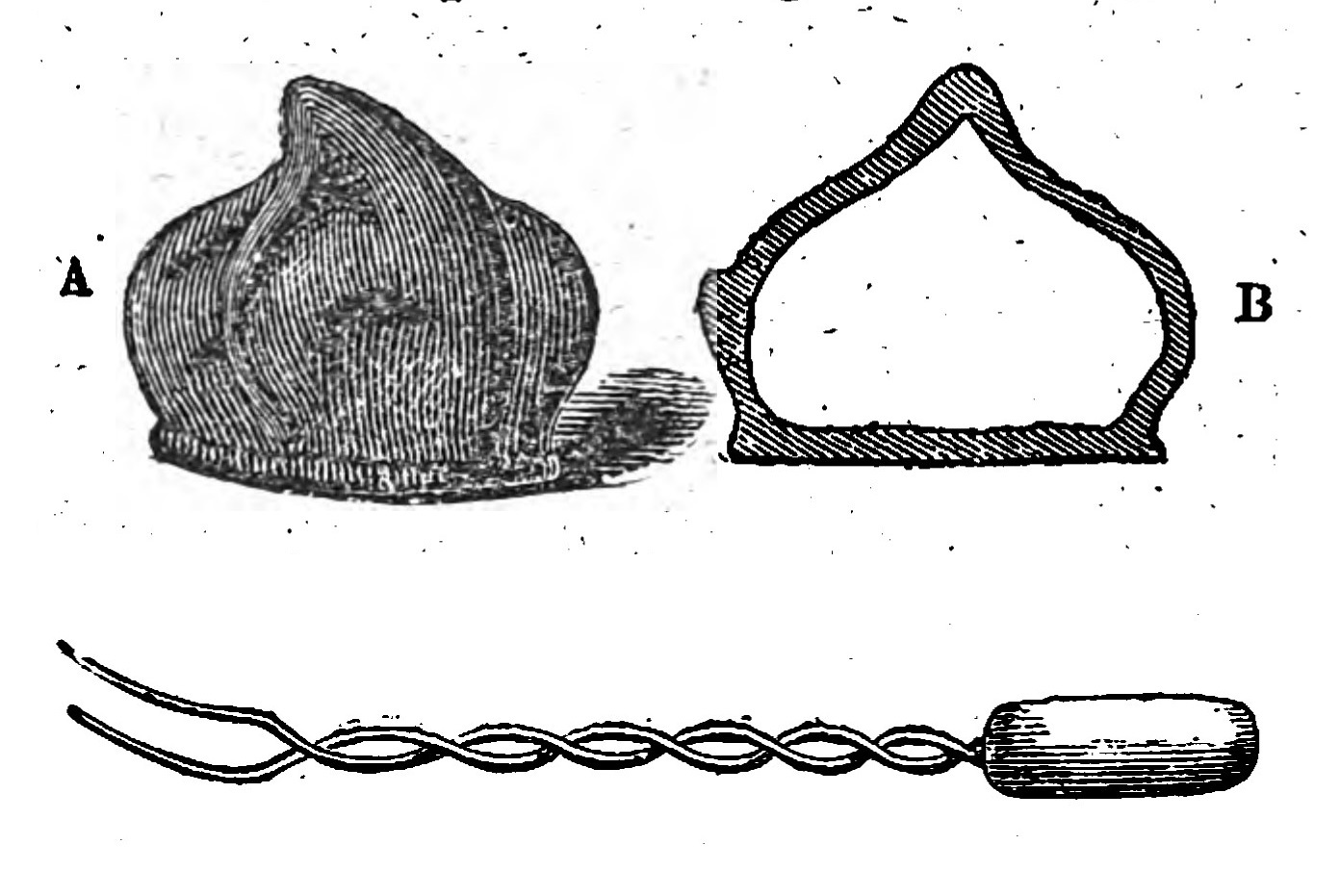
Praline de chocolat à la crème and fork for dipping in couverture

A mid-19th century French culinary guide recommends a superior quality chocolate, referred to as sauce or couverture, for the making of Pralines de chocolat à la crème, a chocolate-covered fondant candy commonly sold by confectioners in Paris. Additional cocoa butter is also advised to improve the fluidity of the chocolate if necessary. The process is described as a "chocolatier's secret that has not yet been published".

The development of the modern couverture chocolate is attributed to the Belgian manufacturer Callebaut. Octaaf Callebaut started producing chocolate in 1911, probably conched or "melting" chocolate, which was becoming increasingly popular at the time. His chocolate, characterized by a particularly high cocoa butter content and intended for professional chocolatiers, became especially popular after Callebaut invented a method for storing and transporting it in liquid form in 1920.

== See also ==
- Enrobing
- Types of chocolate
- Cake decorating
