= Bean-to-bar =

Business model in chocolate production

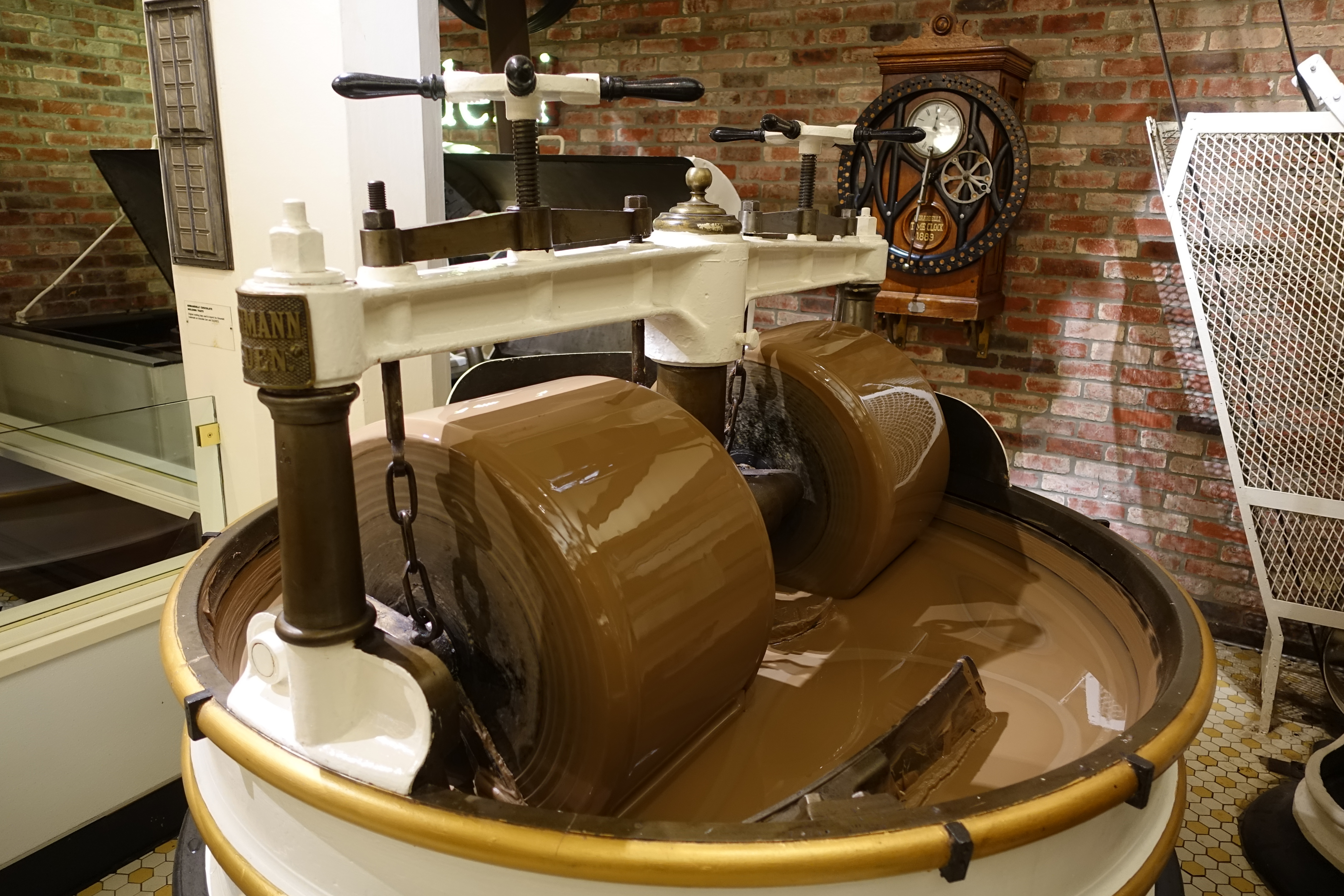
The chocolate melangeur, a piece of equipment used in bean-to-bar chocolate manufacturing which enables chocolate manufacturing in the home kitchen.

Bean-to-bar is a business model in which a chocolate manufacturer controls the entire manufacturing process from procuring cocoa beans to creating the end product of consumer chocolate.

== History ==
Starting in the 1970s and 1980s, some chocolate makers engaged in bean-to-bar manufacturing. They often used single-origin flavor cocoa and vintage equipment.

== Introduction to bean-to-bar ==
The term "bean-to-bar" emerged from the artisan and craft chocolate movement around 2010. It is sometimes used interchangeably with the terms "small batch chocolate" and "craft chocolate". Several hundred small chocolate manufacturing companies were started to meet the demand for bean-to-bar products and a wider variety of flavors emerging from new consumer requirements. Bean-to-bar manufacturers take great care in selecting their cacao beans with many traveling to plantations in tropical regions to meet with growers in order to establish direct-trade relationships, some have managed to gain access to control the fermentation process. Over 2,500 bean-to-bar manufacturers have emerged around the world in less than 20 years. Entrepreneurs from Australia, Canada, Europe, the United Kingdom and the United States with aptitudes for culinary arts, science, technology have all proven to be successful as chocolate makers.

All bean-to-bar chocolate makers process whole cocoa beans into a final product versus melting chocolate or starting with ground cocoa mass for use as a base, coating, filling or for mixing and molding into truffles, pralines, or other chocolate confectionery. One of the largest startups, the Mast Brothers, which was "widely credited for introducing artisanal chocolate to mainstream American culture" actually employed commercially produced chocolate from a third-party, making them better known as the creators of fake bean-to-bar chocolate in 2015. Big Chocolate has also been using the term to compete with the craft chocolate industry developed around the bean-to-bar concept.

As a result of the rise in consumer demand for fine and aromatic dark chocolate created by bean-to-bar (craft chocolate movement) and the idea of small batch recipes, new types of processing equipment and machinery have been developed facilitating small business development. Bean-to-bar chocolate makers are revolutionizing the world of chocolate leading to the development of many new legal marketing terms to better describe their products to match consumer demand and expectations. Schools and universities have developed classes and courses in bean-to-bar chocolate making and business development. New certifications, endorsements and labelling schemes based on ethical consumer values have also appeared. Big Chocolate has outright acquired several craft bean-to-bar operations.

=== Supply chain development ===
Some bean-to-bar producers are large companies that own the entire process for cost saving, economy of scale, and vertical integration; others aim to control the whole process to improve quality, working conditions, environmental impact, and the source. Some cacao farms in tropical America have incorporated the trade model to make the supply chain more sustainable by producing tree-to-bar and farm-to-bar chocolate.

Cacao growers and buyers hire certification companies to inspect plantations, take soil samples, guarantee pricing to farmers and develop regional cooperative associations for cocoa growers. Bean-to-bar chocolate makers pay for these certified labels to address issues important to their consumers.

== Legal, marketing and technical term ==
Unlike the large scale secondary processing from general chocolate liquor mass, the bean-to-bar chocolate manufacturing style must follow the guideline that the primary company handles the entire process from the purchase of cacao beans to the making of the chocolate bar. Because the term is not limited to small craft chocolate manufacturers, and in light of consumer demand for bean-to-bar brands, larger companies have adopted the term and some of the other related terms used by smaller chocolate makers.

It is believed the industry was started in the late 90's, in San Francisco, where two men — John Scharffenberger and Robert Steinberg — spent a decade beginning a movement while building their business, and then spreading that movement by selling their business. The predominant theory of the start of the craft chocolate industry is that a boom occurred around the Mast Brothers, who entered the chocolate making industry after Scharffenberger from different industries in New York around 2008. By 2014 in Japan, the brand "Minimal", was introduced as a pioneer for the inspiration of bean-to-bar makers there, its taste has been recognized at international competitions.

Many bean-to-bar chocolate makers are based solely online, some have stores for their product, some use other retail locations to sell their product, some contract their facilities and some even private label chocolates for other companies.

== See also ==
- List of bean-to-bar chocolate manufacturers
- Fair trade cocoa – Cocoa sold under a patented price floor program

== Sources ==
- Martin, Carla D; Sampeck, Kathryn E (2015). "The bitter and sweet of chocolate in Europe". Socio.hu Social Science Review. 5 (SI3): 37–60. doi:10.18030/socio.hu.2015en.37. eISSN 2063-0468.
