= White chocolate =

Chocolate made without cocoa solids

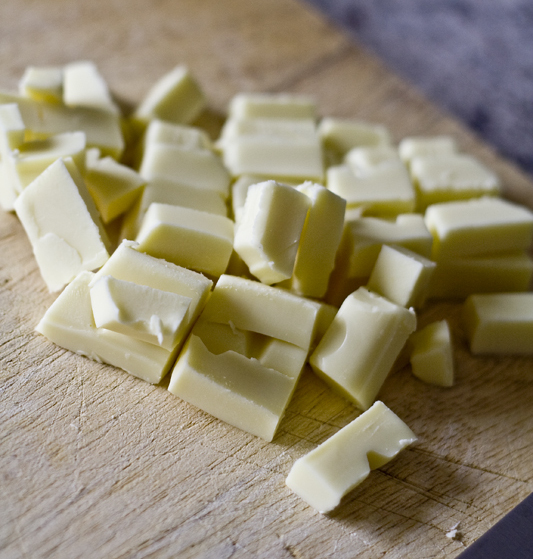
- Type: Chocolate
- Place of origin: Switzerland
- Main ingredients: Cocoa butter, sugar, milk solids
- Ingredients generally used: Vanilla

White chocolate is chocolate made from cocoa butter, sugar, and milk solids. It is ivory in color and lacks the dark appearance of most other types of chocolate because it does not contain the non-fat solid components of cocoa (cocoa powder). Due to this omission, as well as its sweetness and the occasional use of additives, some consumers do not consider white chocolate to be real chocolate.

Of the three traditional types of chocolate (the others being milk and dark), white chocolate is the least popular. Its taste and texture are divisive: admirers praise its texture as creamy, while detractors criticize its flavor as cloying and bland. White chocolate is sold in a variety of forms, including bars, chips, and coatings for nuts. It is common for manufacturers to pair white chocolate with other flavors, such as matcha or berries. White chocolate has a shorter shelf life than milk and dark chocolate, and easily picks up odors from the environment.

White chocolate is made industrially in a five-step process. First, the ingredients are mixed to form a paste. Next, the paste is refined, reducing the particle size to a powder. It is then agitated for several hours (a process known as conching), after which further processing standardizes its viscosity and taste. Finally, the chocolate is tempered by heating, cooling, and then reheating, which improves the product's appearance, stability, and snap.

White chocolate was first sold commercially in tablet form in 1936 by the Swiss company Nestlé and was long considered a children's food in Europe. It was not until the 1980s that white chocolate became popular in the United States. During the 21st century, attitudes towards white chocolate changed: markets for "premium" white chocolate grew, it became socially acceptable for adults in the UK to eat it, and it was legally defined in the US for the first time. A variant, blond chocolate, was created by slowly cooking white chocolate over several days.

== History ==
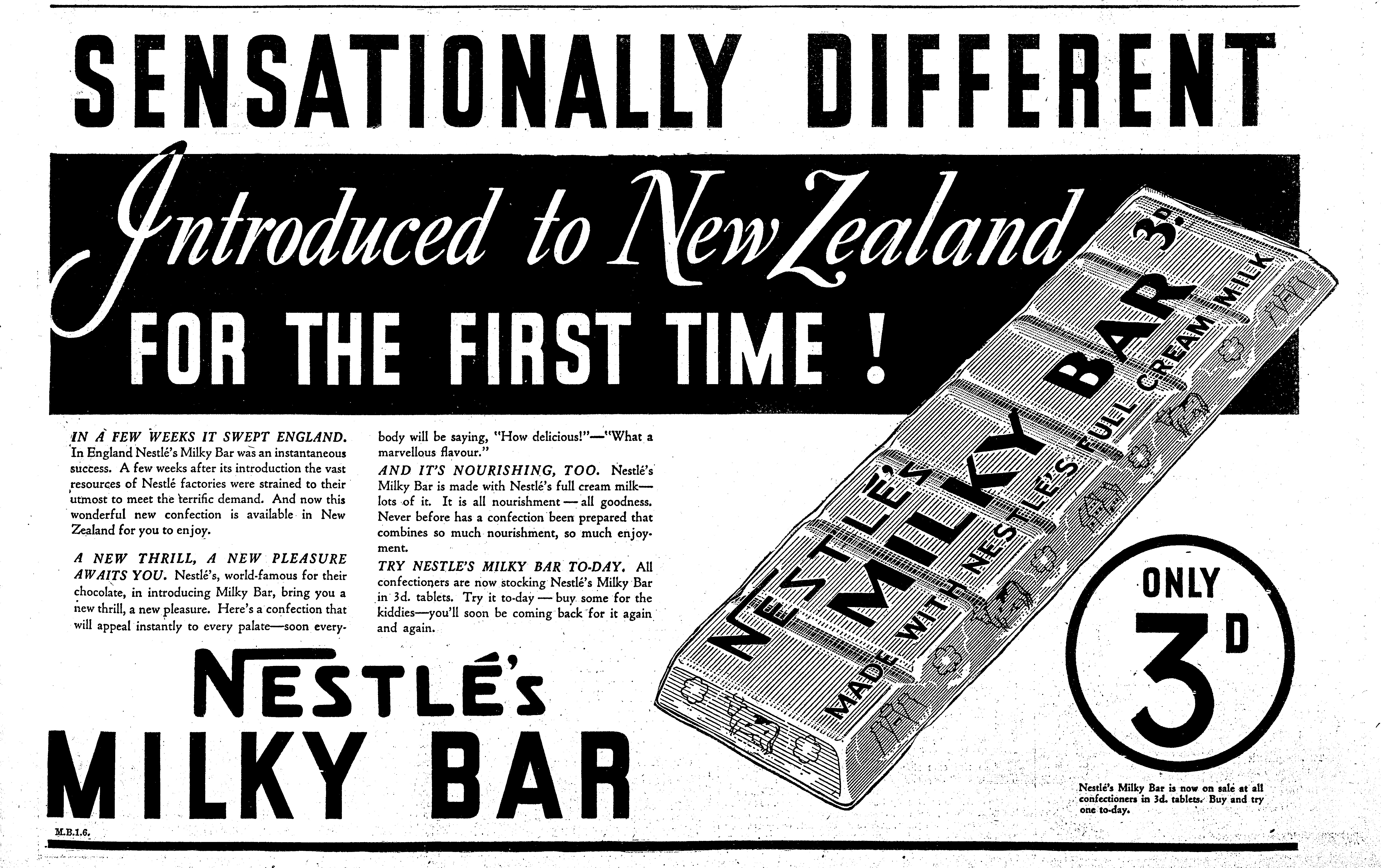
1936 ad for Milkybar

The origin of white chocolate is unclear. According to the Oxford English Dictionary, the term was first used in a December 1917 issue of Scientific American magazine, in which it was described as a product made entirely of cocoa butter and sugar, eaten by the Swiss Army. The dictionary also mentions a rumor, printed in the International Confectioner magazine the previous December, of a white-colored chocolate being made in Switzerland. In 1936, the Swiss company Nestlé launched a tablet called Nestlé Galak (known as Milkybar in the United Kingdom). According to author Eagranie Yuh there is a "general consensus" that this constitutes the first commercial white chocolate product. One account of Galak's creation indicates that demand for milk powder had decreased in the years following World War I, creating a glut; making white chocolate was a way manufacturers could use up this excess. According to Nestlé, before 1936 they had been manufacturing a coating for a vitamin product in partnership with the pharmaceutical group Roche. They created white chocolate by accident when they added cocoa butter to the coating's formula.

On its introduction in the UK, white chocolate was sold under the names "white chocolate", "white milk chocolate" and "milk chocolate block". Describing this new product as "chocolate" was immediately challenged as it lacked non-fat cocoa solids and in at least one county, companies agreed to avoid the word "chocolate". Production of Milkybar was suspended in the UK in 1940 due to ingredient shortages caused by World War II and did not resume until 1956. White chocolate in Europe was closely associated with children, as adults believed it was more appropriate than chocolates with caffeine and strong flavors. In 1961, Nestlé created "The Milkybar Kid" mascot, a blond boy sporting glasses and a cowboy outfit. Over the following decades, a series of adverts featuring the character has become among the longest-running on television.

In 1965, the chocolate maker Elgorriaga produced the first white chocolate in Spain. Other large manufacturers in the country soon followed, one of them producing an almond-white chocolate sweet. During the following decades in Spain, the chocolate was predominantly sold via grocery stores; it was used sparingly by artisans to provide contrast with milk and dark chocolate products. By the 1980s, the global white chocolate market was largely confined to a niche premium market in Europe. The Belgians were considered specialists, most famous for large white chocolate pralines flavored with orange peel. By the end of the 20th century in Continental Europe, white chocolate was no longer primarily associated with children, as manufacturers had begun marketing it as a luxury good.

Upon its introduction to Japan in 1968 by Rokkatei Confectionery, white chocolate was unpopular and restricted to Hokkaido. The situation remained unchanged until the 1970s, when Japanese National Railways launched the Discover Japan campaign. Young backpackers travelled to Hokkaido and tasted the new chocolate for the first time, spreading its popularity across Japan. That decade, Japanese chocolate companies invented a holiday called White Day. Celebrated one month after Valentine's Day, it involved men giving white chocolate to women who had given them dark chocolate a month prior. Around the late 1980s, Nestlé, then the world market leader in white chocolate, pushed to create a mass market for white chocolate in Japan.

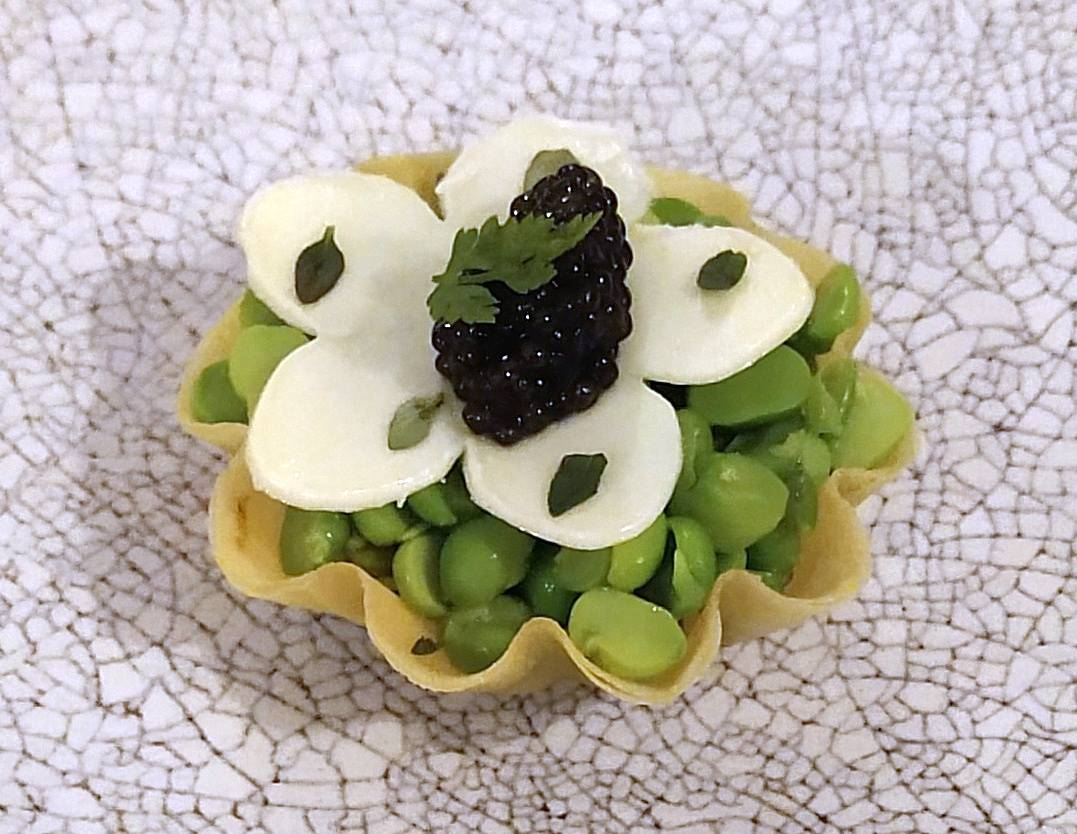
White chocolate is featured in savory dishes, as seen above in a pea tart topped with caviar and white chocolate.

At the turn of the 21st century, culinary approaches to white chocolate shifted. In Spain, the use of white chocolate increased as artistic chocolate molding became more popular, particularly in works depicting Christmas and Easter subjects. Chefs within the molecular gastronomy movement in the 2000s used white chocolate, creating white chocolate fizz and pairing it with caviar. In Paris, pastry chef Sadaharu Aoki paired white chocolate with matcha for the first time, using the sweetness of the chocolate to offset the bitterness of the matcha. Over the next few years, restaurants like The French Laundry and chocolate companies including Meiji and Nestlé (in Kit Kat) released treats featuring the combination. In the UK, Cadbury estimated that white chocolate accounted for 1–2% of chocolate consumed. To expand the market, chocolate makers began marketing white chocolate to adults, particularly women: Cadbury released the Cadbury Snowflake and Dream, and Nestlé released white chocolate versions of Aero and Kit Kat. By 2017 in the UK, white chocolate was widely considered acceptable for adults to eat. In France, the chocolate is particularly favored by children.

Since 2012, the French chocolate manufacturer Valrhona has sold "blond chocolate", invented around 2005 after white chocolate was accidentally left in a bain-marie for several days, creating a chocolate with toasted, caramel flavors. As of 2024, Valrhona was lobbying the French government to recognize it as a separate type of chocolate.

=== In the United States ===
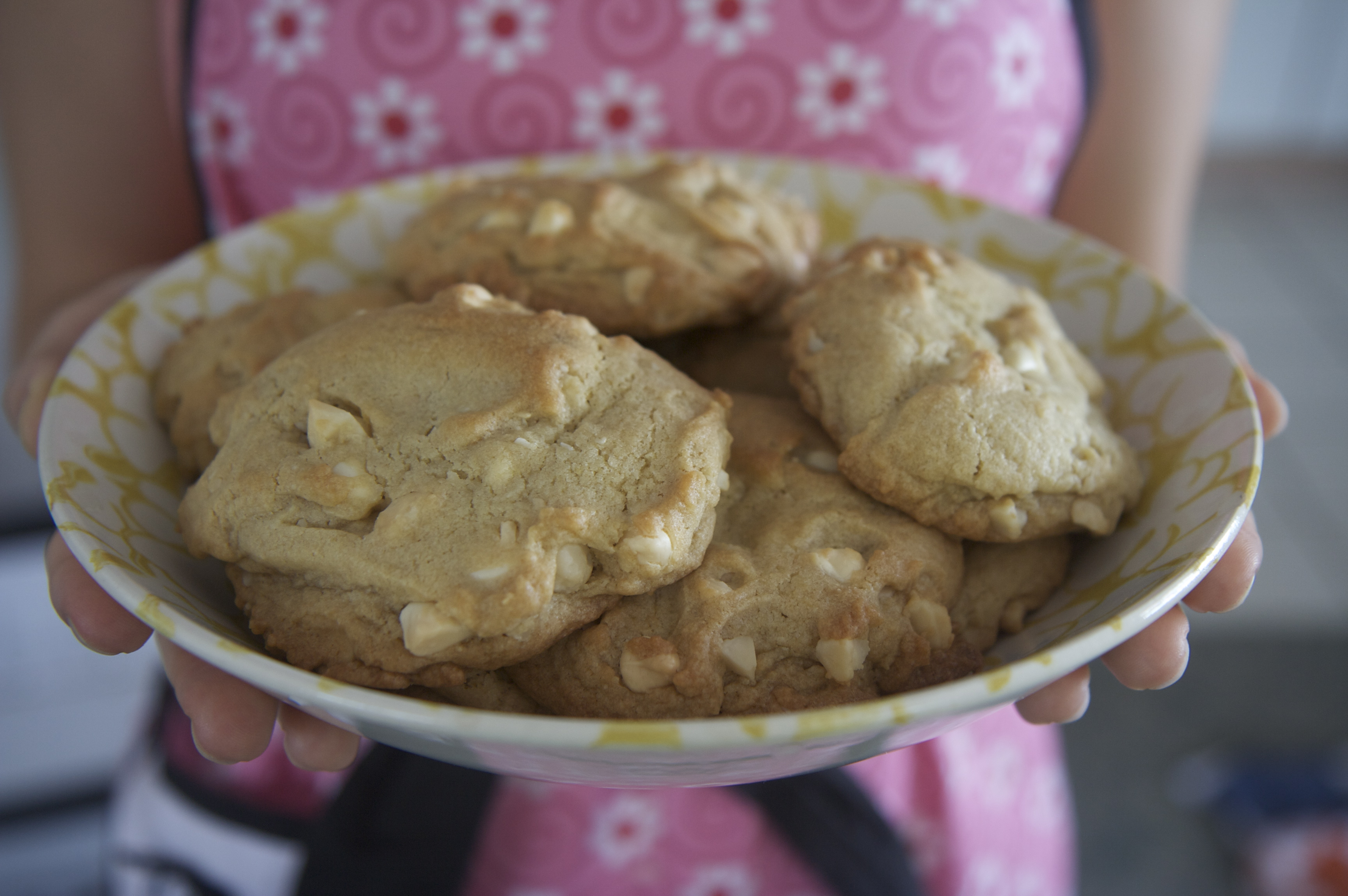
White chocolate chip and macadamia cookies

Hebert Candies says that they introduced white chocolate to the United States for the first time in 1956. However, it did not become popular until the 1980s, after a white chocolate mousse served by chef Michel Fitoussi in New York City in 1977 started a white chocolate fad. Imports from Europe rose; the chocolate was marketed as European and considered trendy. Pastry chefs used the product's plasticity to build decorations for cakes. White chocolate versions of desserts like truffles, cheesecakes, brownies and chocolate chip cookies were made, even as the mousse remained the most popular. In desserts, it was often paired with berries to balance the richness of the chocolate.

White chocolate was made and mass-distributed in the United States for the first time in 1984, when Nestlé released Alpine White, a white chocolate bar containing almonds, which they promoted to the "female indulgence" market. Growth in white chocolate consumption was driven by the product's uniqueness and perceptions that it was "lighter and more delicate" than other types of chocolate, a desirable quality for customers who felt they needed a respite from the rich chocolate desserts that had been popular. Further growth came from the popularity of white chocolate macadamia cookies produced by Mrs. Fields. During this period, some consumers believed that because of its light color, white chocolate contained fewer calories and fats than darker chocolates.

By the 1990s, however, white chocolate had become unpopular and disliked, and Nestlé discontinued Alpine White in 1993. That decade, The Hershey Company introduced Hershey's Cookies 'n' Creme, a white chocolate product embedded with cookie chunks, to the US market, and Nestlé released a White Crunch bar; however, these failed to turn around sales. As of 2001, much of the "white chocolate" sold in the United States was made of palm kernel oils or hydrogenated fats and called "compound coating". It was sold as "ivory", "blanc", or just wrapped in clear plastic bags, and labels did not clearly distinguish between white chocolate made with and without cocoa butter. The popular disdain for white chocolate could be seen in hyperbolic opinions expressed in an online survey that April, wherein participants stated it "tasted like candle wax" and was "for communist spies."

In the early 1990s, Hershey and the Chocolate Manufacturers Association (now part of the National Confectioners Association) began lobbying the Food and Drug Administration to regulate a standard of identity for white chocolate. The FDA at the time forbade white chocolate being marketed as "chocolate" unless manufacturers held rare permits that had to be renewed every fifteen months. (Note: The Hershey Company was one of the few companies that held this permit and thus could market confectionery such as Cookies 'n' Cream bars as containing white chocolate.) In deliberating what a standard of identity for white chocolate would be, the agency struggled to establish what percentage of cocoa was appropriate and whether to permit the addition of antioxidants. In 1997, the FDA released a proposal for a standard of identity, and in 2002, in response to a decade of lobbying, the administrative burden of the permit system and to make it easier to market US white chocolate internationally, the FDA regulated a standard of identity for white chocolate for the first time. This was enforced beginning in 2004 and required white chocolate to be made of at least 20% cocoa butter. As demand for cocoa butter caused prices to double between 2005 and 2015, some American producers switched to producing white chocolate for the premium chocolate market.

== Manufacturing ==
=== Ingredients ===
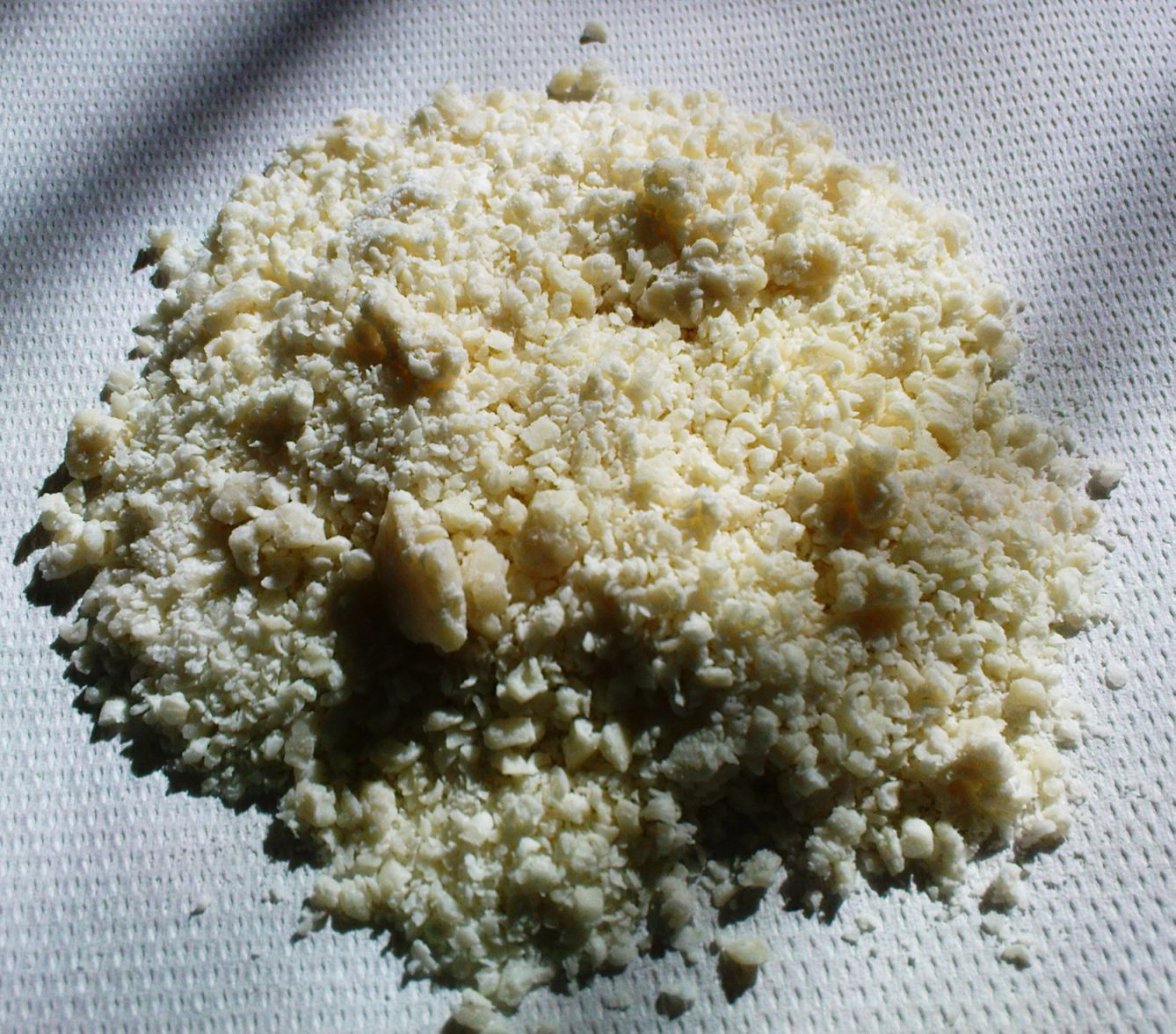
Cocoa butter, broken into pieces

In cocoa beans, cocoa butter and cocoa powder (the non-fat component) appear in roughly equal proportions. During manufacturing, cocoa solids are separated from ground cocoa beans, known as cocoa liquor, leaving behind the cocoa butter. White chocolate uses only the cocoa butter. As pure pressed cocoa butter has a flavor that can be unpleasant, before it is used it is partly deodorized using either solvents or steam distillation under vacuum. The butter is not fully deodorized, as it then would lose all its cocoa flavor. Less deodorized cocoa butters are used in dark chocolate, where the flavor is considered by manufacturers to be more desirable, while white chocolates use more deodorized cocoa butter. Some craft chocolate makers have eschewed deodorizing cocoa butter when producing white chocolate, a practice popularized by the Venezuelan chocolate maker Chocolates El Rey.

Beyond cocoa butter, white chocolate contains sugar, milk solids, emulsifiers (generally soy lecithin or PGPR), and flavors (generally vanilla). Manufacturers replace the milk solids with other milk products to create different effects: for instance, some use yogurt powder, as the acidity masks the sweetness of the sugar. Other manufacturers use white chocolate crumb (a mixture of sugar, milk and cocoa butter dried together) to produce a caramelized flavor, or use skim milk powder and milk fat instead of full cream milk powder to create a softer white chocolate. The ratio between cocoa butter, sugar and milk fat impacts the quality: higher-quality white chocolate recipes require less sugar with more cocoa butter and milk fat. In some chocolate, some cocoa butter is replaced with cocoa butter equivalents (CBEs) and cocoa butter substitutes (CBSs). CBEs are fats with similar triglyceride structures, such as palm oil and shea butter, while CBSs are fats with dissimilar triglyceride structures that are refined to have similar hardness, mouthfeel and flavor release. These include fully refined fats made from palm kernel and coconut oil.

=== Process ===
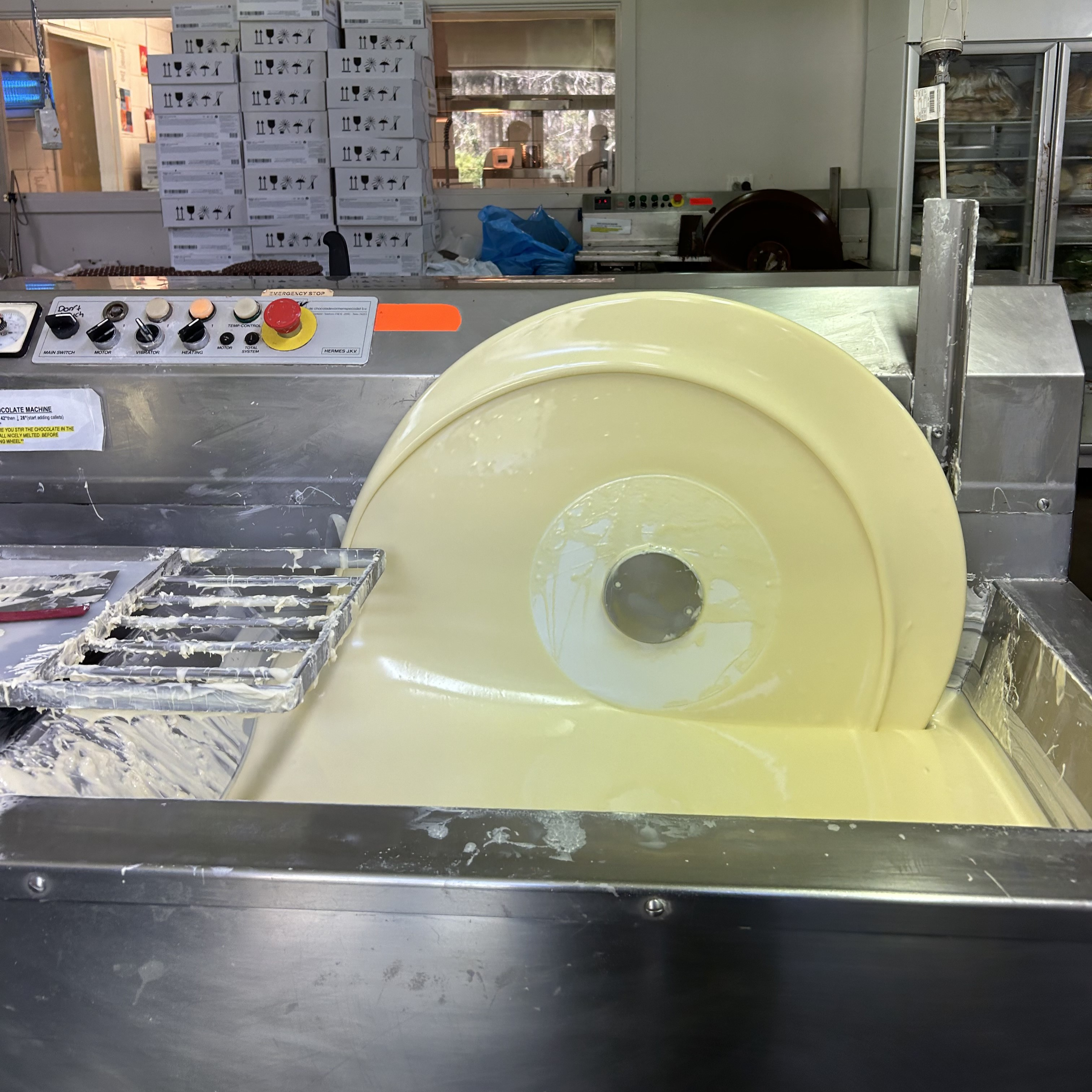
Tempering white chocolate

The basic process of making white chocolate involves mixing, refining, conching, standardizing and tempering.

In the mixing phase, cocoa butter is combined with sugar, milk solids, emulsifiers and flavorings. These ingredients are mixed until a rough paste is formed. The paste enters a refining machine, which passes the mass through large steel rollers set to varying widths, turning it into a dry powder. The product is then transferred to a conching machine. These machines mix and knead the chocolate, changing the flavor and texture. White chocolate is conched between 40 and 50 °C (104–122 °F), the lowest temperature of the traditional types of chocolates; conching at higher temperatures can add undesirable flavors to the chocolate, caused by the Maillard reaction. After conching, the viscosity and taste of the mixture is standardized by adding flavorings, emulsifiers or cocoa butter. This is necessary if manufacturers want to use automatic molding or enrobing equipment.

The final step in the production process is to temper the chocolate. While waiting to be tempered, the chocolate is stored in liquid form. Storing white chocolate in this way is particularly difficult compared to other types of chocolates, as it tends to thicken and caramelize at higher temperatures. To prevent this, the chocolate is constantly stirred while being held between 38 and 40 °C (100–104 °F). Before tempering, chocolate is heated to ensure all the cocoa butter that has crystallized has melted; in white chocolate this occurs at about 40–45 °C (104–113 °F), lower than in milk and dark chocolates. During tempering, chocolate is cooled to the point where the cocoa butter can begin to crystallize, and then heated to melt more unstable crystal structures, leaving only the most stable behind. For white chocolate, the temperatures the chocolate is cooled and then heated to during tempering are lower than those needed for other chocolates, as much as 4 °C (7.2 °F) lower than is needed for dark chocolate. High milk fat contents in white and milk chocolates reduces the temperature at which they solidify; as a result, they require longer cooling. The softness and viscosity of white chocolate makes it the most challenging type for manufacturers to work with.

=== Regulations ===
International and national regulations govern what can be marketed as white chocolate. International standards are laid out in the Codex Alimentarius, which is revised very infrequently: as of 2017 it had not been changed since 2003. The standards require white chocolate to contain at least 20% cocoa butter and 14% milk solids. Countries applying the standards are free to choose between enforcing a minimum 2.5% or 3.5% milk fat percentage—the two figures having been created when negotiations failed to agree on a single choice. In addition, white chocolate made under the Codex's standards cannot contain more than 5% CBS/CBE by weight. Given the Codex requirements, participating countries can choose to accept them in full or in a modified form. Participating countries include all members of the World Trade Organization, which, upon joining, are obliged to base their domestic standards on international agreements such as the Codex.

In the European Union, white chocolate's composition is regulated by the European Cocoa and Chocolate Directive, which passed in 2000. This directive reflects the Codex, but requires the higher 3.5% minimum milk fat percentage. In January 2022, the European Food Safety Authority banned the food coloring agent E171 (titanium dioxide), which had been commonly used as a whitener in some white chocolate products. In Canada, the Canadian Food Inspection Agency regulates white chocolate's composition. It does not permit the use of artificial sweeteners or CBSs. Japan does not explicitly define an identity for white chocolate. In India, Brazil and China – chocolate markets believed by some manufacturers to have good potential for growth – regulations for white chocolate vary. The permissibility of CBS/CBEs for instance ranges from unrestricted in Brazil to prohibited in India.

Since 2004 in the United States, the regulations laid out by the Food and Drug Administration in the Code of Federal Regulations have defined white chocolate as containing, by weight, at least 20% cocoa butter, 3.5% milk fat and 14% total milk solids. These regulations also limit "nutritive carbohydrate sweetener" (generally sucrose) to 55% of the chocolate by weight, and indicates that white chocolate cannot be artificially colored or contain imitation flavorings. Compared to milk and dark chocolates, white chocolate is permitted to contain an unusually high amount of emulsifiers: up to 1.5% of the formula, 50% more what other chocolates are allowed to contain. It is also the only chocolate to which antioxidants can be added, to prevent rancidification. Unlike in the EU, products containing vegetable fats other than cocoa butter cannot be labelled "chocolate".

== Characteristics ==
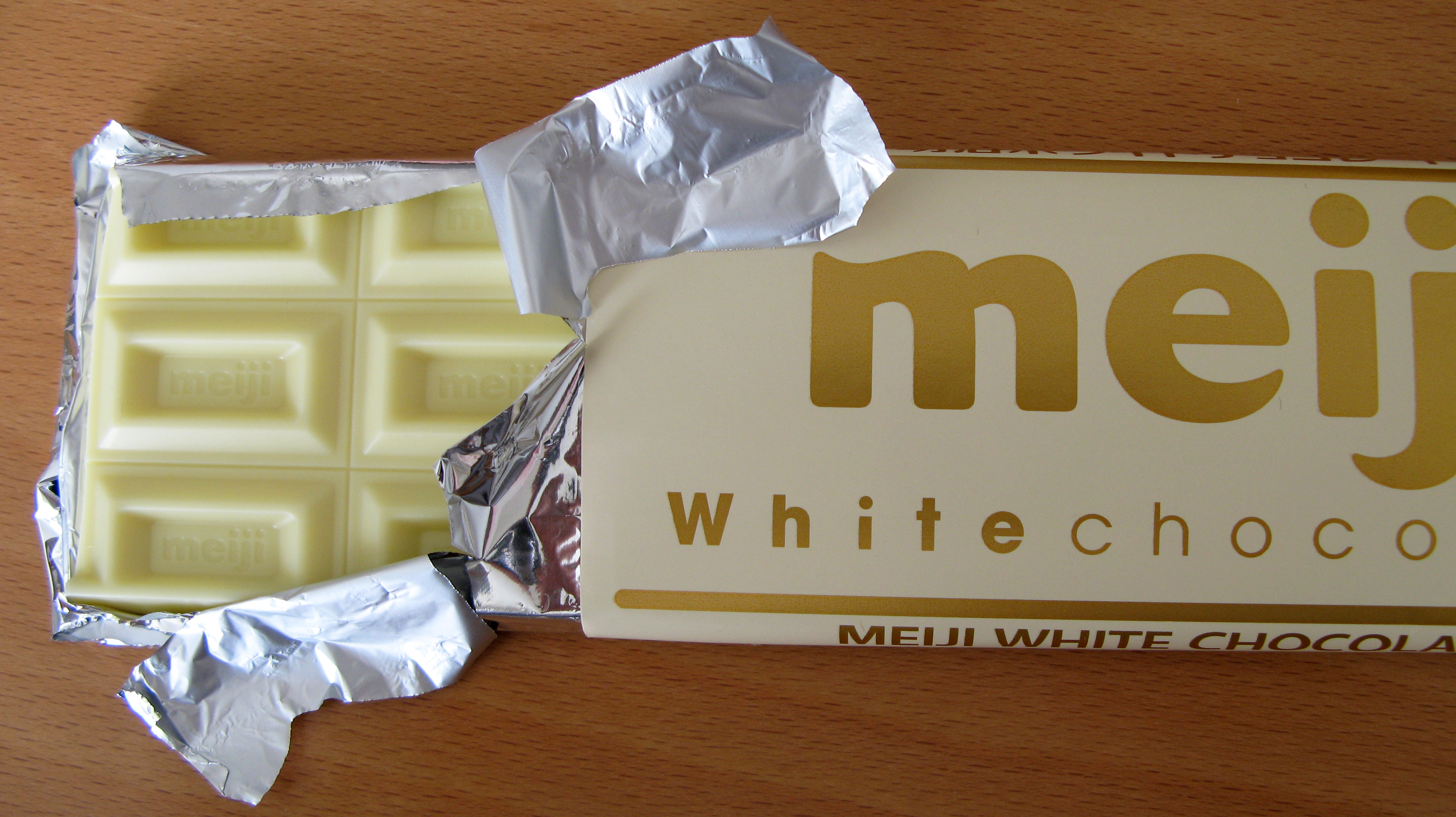
Chocolate bar wrapped in a metallized foil to protect it from light

White chocolate has an ivory color and can smell of biscuit, vanilla or caramel, although it can easily pick up undesirable environmental smells, leading to aromas of rancidity or cheese. White chocolate made from nondeodorized cocoa butter retains the aroma of chocolate, but has an unappealing taste to most consumers. (Note: According to food writer Maricel Presilla, this chocolates tastes like higher-quality milk chocolate.) Cocoa butter can contribute a yellow color to white chocolate, which some consumers consider undesirable. Milk fats contribute to white chocolate's flavor in three ways: they add a milky taste to the final chocolate, help diffuse other flavors, making them easier to perceive, and finally they serve as flavor precursors (ingredients that produce new flavors as they are processed). A metallic taste is a common undesirable flavor in some white chocolates. Cardboard or paper flavors can also be present, caused by exposure to oxygen. There is some evidence that white chocolate cannot eliminate chocolate cravings.

Due to the absence of cocoa antioxidants which act as natural preservatives, white chocolate typically has a shorter shelf life than milk and dark chocolate, ranging from 6 to 16 months. The presence of delicate milk fats in white chocolate also means white chocolate expires faster if packed in a transparent wrapper, as these fats will decompose faster if exposed to light. Instead, metallized films are used.

=== Nutrition ===
White chocolate
Nutritional value per 100 g (3.5 oz)
- Energy: 2,250 kJ (540 kcal)
- Carbohydrates: 59.2
- Sugars: 59
- Dietary fiber: 0.2 g
- Fat: 32.1
- Protein: 5.87
Vitamins and minerals
Vitamins	Quantity %DV^{†}
Vitamin A equiv.	1% 9 μg
Vitamin A	30 IU
Thiamine (B1)	5% 0.063 mg
Riboflavin (B2)	22% 0.282 mg
Niacin (B3)	5% 0.745 mg
Pantothenic acid (B5)	12% 0.608 mg
Vitamin B6	3% 0.056 mg
Folate (B9)	2% 7 μg
Vitamin E	6% 0.96 mg
Vitamin K	8% 9.1 μg
Minerals	Quantity %DV^{†}
Calcium	15% 199 mg
Copper	7% 0.06 mg
Iron	1% 0.24 mg
Magnesium	3% 12 mg
Manganese	0% 0.008 mg
Phosphorus	14% 176 mg
Potassium	10% 286 mg
Selenium	8% 4.5 μg
Sodium	4% 90 mg
Zinc	7% 0.74 mg
- Other constituents: Quantity
- Water: 1.3 g
- Caffeine: 0 mg
- Theobromine: 0 mg
- †Percentages estimated using US recommendations for adults, except for potassium, which is estimated based on expert recommendation from the National Academies. Source: Link to USDA Database entry

White chocolate is typically 59% carbohydrates, 32% fat, 6% protein and 1% water (see table). These nutritional contents differ from those of milk and dark chocolates: they are respectively 59% and 61% carbohydrates, 30 and 31% fat and 8% and 5% protein. (Note: Dark chocolate samples of 45–59% cocoa) In a reference amount of 100 grams (3.5 oz), white chocolate supplies 2,250 kJ (540 kcal) of food energy, is a rich source (22% of the Daily Value, DV) of riboflavin and a moderate source (10–15% DV) of pantothenic acid, calcium, phosphorus and potassium (table). (Note: The FDA considers a food to be a moderate source of a nutrient if, per serving, it contains 5–20% of Daily Value. If it contains over 20%, it is considered high.) Almost all of white chocolate's carbohydrate content is made up of sugars (table), giving it the highest sugar content of the traditional types of chocolate. As white chocolate lacks cocoa solids, it does not contain polyphenols. (Note: Polyphenol compounds are the basis of several of the health claims that exist around chocolate consumption.)

== Uses ==
White chocolate is used in a range of confections, including chocolate bars and panned (coated) chocolate products, such as panned nuts. These are produced using enrobing, molding and panning techniques. Other applications of white chocolate include fèves, pistoles, chocolate chips, rochers and gianduja. White chocolate has a more muted taste than other chocolates and as a result is more frequently produced in combination with other flavors. Chocolate liqueurs are occasionally made from white chocolate, and have a flavor of anise.

Bakers typically adjust cake recipes to include less sugar when including white chocolate, to avoid the chocolate's sweetness becoming overwhelming. In the United States, white chocolate, supplemented with fat-soluble colors and flavors, is often used to coat candies and cakes. The US also features white chocolate in cookies, as in the common white chocolate and macadamia flavor combination. Some cooks caramelize white chocolate, cooking it at a low temperature over a long time, increasing the chocolate flavor's complexity and introducing nutty notes. White chocolate features with desserts, accompanying them as white chocolate sauce, or garnishing them as shavings. It is sometimes used as an ingredient in ice cream and ganache or added to coffee when making white chocolate mocha.

White chocolate is used in some regional cuisines. In Germany, for instance, white chocolate shavings represent parmesan in the ice cream dish spaghettieis. In Calabria, Italy, white chocolate frequently coats the pastry mustacciuoli and in New Orleans, Louisiana, white chocolate is used to make white chocolate bread pudding. In Hokkaido, Japan, sweets such as Shiroi Koibito and Marusei Butter Sandwich include white chocolate, using the color to symbolize the region's winter snow.

== Market ==
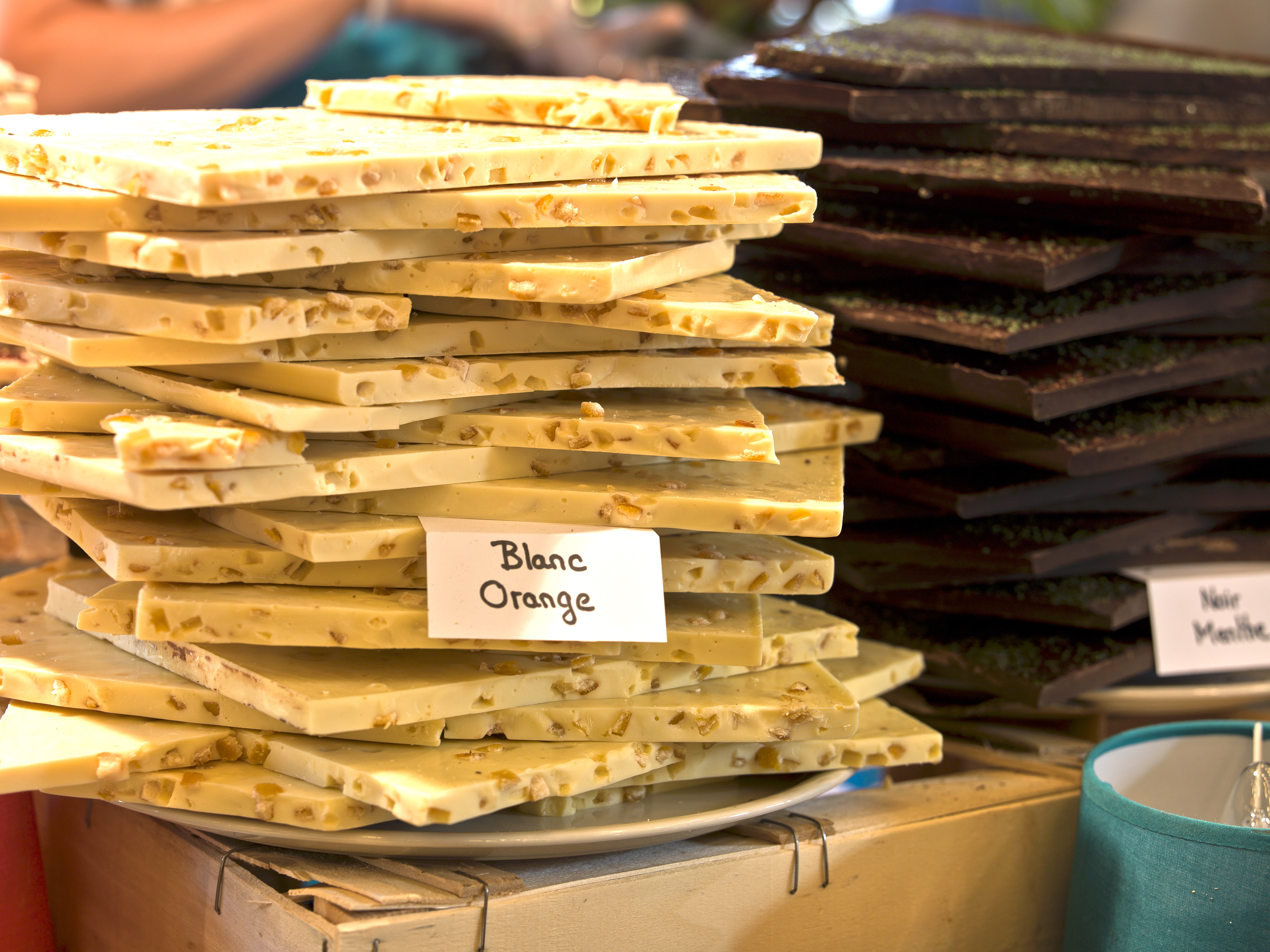
White chocolate with orange inclusions, presented at the chocolate industry trade fair Salon du Chocolat in 2014

White chocolate is less popular than both milk and dark chocolate. Consumption is highly concentrated in a few countries: market research by Euromonitor in 2014 found almost half of the US$1.5 billion market for white chocolate was consumed in Brazil, the UK and the US. White chocolate is particularly popular in Brazil, only milk chocolate is more popular, and as of 2014 Brazilian white chocolate consumption made up over 20% of the global market.

In the US, white chocolate made up around 10% of the chocolate market in 2022 according to the National Confectioners Association. As of 2006, most white chocolate was imported from Europe, with the chocolate makers Guittard, Baker's and Askinosie responsible for domestic production. In the UK, Milkybar has held a dominant position in the white chocolate market for many years, holding 80% of the then £41 million market in 1992, and 60% of the £70 million market in 2010. As of 2020, Milkybar remains the most popular white chocolate in the UK and Ireland.

In a 2024 Mintel survey of US consumers, preference for white chocolate had a sharp generational divide, with millennials more than twice as likely to purchase the product as baby boomers. The same generational divide was observed by Mintel in a 2023 survey of UK consumers, with white chocolate most favored by consumers aged 16–24 and disfavored by those over 65.

In Euromonitor's research, markets are divided into white, dark, milk and filled chocolates. From this 2014 data, white chocolate was most preferred in Brazil, the Netherlands and South Africa, and least preferred in Turkey, Greece and Canada. How white chocolate is consumed varies across countries. In Mexico for instance, white chocolate is mainly used as an ingredient in baked goods and "fine candies", while in Japan craft white chocolate occupies an unusually large portion of consumption.

Countries in the European Union exported white chocolate worth €397 million to countries outside the EU in 2024. Belgium dominated these exports, accounting for almost half of all trade. Domestically in Belgium white chocolate is often used for decorative purposes, mixed with dark and milk chocolate. Germany was the second largest exporter by value, accounting for around 15%, (Note: Belgium and Germany exported €192,003,625 and €58,468,546 worth of white chocolate outside the EU respectively.) while €97 million worth of white chocolate was imported into the EU that year. Exports had increased by over 25% in value since 2023, with Italy, the fourth largest exporter, seeing a doubling in the value of its exports. An increase in the value of exports from Belgium accounted for 60% of the growth.

Several established international brands produce white chocolate for the premium white chocolate market, including Italy's Ferrero, Belgium's Godiva, France's Valrhona, and the American artisan chocolate makers Guittard and Ghirardelli. Manufacturers also sell white chocolate varieties of established chocolate products, including Twix, Kit Kat and M&M's.

=== Divisiveness ===
The flavor and texture of white chocolate is divisive: enjoyed by some for its "creamy" and "unctuous" texture, it is disliked by others who find the chocolate cloying, and the underlying flavor bland. The relative unpopularity of white chocolate when compared to other types of chocolate has been attributed to a lower aromatic compound content. For some fans of white chocolate, perceptions of its flavor and color as "unusual" contribute to its appeal.

Some chocolatiers, trade groups and members of the public dispute whether white chocolate should be considered chocolate. This controversy stems from multiple factors: the presence of additives such as palm oil in some products, high levels of sweeteners and an absence of cocoa solids. Proponents, in defense of the categorization, highlight the confectionery's base of cocoa beans that it shares with other products considered chocolate. Craft white chocolate makers are conditional in accepting white chocolate to be "real" chocolate, excluding products containing vegetable fats. Food writer David Lebovitz has criticised the controversy, analogizing critics to someone disputing the terms hamburger and milkshake because the products today are not made from ham nor shaken.

== Variations ==
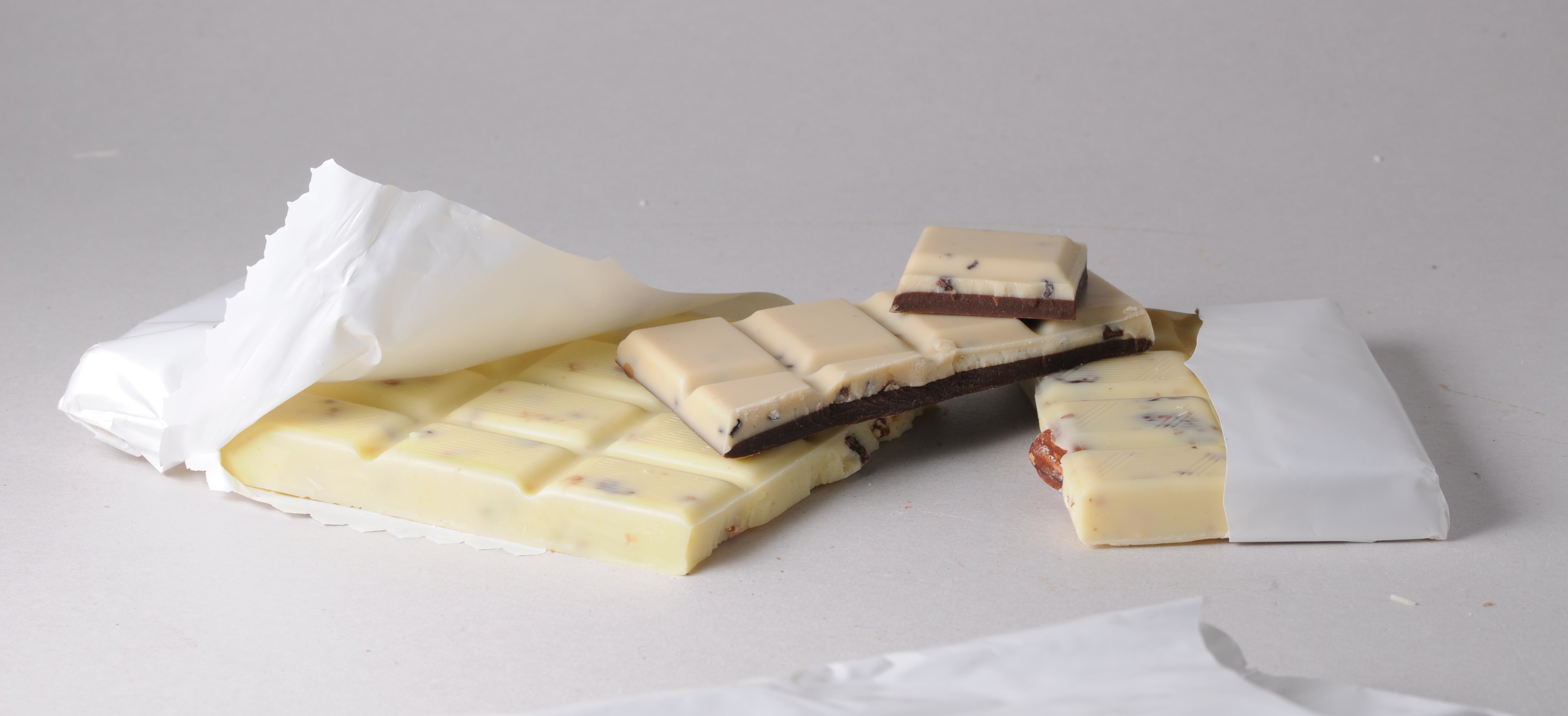
White chocolates with various inclusions, including grape, hazelnut and coffee

Sugar-free and reduced-sugar white chocolates replace sucrose with maltitol, a sugar alcohol, sometimes in combination with a fiber blend and stevia. These chocolates also replace milk ingredients with lactose-free variants. Other sugar-free and reduced-sugar white chocolate products use sorbitol or fructose instead. A reduced-sugar white chocolate bar named Milkybar Wowsomes was released by Nestlé in 2018. Wowsomes contained sugar crystals modified to be hollow, reducing the bar's overall sugar content by almost a third. The chocolate sold poorly and was discontinued after less than two years.

Vegan white chocolates substitute rice flour for milk powder. Another variation, blond chocolate, is made by slowly heating white chocolate, triggering Maillard reactions and creating a chocolate with a light caramel flavor. Replacing cocoa butter entirely with vegetable fat produces compound chocolate, sold as 'white chocolate coating', which is more common in the US than Europe. It has a pure white appearance. White chocolate products are often flavored with green tea, particularly matcha, as well as coconut, strawberry, coffee, pistachio and almond.

White chocolates made by craft chocolate makers exhibit large differences from mass-produced white chocolates. Some craft chocolate makers substitute other ingredients for those typically used in white chocolate, such as goat milk for dairy milk, and non-deodorized cocoa butter instead of a deodorized product. Others add unusual ingredients, creating white chocolates with flavors including Thai shrimp curry, rosemary and sea salt and vegetables such as kale and broccoli. As of 2019, many bean-to-bar chocolate manufacturers in France and Spain produced white chocolate, in addition to the more typical milk and dark types.

== See also ==
- Belgian chocolate
- List of chocolate bar brands
- Swiss chocolate

== Sources ==
=== Books ===
- Audretsch, David B.; Lehmann, Erik E.; Wirsching, Katharine (2017). "Female immigrant entrepreneurship in Germany". In Link, Albert N (ed.). Gender and Entrepreneurial Activity. Business 2017. Cheltenham, Gloucestershire: Edward Elgar Publishing. doi:10.4337/9781785364747.00007. ISBN 978-1-78536-473-0.
- Bau, Frédéric (2006). Chocolate Fusion: Chocolate in Cuisine (2nd English ed.). Barcelona: Montagud Editores. ISBN 978-84-7212-117-1.
- Beckett, Stephen T. (2019). The Science of Chocolate (3rd ed.). Croydon, Greater London: Royal Society of Chemistry. ISBN 978-1-78801-235-5.
- Beckett, Stephen T.; Fowler, Mark S.; Ziegler, Gregory R., eds. (2017). Beckett's Industrial Chocolate Manufacture and Use (5th ed.). Chichester, West Sussex: Wiley. ISBN 978-1-118-78014-5.
  - Beckett, Stephen T.; Paggios, Konstantinos; Roberts, Ian. "Conching". In Beckett, Fowler & Ziegler (2017).
  - Gray, Michael P.; Máñez-Cortell, Ángel. "Moulding, enrobing and cooling chocolate products". In Beckett, Fowler & Ziegler (2017).
  - Jewett, Sophie. "Artisan chocolate making". In Beckett, Fowler & Ziegler (2017).
  - Jones, Carl E. "Packaging". In Beckett, Fowler & Ziegler (2017).
  - Kamphuis, Henri J.; Fowler, Mark S. "Production of cocoa mass, cocoa butter and cocoa powder". In Beckett, Fowler & Ziegler (2017).
  - Lambert, Joshua D. "Nutritional and health aspects of chocolate". In Beckett, Fowler & Ziegler (2017).
  - Skytte, Ulla P.; Kaylegian, Kerry E. "Ingredients from milk". In Beckett, Fowler & Ziegler (2017).
  - Stauffer, Marlene B. "Quality control and shelf life". In Beckett, Fowler & Ziegler (2017).
  - Talbot, Geoff. "Properties of cocoa butter and vegetable fats". In Beckett, Fowler & Ziegler (2017).
  - Thomas, Jonathan. "The global chocolate confectionery market". In Beckett, Fowler & Ziegler (2017).
  - Walker, John H. "Bulk chocolate handling". In Beckett, Fowler & Ziegler (2017).
  - Wells, Martin A. "Chocolate crumb". In Beckett, Fowler & Ziegler (2017).
  - Wohlmuth, Edward G. "Recipes". In Beckett, Fowler & Ziegler (2017).
  - Wood, Richard. "Legal aspects of chocolate manufacture". In Beckett, Fowler & Ziegler (2017).
- Duhart, Frédéric (2019). "Les goûts du chocolat au Pays Basque. D'hier à aujourd'hui." [The tastes of chocolate in the Basque Country. From yesterday to today.]. In Marcilhac, Vincent; Tibère, Valentine (eds.). Les Goûts du Chocolat Dans le Monde [Tastes of chocolate around the world] (in French). Paris: L'Harmattan. ISBN 978-2-34318-423-4.
- Fitzgerald, Robert (1995). Rowntree and the Marketing Revolution, 1862–1969. Cambridge, Cambridgeshire: Cambridge University Press. ISBN 978-0-521-43512-3.
- Goldstein, Darra, ed. (2015). The Oxford Companion to Sugar and Sweets. New York: Oxford University Press. ISBN 978-0-19-931339-6.
  - di Schino, June. "Biscotti". In Goldstein (2015).
  - Leaf, Alexandra. "Valrhona". In Goldstein (2015).
  - Thorn, Bret. "Plated desserts". In Goldstein (2015).
  - Tooker, Poppy. "New Orleans". In Goldstein (2015).
  - Wemischner, Robert. "Sauce". In Goldstein (2015).
- Greweling, Peter P. (2013). Chocolates & Confections: Formula, Theory, and Technique for the Artisan Confectioner (2nd ed.). Hoboken, New Jersey: John Wiley & Sons. ISBN 978-0-470-42441-4.
- Hartel, Richard W.; von Elbe, Joachim H.; Hofberger, Randy (2018). Confectionery Science and Technology. Cham, Zug: Springer Publishing. doi:10.1007/978-3-319-61742-8. ISBN 978-3-31961-742-8.
- Hermé, Pierre (2005). Larousse du Chocolat [The Chocolate Larousse] (in French). Paris: Éditions Larousse. ISBN 978-2-03-560372-2.
- Hofberger, Randall; Tanabe, Nina Ann (2007). "Chocolate and cocoa". In Hui, Y. H. (ed.). Handbook of Food Products Manufacturing. Hoboken, New Jersey: Wiley. ISBN 978-0-470-04964-8.
- Hori, G. Victor Sögen (1998). "Japanese Zen in America: Americanizing the face in the mirror". In Prebish, Charles S.; Tanaka, Kenneth K. (eds.). The Faces of Buddhism in America. Berkley: University of California Press. pp. 49–78. doi:10.1525/9780520920651-005. ISBN 978-0-52092-065-1.
- Lebovitz, David (2004). The Great Book of Chocolate. Berkeley, California: Ten Speed Press. ISBN 978-1-60774-239-5.
- Leissle, Kristy (2018). Cocoa. Cambridge, Cambridgeshire: Polity. ISBN 978-1-50951-320-8.
- Long-Solís, Janet; Vargas, Luis Alberto (2005). Food Culture in Mexico. Food Culture around the World. Westport, Connecticut: Greenwood Publishing Group. ISBN 978-0-313-32431-4.
- Lovegren, Sylvia (1995). Fashionable Food: Seven Decades of Food Fads. New York: Macmillan. ISBN 978-0-02-575705-9.
- Lovegren, Sylvia (2013). "Historical overview". In Smith, Andrew F (ed.). The Oxford Encyclopedia of Food and Drink in America (2nd ed.). New York: Oxford University Press. ISBN 978-0-19973-922-6.
- Marsh, Shona; Rummel, Florian (2024). "Rheometry and rheological characterisation". In Rosenthal, Andrew J; Chen, Jianshe (eds.). Food Texturology: Measurement and Perception of Food Textural Properties (2nd ed.). Cham, Zug: Springer Publishing. ISBN 978-3-03141-900-3.
- Mathuravalli, S. M. D. (2022). Handbook of Bakery and Confectionery. Abingdon, Oxfordshire and Delhi, India: CRC Press. ISBN 978-1-032-15126-7.
- Pardek, Carina; Bohne, Hartwig [in German] (2024). "Hospitality in harmony: Mergers of tea and chocolate". In Bohne, Hartwig (ed.). Tea Cultures of Europe: Heritage and Hospitality. Berlin: De Gruyter. doi:10.1515/9783110758573-009. ISBN 978-3-11075-857-3.
- Presilla, Maricel E. (2001). The New Taste of Chocolate: A Cultural and Natural History of Cacao with Recipes (1st ed.). Berkeley, California: Ten Speed Press. ISBN 978-1-58008-143-6.
- Splane, Emily Crews; Rowland, Neil E.; Mitra, Anaya (2025). Psychology of Eating: From Biology to Culture to Policy (3rd ed.). New York: Taylor & Francis. ISBN 978-1-032-62138-8.
- The Culinary Institute of America (2016). Baking and Pastry: Mastering the Art and Craft (3rd ed.). Hoboken, New Jersey: Wiley. ISBN 978-0-47092-865-3.

=== Journal articles ===
- Aydın, Nurcanan; Kian-Pour, Nasim; Toker, Omer Said (2021). "Caramelized white chocolate: effects of production process on quality parameters". Journal of Food Measurement and Characterization. 15 (4): 3182–3194. doi:10.1007/s11694-021-00890-1.
- Beckett, Stephen T. (August 2003). "Is the taste of British milk chocolate different?". International Journal of Dairy Technology. 56 (3): 139–142. doi:10.1046/j.1471-0307.2003.00099.x.
- Cadby, Jeana; Araki, Tetsuya (March 2022). "The recent rise of craft chocolate in Japan: A 2019 snapshot". Journal of Agriculture and Food Research. 7 100273. doi:10.1016/j.jafr.2022.100273.
- Creighton, Millie R. (Winter 1993). "'Sweet love' and women's place: Valentine's Day, Japan style". The Journal of Popular Culture. 27 (3): 1–19. doi:10.1111/j.0022-3840.1993.00001.x. ProQuest 1297339767.
- "FDA proposes standard of identity for white chocolate". Inside Washington's FDA Week. 3 (15): 13–14. 11 April 1997. JSTOR 26676517.
- Fenton, James (March 1937). "The misleading and deceptive labelling of food". British Food Journal. 39 (3). doi:10.1108/eb011304.
- Hashimoto, Rie (February 2019). "北海道スイーツ企業の売上高推移と上位企業の戦略の方向性" [Trends in Sales of Hokkaido Sweets Companies and Strategies of Top Sales Companies]. 北海商科大学論集 (in Japanese). 8 (1). Archived (PDF) from the original on 1 June 2025.
- Hayward, Keith (2013). "'Life stage dissolution' in Anglo-American advertising and popular culture: kidults, lil' Britneys and middle youths". The Sociological Review. 61 (3): 525–548. doi:10.1111/1467-954X.12032.
- Hyde, Dana; Ellert, James; Killing, J. Peter (March 1991). "The Nestlé takeover of Rowntree: A case study". European Management Journal. 9 (1): 1–17. doi:10.1016/0263-2373(91)90044-Q.
- Liu, Binkai; Zong, Geng; Zhu, Lu; Hu, Yang; Manson, JoAnn E.; Wang, Molin; Rimm, Eric B.; Hu, Frank B; Sun, Qi (5 October 2024). "Chocolate intake and risk of type 2 diabetes: prospective cohort studies". The BMJ. 387. e078386. doi:10.1136/bmj-2023-078386. PMC 11616007. PMID 39631943.
- Nichter, Mark; Nichter, Mimi (1991). "Hype and weight". Medical Anthropology. 13 (3): 249–284. doi:10.1080/01459740.1991.9966051. PMID 1961105.
- Perusset, Alain (2022). "Éléments de sémiotique catégorielle: Théorie, méthode, schémas et pratique" [Elements of categorial semiotic: Theory, method, diagrams and practice]. Actes Sémiotiques (in French). 126 (126). doi:10.25965/as.7443. Archived from the original on 26 November 2022.
- Seiler, H. E. (September 1937). "Diet and nutrition: A survey of recent work". The British Food Journal. 39 (9). doi:10.1108/eb011310.
- Spence, Charles; Wang, Qian Janice; Youssef, Jozef (2017). "Pairing flavours and the temporal order of tasting". Flavour. 6 (4) 4. doi:10.1186/s13411-017-0053-0.
- Tan, Terence Yew Chin; Lim, Xin Yi; Yeo, Julie Hsiao Hui; Lee, Shaun Wen Huey; Lai, Nai Ming (24 August 2021). "The health effects of chocolate and cocoa: A systematic review". Nutrients. 13 (9): 2909. doi:10.3390/nu13092909. PMC 8470865. PMID 34578786.
- Vercet, Antonio (June 2003). "Browning of white chocolate during storage". Food Chemistry. 81 (3): 371–377. doi:10.1016/S0308-8146(02)00452-1.
- Yip, George S.; Coundouriotis, George A. (1991). "Diagnosing global strategy potential: The world chocolate confectionery industry". Planning Review. 19 (1): 4–14. doi:10.1108/eb054314.
- Zarantonello, Lia; Luomala, Harri T. (18 January 2011). "Dear Mr Chocolate: Constructing a typology of contextualized chocolate consumption experiences through qualitative diary research". Qualitative Market Research. 14 (1). doi:10.1108/13522751111099328.
- Zellner, Debra A.; Garriga-Trillo, Ana; Rohm, E.; Centeno, S.; Parker, S. (August 1999). "Food liking and craving: A cross-cultural approach". Appetite. 33 (1): 61–70. doi:10.1006/appe.1999.0234. PMID 10447980.

=== News and magazine articles ===
- Baker, Rosie (2 August 2010). "Nestlé targets adults with Milkybar range". Marketing Week. Archived from the original on 22 January 2025.
- Boffey, Daniel (7 May 2021). "E171: EU watchdog says food colouring widely used in UK is unsafe". The Guardian. Archived from the original on 25 November 2024.
- Dizik, Alina (26 December 2013). "White chocolate, a blank slate for flavor, wins converts". The Wall Street Journal.
- Dowling, Tim (8 March 2002). "White is the new brown". The Guardian. Archived from the original on 25 September 2024.
- "Dunkle begierde" [Dark desire]. Der Spiegel (in German). 12 December 1984. Archived from the original on 3 March 2026.
- Ferdman, Robert A. (11 February 2014). "Charts: Where in the world people actually like white chocolate". Quartz. Archived from the original on 7 February 2025.
- Ferdman, Robert A.; Yanofsky, David (4 April 2014). "What people order at Starbucks around the United States". Quartz. Archived from the original on 21 January 2025.
- Gersema, Emily (2 February 2003). "New FDA standard won't allow fudging on white chocolate". Orlando Sentinel. ProQuest 279814820.
- "Goodbye E171: The EU bans titanium dioxide as a food additive". European Commission. 18 January 2022. Archived from the original on 4 February 2025.
- Kummer, Corby (21 December 1988). "America is going sweet on white chocolate". The New York Times. Archived from the original on 5 July 2018.
- Lodian, L. (1 December 1917). "The inner men of armies: Some of the foods of high concentration on which battles are fought". Scientific American. Vol. 117. pp. 409, 429.
- Marchetti, Silvia (9 November 2019). "How white chocolate evolved from a coating for kids' medicine into a sweet, creamy treat". South China Morning Post. Archived from the original on 23 October 2022.
- Margen, Sheldon; Ogar, Dale A. (1 February 1999). "Chocolate's not so bad for you, after all". Los Angeles Times. Archived from the original on 15 September 2025.
- Murray, Matt (13 April 2001). "It gets mixed reviews, but white chocolate works in easter bunnies — Trouble is, gourmets disdain it, and some of it is fake; that waxy crisco flavor". The Wall Street Journal. ProQuest 398805520.
- "Nestle axes low sugar chocolate due to weak sales". BBC. 13 February 2020. Archived from the original on 26 November 2023.
- Nieburg, Oliver (10 October 2016). "Vegetable fats in chocolate threaten artisans, says MEP". Confectionery News. William Reed Ltd. Archived from the original on 8 November 2024.
- Plant, Fiona (20 March 1992). "A sweet for Milky Bar adults". Campaign. Gale A12105638.
- Rousseau, Daphné (28 March 2024). "Blond vs pink: French-Swiss battle for 'fourth' chocolate". Agence France-Presse. Archived from the original on 3 April 2024.
- Sethi, Simran (27 November 2017). "For those who think white chocolate isn't 'real' chocolate, have we got bars for you". The Washington Post. Archived from the original on 2 July 2024.
- Sherred, Kristine (17 May 2019). "White chocolate market poised to grow by $1.8bn in next five years". Confectionery News. William Reed Ltd. Archived from the original on 19 February 2026.
- "This year's 'hot' chocolate turns out to be white". St. Petersburg Times. Associated Press. 3 May 1990. p. 17D. ProQuest 262746350.
- Trieger Kurland, Ann (27 June 2017). "Hebert Candies marks 100 years of yum". The Boston Globe. Archived from the original on 6 December 2017.
- Twilley, Nicola (21 September 2020). "The race to redesign sugar". The New Yorker. Archived from the original on 12 March 2026.
- Wallop, Harry (16 February 2015). "The 9 most memorable chocolate adverts". The Telegraph. Archived from the original on 15 September 2025.
- "White chocolate: Consumers take notice". Candy & Snack Today. 6 October 2022. Archived from the original on 4 December 2024.
- "White chocolate turns white hot this holiday season". Chicago Tribune. 11 December 1986. Archived from the original on 12 March 2025.
- Young, Daniel (13 May 2009). "Matcha's green tea powder and chocolate: a bitter-sweet combo". Los Angeles Times. Archived from the original on 15 September 2025.

=== Other ===
- Caines, Richard (30 September 2023). Chocolate Confectionery – UK – 2023 (Report). Mintel.
- "EU trade since 1988 by HS2-4-6 and CN8 [ds-045409__custom_15384806] Imports". Eurostat.
- "EU trade since 1988 by HS2-4-6 and CN8 [ds-045409__custom_15384806] Exports". Eurostat.
- Falkowitz, Max (4 April 2019). "The best white chocolate, dessert's delicious underdog". Serious Eats. Archived from the original on 13 February 2025.
- Lebovitz, David (5 February 2006). "What is white chocolate?". david lebovitz. Archived from the original on 17 September 2024.
- Olsen, Kelsey (18 June 2024). Chocolate confectionery – US – 2024 (Report). Mintel.
- Peppler, Rebekah (31 March 2021). "Sablés (But not, like, regular sablés, cool sablés)". Los Angeles Times. Archived from the original on 29 February 2024.
- "Table 4-7 Comparison of Potassium Adequate intakes established in this report to Potassium adequate intakes established in the 2005 DRI report". 5 March 2019. p. 120. In: Stallings, Virginia A.; Harrison, Meghan; Oria, Maria, eds. (2019). "Potassium: Dietary reference intakes for adequacy". Dietary Reference Intakes for Sodium and Potassium. pp. 101–124. Bibcode:2019nap..book25353N. doi:10.17226/25353. ISBN 978-0-309-48834-1. PMID 30844154. NCBI NBK545428.
- "The Milkybar story". Nestlé. Archived from the original on 20 February 2023.
- United States Food and Drug Administration (2024). "Daily value on the nutrition and supplement facts labels". FDA. Archived from the original on 27 March 2024.
- "white chocolate". Oxford English Dictionary (online ed.). Oxford University Press. doi:10.1093/OED/6380903128. (Subscription or participating institution membership required.)
