= Glossary of chocolate terms =

This is a list of selected terms, phrases, and other jargon used about chocolate, along with their definitions. Terms used around chocolate, in particular its industry, are varied and can be complicated.

== A ==
Artisan chocolate
Chocolate made by an artisan. The descriptor is also used by non-artisan brands to invoke a sense of community in consumers.

== B ==
Bar
A solid, shaped food containing chocolate. In the US and Canada, chocolate bar refers to solid chocolate, with or without inclusions. In other countries, a chocolate bar can comprise layered components coated in chocolate; what is known in the US and Canada as a candy bar.
Bark
A large, flat piece of chocolate. It is formed by breaking a very large piece of chocolate, creating an irregular shape. It is sometimes topped with inclusions.
Bean to bar
A way of making chocolate starting from dry, uncracked specialty cocoa beans which they roast lightly. Bean-to-bar manufacturers do not add vanilla or lecithin and generally produce in batches smaller than 500 kg.

== C ==
Cacao
Refers to the tree Theobroma cacao and its seeds, both in their raw form and prepared into food and drink. Referring to items using cacao rather than its anglicized form, cocoa, is important among craft and associated chocolate communities to assert difference from bulk production.
CCN-51
A variety of cocoa bean which was one of the most popular as of 2015. At that time it was controversial among advocates of flavor cocoa and supported by large chocolate manufacturers as a solution to growing chocolate demand. CCN-51 beans have a fruity and acidic flavor.
Cocoa
Refers to the tree Theobroma cacao and its seeds. Cocoa is especially used to refer to the latter as a commodity. According to food historian Sophie Coe, in the cacao/cocoa trade, cacao refers to the seeds while they remain in the pods, and as they ferment and dry, and cocoa refers to the seeds after that point, now processed.
Conching
A process whereby semi-finished chocolate is heated and agitated, aerating the product. This liquifies it and removes harsh flavors.
Cracking
The act of breaking cocoa beans into husk and nibs
Craft chocolate
Chocolate made bean to bar. As of 2024, there is ongoing debate among industry stakeholders and academics over craft chocolate's definition.
Crumb
A dairy-based ingredient used in some milk chocolates, made by reducing sweetened condensed milk and finely milled cocoa nibs.
Cut test
Quality test for cocoa beans. A set of beans are cut lengthwise to check for underfermentation, mold, germination, or insect damage or to see if they lack nibs.

== D ==
Drinking chocolate
Some chocolate is designed to melt in water, milk and milk alternatives. This chocolate and the drinks it produces are referred to as drinking chocolate.

== E ==
Engross
The process of creating multiple layers during panning

== F ==
Fèves
Small, bean-shaped chocolates, each with a small indentation to facilitate melting

== I ==
Inclusions
Flavorful items (e.g. citrus pieces, cacao nibs) mixed in to chocolate.
Industrial chocolate maker
Producers who roast non-specialty cocoa beans at high temperatures with added cocoa butter, in batches generally over two tonnes. Chocolate made in batches of between 500 and 2000 kg is typically considered semi-industrial.

== N ==
Nib
Pieces of a cocoa bean's broken cotyledon.

== P ==
Pistole
Small, disk-shaped chocolates used by professional bakers to give more precision in weighing and tempering.

== R ==
Rocher
A clump of nuts set together with chocolate. They sometimes contain low-moisture inclusions.

== S ==
Seizure
A failure in chocolate manufacture, when some water or polyol contaminates molten chocolate, producing a solid, unusable mass. The contaminants dissolve sugar, which binds to other particles.
Specialty cacao
Cacao processed from seed to cocoa bean with efforts towards ensuring quality product present at each step of production. There is no official industry standard to determine if and to what degree cacao should be deemed specialty, but there are several tests in use with overlapping criteria, including lacking defects, a pleasing taste and aroma, and traceability.

== T ==
Tablet
Plural tablettes. See bar.
Traditional chocolate maker
Chocolate maker who makes far less than industrial chocolate makers, using techniques of a high roast and adding cocoa butter, and generally lecithin and vanilla.

== Sources ==
- Anderson, Rob; Seguine, Ed; Guittard, Clark (November 28, 2022). "Conching". Fine Chocolate Industry Association. Archived from the original on January 16, 2025.
- Barbieri, Annalisa (July 25, 2021). "Notes on chocolate: the little extras that make some white bars special". The Guardian. Archived from the original on November 29, 2022.
- Chau, Albert; Gensler, George; Lewis, Judith (March 31, 2023). "Chocolate Bar". Fine Chocolate Industry Association. Archived from the original on November 13, 2024.
- Coe, Sophie (1989). "The Maya Chocolate Pot and Its Descendants". In Jaine, Tom (ed.). Oxford Symposium on Food & Cookery, 1988: The Cooking Pot. London: Prospect Books. ISBN 0-907-32542-4.
- Delaet, Katrien (April 16, 2023). "Cacao, Specialty". Fine Chocolate Industry Association. Archived from the original on January 17, 2025.
- Doutre-Roussel, Chloé (November 28, 2022). "Chocolate Maker". Fine Chocolate Industry Association. Archived from the original on January 16, 2025.
- Fowler, Mark S; Coutel, Fabien (2017). "Cocoa beans: from tree to factory". In Beckett, Stephen T; Fowler, Mark S; Ziegler, Gregory R (eds.). Beckett's Industrial Chocolate Manufacture and Use (5th ed.). West Sussex, UK: Wiley. ISBN 9781118780145.
- Greweling, Peter P (2013). Chocolates & Confections: Formula, Theory, and Technique for the Artisan Confectioner (2nd ed.). Hoboken, New Jersey: John Wiley & Sons. ISBN 978-0-470-42441-4.
- Lebovitz, David (2004). The Great Book of Chocolate. Berkeley, California: Ten Speed Press. ISBN 978-1-60774-239-5.
- Leissle, Kristy (20 January 2017). ""Artisan" as Brand: Adding Value In A Craft Chocolate Community". Food, Culture & Society. 20 (1): 37–57. doi:10.1080/15528014.2016.1272201.
- Lucumi-Mosquera, Lina (2024). "Unwrapping oppression: Black latinas in craft chocolate marketing". Identities: 1–19. doi:10.1080/1070289X.2024.2424698.
- Mancini Cenobio, María (May 27, 2023). "Chocolate, Drinking". Fine Chocolate Industry Association. Archived from the original on December 5, 2024.
- Martin, Carla D; Sampeck, Kathryn E (2015). "The bitter and sweet of chocolate in Europe". Socio.hu Social Science Review. 5 (SI3): 37–60. doi:10.18030/socio.hu.2015en.37. eISSN 2063-0468.
- Martin, Carla D; Sampeck, Kathryn (November 1, 2022). "Cacao". Fine Chocolate Industry Association. Archived from the original on March 1, 2025.
- Masonis, Todd; D'Alesandre, Greg; Vega, Lisa; Gore, Molly (2017). Making Chocolate: From Bean to Bar to S'more. New York: Clarkson Potter. ISBN 978-0-451-49535-8.
- Myers, Anthony (February 20, 2023). "You say 'CACAO' – I say 'COCOA': Fine Chocolate Glossary aims to clear up confusion surrounding chocolate nomenclature". Confectionery News.
- Kennedy, Alicia (30 October 2020). "A Conversation with Carla Martin". From the Desk of Alicia Kennedy. Archived from the original on 18 April 2024.
- Pacyniak, Bernard (January 2016). ""Doing our best to be the best"". Candy Industry. 181 (1). ProQuest 1758650192.
- Suri, Twinkle; Basu, Santanu (2022). "Heat resistant chocolate development for subtropical and tropical climates: a review". Critical Reviews in Food Science and Nutrition. 62 (20): 5603–5622. doi:10.1080/10408398.2021.1888690. PMID 33635177.
- Ziegler, Gregory A; Beckett, Stephen T (2022). "Milk chocolate". In McSweeney, Paul LH; McNamara, John P (eds.). Encyclopedia of Dairy Sciences (3rd ed.). Elsevier. ISBN 978-0-12-818767-8.
