= World Cocoa Foundation =

Trade group

- Formation: 2000
- Headquarters: 1025 Connecticut Avenue NW, Suite 1205, Washington, DC 20036
- Location: Washington, D.C. (Headquarters) Abidjan, Côte d’Ivoire (Country Office) Accra, Ghana (Country Office)
- Region served: Worldwide
- Members: 90+ member companies
- Chairman: Tricia Brannigan
- Website: www.worldcocoafoundation.org

The World Cocoa Foundation (WCF) is an international membership organization in the cocoa and chocolate sector. Its members include farmer cooperatives, cocoa processors, traders, chocolate manufacturers and other companies involved in the cocoa supply chain. Founded in 2000 and headquartered in Washington, D.C., the organization works with companies, producer organizations, governments and other institutions on issues affecting cocoa production and trade.

WCF's programs address issues including farmer income, labor practices, deforestation and supply-chain traceability. It is a partner in the Cocoa & Forests Initiative, which was launched in 2017 by the governments of Côte d'Ivoire and Ghana together with WCF, IDH and participating cocoa and chocolate companies. WCF has also participated in the development of the Cocoa Household Income Study Methodology, a standardized framework for measuring cocoa-farming household income. Its other activities include the development of methodologies for greenhouse-gas accounting, traceability and deforestation-risk assessment, including tools intended to support compliance with the European Union Deforestation Regulation.

== History ==
The World Cocoa Foundation had its roots as a 1995 initiative of the Chocolate Manufacturers Association (CMA) called the International Cocoa Research and Education Foundation, which was later renamed the World Cocoa Foundation on August 14, 2000. The CMA itself was later dissolved in 2008 and became part of the National Confectioners Association.

The 2022 Cocoa Barometer noted the lack of diversity in WCF's board. “Of the sixteen board members of the World Cocoa Foundation, not one is from West Africa. None are black.”

== Operations and role ==
The World Cocoa Foundation (WCF) functions primarily as an industry association and coordinating organization within the cocoa and chocolate sector. It works with companies, producer organizations, governments, civil-society groups and international institutions on sustainability policies, shared methodologies and reporting frameworks.

The organization's activities are primarily concentrated in major West African and other cocoa-producing nations, where it coordinates public-private initiatives involving local governments and state-run marketing boards. Through these partnerships, the WCF establishes frameworks for tracking supply chain metrics, including deforestation tracking and child labor remediation data, which are then utilized by its member corporations.

== Industry initiatives ==
=== CocoaAction (2014–2019) ===
In June 2014, the WCF launched CocoaAction, a voluntary strategy intended to coordinate the sustainability and supply-chain programs of participating chocolate manufacturers and cocoa processors, including Mars, Nestlé, Hershey's and Barry Callebaut. The initiative focused on smallholder cocoa farmers in Côte d’Ivoire and Ghana and included measures related to agricultural productivity and community development. A KPMG evaluation found that the strategy had limited input from external stakeholders and identified limited local ownership by the governments of Côte d’Ivoire and Ghana. CocoaAction concluded in 2019, after five years of operation.

=== Child labor monitoring and criticism ===
The WCF has represented cocoa and chocolate companies in industry initiatives addressing child labor in the cocoa sectors of Côte d'Ivoire and Ghana. In September 2001, chocolate manufacturers and industry representatives signed the Harkin–Engel Protocol, a voluntary agreement intended to address the worst forms of child labor, as defined by ILO Convention No. 182. The cocoa industry subsequently failed to meet several deadlines and reduction targets established under the protocol and later action plans. One civil-society estimate calculated that major cocoa and chocolate companies spent approximately 0.1% of their annual sales revenue on measures addressing child labor. At its 2019 Partnership Meeting in Berlin, WCF announced an initiative called "Children First", which proposed eliminating child labor from cocoa supply chains by 2025; according to subsequent civil-society reporting, the initiative was not formally launched.

A 2020 study conducted by NORC at the University of Chicago for the United States Department of Labor estimated that 1.56 million children were engaged in child labor in cocoa production in Côte d'Ivoire and Ghana, including approximately 1.48 million engaged in hazardous work. NORC reported an increase in hazardous child labor over the 2008–09 to 2018–19 period, while noting methodological limitations affecting comparisons between survey rounds and differences in trends between high-, medium- and low-production areas. Responding to the study, WCF president Richard Scobey said that earlier reduction targets had been established without fully accounting for the scale and complexity of child labor in cocoa-producing communities or the increase in cocoa production during the period.

Media investigations have also reported child labor within cocoa supply chains linked to WCF member companies. A 2022 Channel 4 ''Dispatches'' investigation reported children performing hazardous work on Ghanaian farms participating in Mondelēz International's Cocoa Life program. In 2023, CBS News reported finding children, including some as young as five, working on farms in Ghana that supplied cocoa to Mars. WCF has described child labor as an issue requiring coordinated action by industry, governments, civil society and cocoa-growing communities. Sector frameworks involving the organization have included measures relating to education, social protection, household income and coordination between company-operated child-labor monitoring systems and national child-protection systems.

=== Farmer income and economic initiatives ===
The WCF participates in programs concerning farm productivity, crop diversification and alternative sources of household income for cocoa farmers. In 2024, it co-developed the Cocoa Household Income Study Methodology (CHIS) with partners including the German Federal Ministry for Economic Cooperation and Development (BMZ) and the Swiss Platform for Sustainable Cocoa (SWISSCO).

Research on cocoa-producing households in Côte d'Ivoire and Ghana has identified cocoa prices, yields, household size, the area of land under cocoa cultivation and income from non-cocoa sources as factors affecting household income. A 2021 study based on six household datasets found that most cocoa-producing households surveyed did not reach the Living Income benchmark, with lower-income households generally having lower yields, less available land and greater dependence on cocoa income. The ''Cocoa Barometer 2020'', published by a consortium of civil-society organisations, identified price formation, the distribution of value within the cocoa supply chain and farmers' bargaining power among the structural issues affecting farmer incomes. The report also noted that Côte d'Ivoire and Ghana introduced a Living Income Differential of US$400 per tonne on cocoa for the 2020–2021 season as part of efforts to raise farm-gate prices.
