= Pact Coffee =

British coffee company

Pact Coffee, formerly known as YourGrind, is a British speciality coffee company established in 2012 by Stephen Rapoport. The company sells speciality-grade coffee, which it sources directly from coffee farmers in Central and South America, as well as East Africa.

Pact Coffee supplies coffee directly to customers, through subscription, as well as to hospitality venues, offices, and supermarkets.

== History ==
In October 2012, Stephen Rapoport founded YourGrind with an aim to make fresh speciality-grade coffee available to a broader audience. The company started its operations by offering coffee through subscriptions and its online store.

Initially, Rapoport ground the coffee in his kitchen and dispatched the bags through his local post office. In June 2013, with £500,000 in seed funding, the company relocated to an office space in Bermondsey, South London, and rebranded as Pact Coffee.

Will Corby joined the following year as Head of Coffee and established Pact Coffee's sourcing program. Pact began operating with a direct-trade supply chain model, procuring coffee directly from farmers and importing it to a newly established coffee roastery next to the London office.

Paul Turton assumed the role of CEO, in 2017, with a focus on the company's business-to-business channel, Pact at Work (now Pact Coffee for Business), supplying offices with coffee. In 2018, the company expanded into a larger roastery in Haslemere, Surrey, while maintaining its head office in Bermondsey.

Pact Coffee achieved B Corporation certification in 2022 and began supplying coffee to Waitrose, Whole Foods Market, Ocado, and Gopuff in 2023.

In May 2025, the company pledged to source a minimum 50% of its coffee from women or gender-equity groups, and, for the entirety of March 2026, it sourced 100% of its core range from women-run farms. The activity coincided with the launch of its Equal Ground Project, which works for gender equity in the coffee industry.. The company recertified as a B Corp, with a B Impact Score of 106.6 points, in November 2025.

In September 2026, Pact paid the highest price ever recorded for a coffee from the Democratic Republic of the Congo. The coffee was Izuba, made by Yetu Qahwah, and Pact paid $55.50 per kilo, which was double the previous record for a Congolese coffee.

== Awards ==
Pact Coffee was awarded 11 Great Taste Awards from The Guild of Fine Food from 2022-2024.

The company won the gold award for Sustainable Ingredient at the Sustainable Food Awards, in 2024, in recognition for its work in bringing the Arabica variety, Cenicafé 1, to market for the first time. The work was done in collaboration with the National Federation of Coffee Growers of Colombia and the Cenicafé Research Centre.
