= Mostaccioli =

Mostaccioli may refer to:

- Mustacciuoli or mostaccioli, a pastry originating in the Naples region of Italy
- an English-language name for a variation of penne pasta
