= Askinosie Chocolate =

American chocolate manufacturer

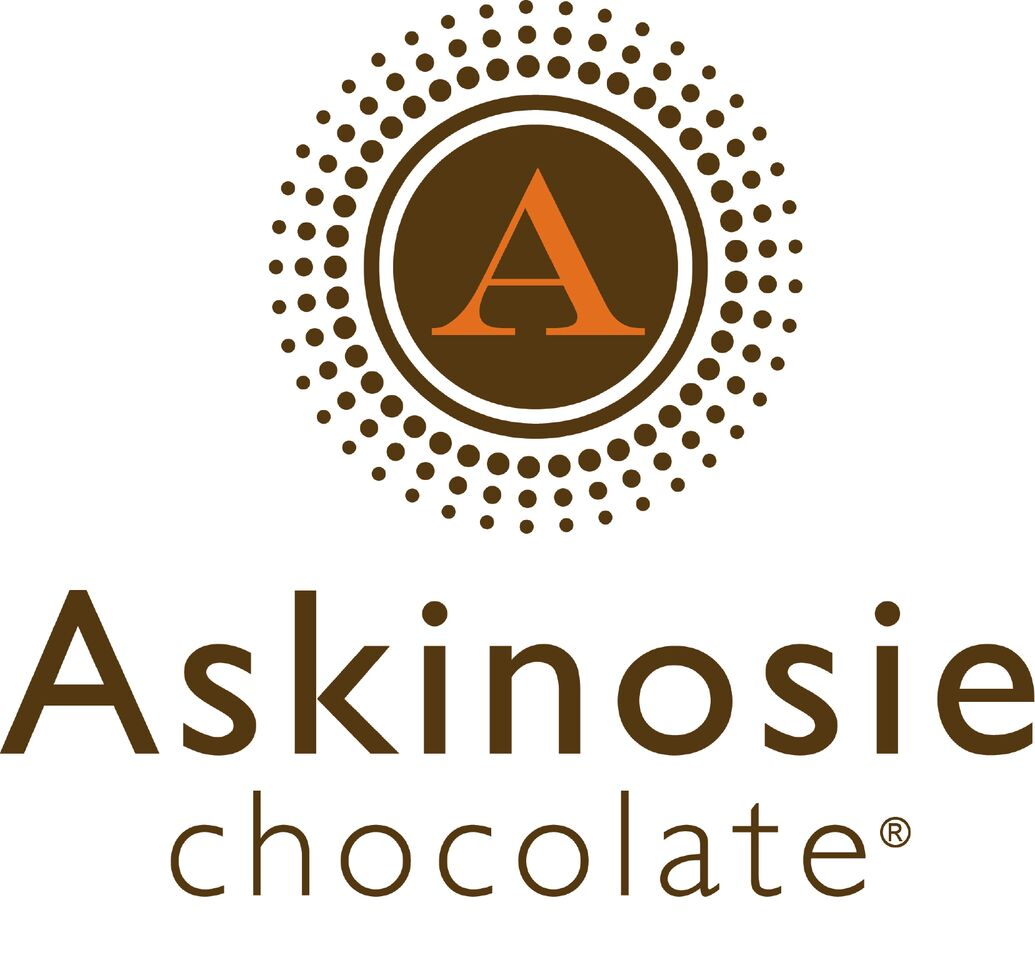
- Industry: Bean to Bar Chocolate
- Founded: May 2007; 18 years ago
- Founder: Shawn Askinosie
- Products: Single Origin Chocolate
- Website: askinosie.com

Askinosie Chocolate is a small batch, bean-to-bar chocolate manufacturer based in Springfield, Missouri.

== History ==
Shawn Askinosie, founder and chocolate maker at Askinosie Chocolate, spent nearly 20 years as a criminal defense attorney before he started making chocolate. In 2007 he sold his first chocolate bar and Askinosie Chocolate began.

== Corporate affairs ==
Askinosie practices direct trade, which insures lasting relationships with the cocoa farmer co-ops and encourages the highest possible quality. Profit sharing, above fair trade pricing and open accounting have been fixtures of the business since its inception. This is largely accredited to Jack Stack's 2002 book A Stake in the Outcome which proposes "a company with a strong culture of ownership" in order to foster participation and increase personnel efficiency.

== Products ==
Askinosie Chocolate bars are made from 100% traceable, single-origin cocoa beans from four regions: San Jose Del Tambo, Ecuador: Zamora, Ecuador; Davao, Philippines; and Mababu, Tanzania. Though specializing in dark chocolate bars, their product line includes dark milk chocolate, white chocolate made from scratch, all natural cocoa powder, roasted cocoa nibs and chocolate hazelnut spread. Their new CollaBARation line has various craft, artisan food manufacturers’ products in their dark chocolate bars.

=== Sustainable Nutrition Programs ===
During one of Shawn’s bean sourcing trips in Davao, Philippines, he learned of a nutrition problem at the village’s Malagos Elementary School, where many of the students suffer from malnutrition. In an effort to meet this need, Askinosie Chocolate began a sustainable nutrition program by selling Tableya, a traditional Filipino hot chocolate beverage made of roasted cocoa beans that are milled into tablets. The PTA of Malagos Elementary produced Tableya and shipped them to Springfield, MO in the same container the cocoa beans were shipped. 100% of the sales from Tableya went to provide meals for the students at Malagos. Each package provides 232 meals, which will be purchased from disaster relief organization, Convoy of Hope, and prepared by the school’s PTA.

== See also ==
- List of bean-to-bar chocolate manufacturers
