= Taza Chocolate =

American chocolate company

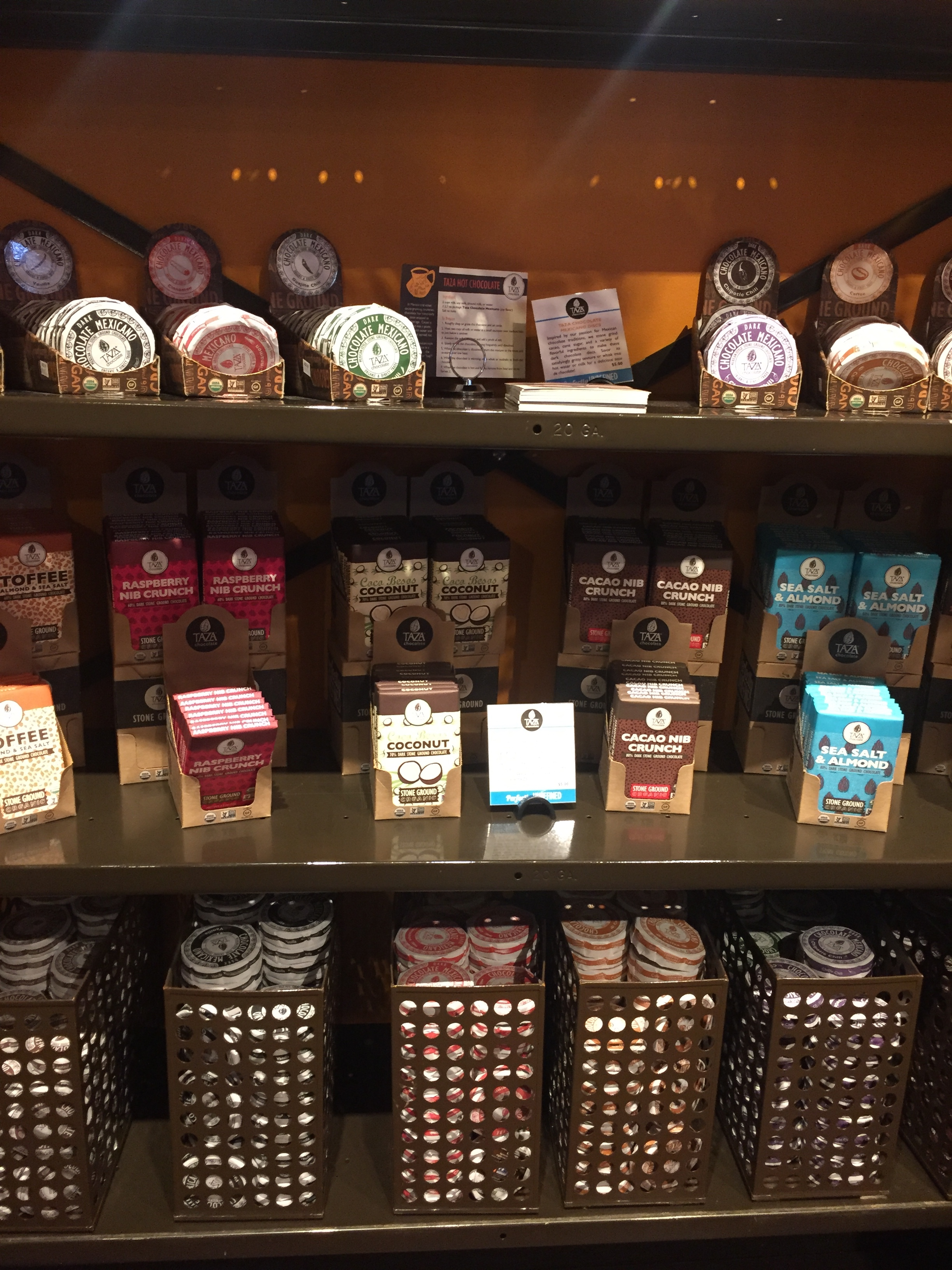
- A shelf full of Taza Chocolates
- Type: Private
- Industry: Food and Confectionery Manufacturers
- Founded: 2005
- Founders: Alex Whitmore, Kathleen Fulton, and Larry Slotnick
- Headquarters: Somerville, Massachusetts, US
- Products: Stone Ground Origin Bars, Amaze Bars, Chocolate Mexicano Discs, Chocolate Covered Treats, Tazitos Minibars, Baking Products
- Website: www.tazachocolate.com

Taza Chocolate is a Mexican-inspired stoneground, organic chocolate manufacturer based in Somerville, Massachusetts, United States. The factory was founded by Alex Whitmore in 2005 and is home to over 40 different products that can be found in 2,800 retail stores across the country.

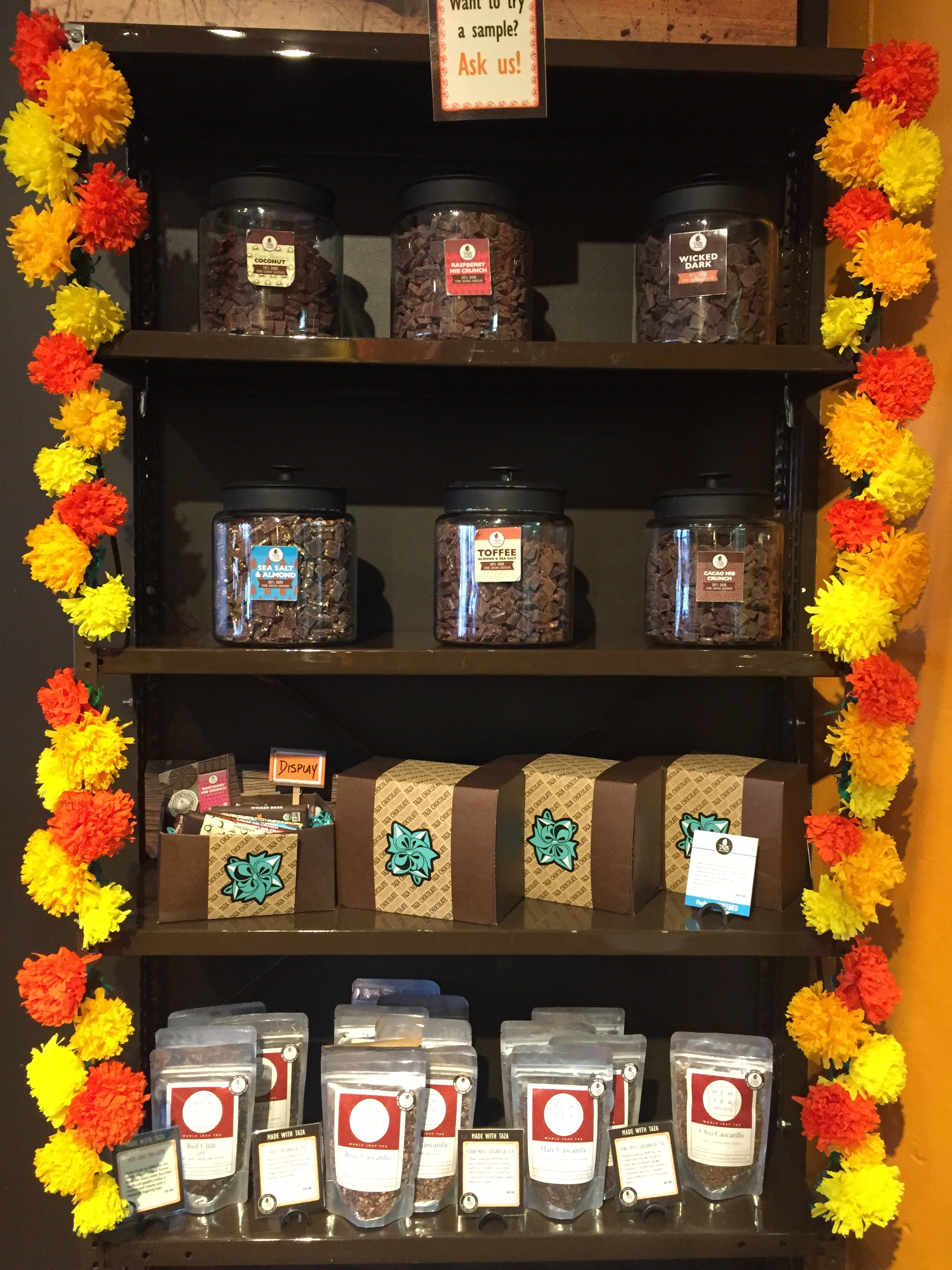
Samples at Taza Chocolate Factory

== History ==
Alex Whitmore founded Taza Chocolate in 2005 after a trip to Oaxaca, Mexico, where he first encountered stone ground chocolate.

After building out a factory space in Somerville, Massachusetts, in 2006, Whitmore acquired a mix of traditional and vintage machinery, including stone mills from Oaxaca, an Italian winnower from Dominican Republic, and a Barth Sirocco roaster from Italy. The cacao beans were initially bought from brokers, but Whitmore later traveled through Central and South America and the Caribbean in search of farmers who could work directly with him. Whitmore and his co-founder and wife, Kathleen Fulton, have maintained a Direct Trade relationship with every cacao grower from where they source the cacao beans.

Taza Chocolate is sold across the United States and in certain countries abroad.

== Direct trade process ==
Taza Chocolate uses Certified USDA organic, non-GMO cacao. The company has developed Direct Trade relationships with small certified organic cacao growers. These trade relationships are between the company and the grower without intermediaries. Taza Chocolate pays them more than the Fair Trade minimum price for cacao.

== Products ==
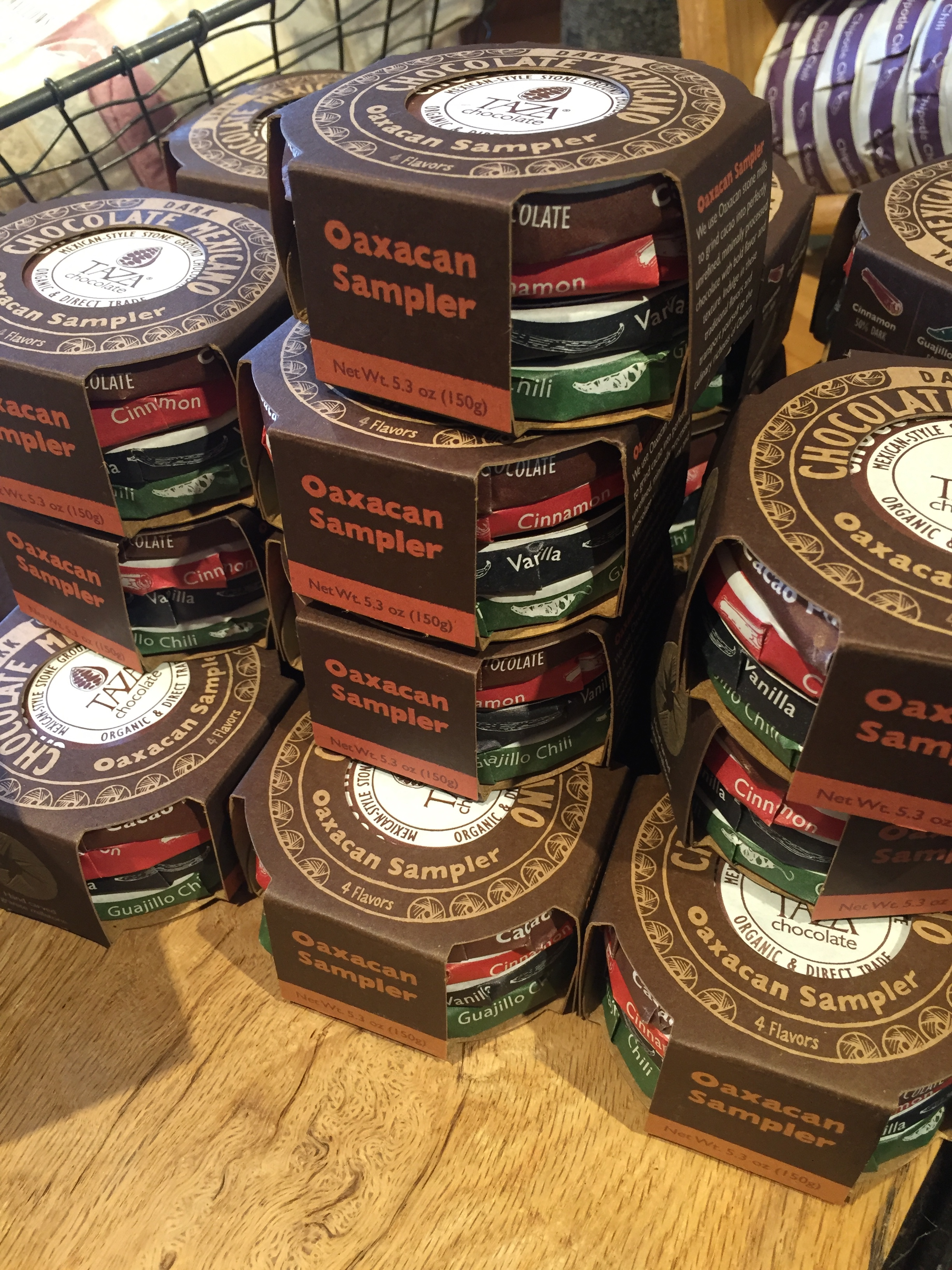
Taza Chocolate Oaxacan Sampler Discs

Taza sells a variety of chocolates in bars and discs, including:

The Amaze Bars: Stone ground chocolate combined with other flavors

- Wicked Dark
- Cacao Crunch
- Deliciously Dark
- Raspberry Crunch
- Sea Salt Almond
- Toffee, Almond & Sea Salt
- Seriously Dark
- Wicked Dark w/ Coconut
- Wicked Dark w/ Ginger
- Wicked Dark w/ Almonds

Chocolate Covered Treats: Almonds, cashews, and hazelnuts covered in stone ground dark chocolate

Chocolate Mexicano Discs: Rustic, organic dark Mexican style chocolate discs

- Cacao Puro
- 85% Super Dark
- Orange
- Cinnamon
- Coffee
- Guajillo Chili
- Salted Almond
- Vanilla

== See also ==
- List of chocolate drink
