= Milkybar =

Nestlé white chocolate bar

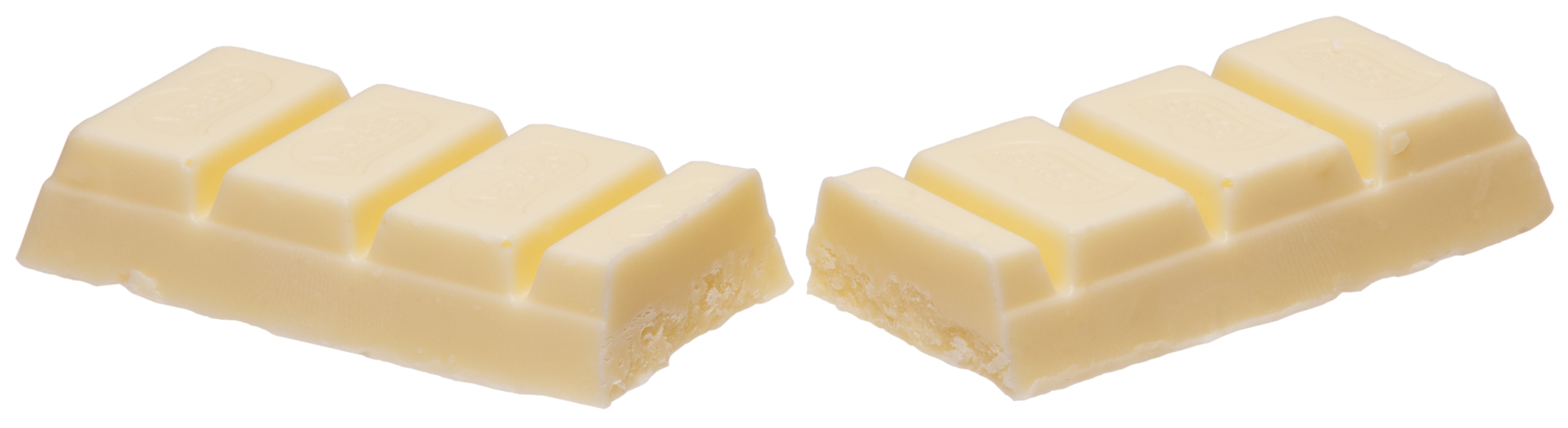
- Product type: Chocolate
- Current owner: Nestlé
- Country: Switzerland
- Introduced: 1936; 90 years ago
- Markets: Worldwide
- Website: milkybar.co.uk

Milkybar, also called Galak in most of continental Europe and Latin America, is a white chocolate confection produced by Nestlé since 1936 and sold worldwide (not sold in the US, although it may be ordered online for delivery, or found in specialty candy shops). According to Nestlé, Milkybar/Galak contains no artificial colours, flavours or preservatives.

== History ==
The Galak brand was launched by Nestlé (at the time Nestlé-Peter-Cailler-Kohler) amidst strong competition within the Swiss chocolate market. It was the first white chocolate brand.

== Advertising ==
=== Milkybar Kid ===
The Milkybar Kid, appearing in a live-action TV advertisement (left), and on a Milkybar wrapper (right)

Since 1961, the Milkybar Kid has been used in television advertising promoting Nestlé Milkybar. The Milkybar Kid is a blond, spectacle-wearing young child, usually dressed as a cowboy, whose catchphrase is "The Milkybars are on me!". The advertisements usually take place in a Wild West setting, and both live-action and animated ads have been produced. Until 8-year-old Hinetaapora Short of New Zealand was selected in 2010, the character had always been male. The character was created by a team led by advertising chief Mike Reynolds.

In the UK, Australia and New Zealand the advertisements were originally accompanied by a jingle extolling "the goodness that's in Milky Bar". In more recent revivals of the campaign, the jingle has been revised to refer to "the good taste that's in Milkybar".

=== Galak ===
Galak was promoted using the 1971 French animated series Oum le Dauphin Blanc ("Zoom the White Dolphin"), with its characters appearing on packaging and in commercials. In commercials, two children, Yann and Marina, and the white dolphin Oum typically overcome villains such as pirates or sharks. Nestlé terminated their use of this licence in 2003, though the likeness of Oum remained on some stocks sold in 2004, which led the series' owners to sue for royalties.

== Variations ==
Milkybar Wowsomes, a chocolate with 30% less sugar than other Nestlé chocolates, was released in 2018. The sugar content was reduced by processing sugar to be aerated and porous. According to Nestlé, as this would dissolve faster in the mouth, it would be perceived as sweet as regular Milkybar chocolate. They were released to meet consumer demand for healthier products. Wowsomes were discontinued in mid-2019 after achieving low sales. A Nestlé representative said this was as the chocolates were not as creamy as traditional Milkybar chocolate.

Milkybar Mix Ups were launched in 2019, an assortment of white chocolate buttons with a cocoa filling, and milk chocolate buttons with a cream filling. They were made using a similar production technique to Rolo chocolates, on the same production line.

=== Regional ===
In Australia and New Zealand, Milkybar does not contain any cocoa mass or cocoa butter, and is therefore not labelled as chocolate.

Milkybar is particularly popular in South Africa. The local version of Milkybar is a white chocolate-like confection made with milk powder, sugar, and vegetable fats (palm, shea nut, and illipe seed), produced by Nestlé South Africa. While listed as "white chocolate" on Nestle's website and by some retailers, Milkybar in South Africa does not contain cocoa butter, a defining ingredient in true white chocolate.
