= Carla Martin (anthropologist) =

American anthropologist

Carla Martin is an American anthropologist. Martin is a lecturer in African and African American studies at Harvard University. Martin's main area of study is chocolate and cocoa production.

Martin was born in Weymouth, Massachusetts and earned bachelor's and master's degrees at Harvard. After college, Martin taught English in Cape Verda for three years, there, she learnt about how the Portuguese government there had conscripted Cape Verdeans into indentured labor on cacao and sugar plantations until the 1960s. It was from this experience that Martin has said she gained her interest in chocolate production. In 2012, Martin completed her doctorate in African and African American Studies at Harvard. The following year, she taught the class "Chocolate Culture and the Politics of Food" at Harvard for the first time. In 2015, Martin founded the nonprofit Institute for Cacao and Chocolate Research (ICCR). The ICCR researches and disseminates information about flavor cocoa to consumers and cacao farmers and laborers and aims to make the chocolate supply chain more equitable. As of 2020, the ICCR had run the New England Chocolate Festival for three years.

As of 2024, Martin still teaches the class Chocolate Culture. The class covers chocolate tasting, the history of chocolate and other food commodities and how they relate to current cocoa production and race. The class has received some attention from white supremacists. Martin's work through Harvard and the ICCR uses chocolate as an opening for discussions around labor, human rights and politics.

== Sources ==
- Carr, Teresa (February 13, 2020). "The Bitter Side of Cocoa Production". Sapiens.
- Dugan, Owen (July 31, 2019). "Conscientious Consumption". Wine Spectator. Vol. 44, no. 5.
- Friel, Lauren (March 20, 2018). "This Harvard chocolate scholar wants you to eat better chocolate". Boston.com.
- Gibson, Lydialyle (April 11, 2024). "The Dark History Behind Chocolate". Harvard Magazine.
- "#StayHomeWithChocolate Festival launched to inspire consumers, support businesses" (Press release). PR Newswire. March 24, 2020. Archived from the original on June 1, 2025.
