= Direct trade =

Form of procurement in which upstream workers receive wages close to end sale prices

Direct trade is a form of sourcing practiced by certain coffee roasters, chocolate makers, tea sellers, gemologists and more who build direct relationships with the farmers, artisanal miners and processors who sell their products. There is no single set of direct trade standards, and specific trade practices vary as a reflection of business and ethical priorities of the roaster or maker. Generally speaking, however, direct trade practitioners view their model as one of mutually-beneficial and transparent trade relationships.

== Contrast with fair trade ==
Some advocates explicitly define direct trade as an alternative to fairtrade certification, and they seek to address the perceived limitations of fair trade by:

- Paying higher premiums directly to farmers and artisanal miners than those mandated by fair trade;
- Tying these premiums to specific quality standards that create a sustainable economic rationale for higher prices;
- Allowing participation by individual farmers, miners and processors, regardless of size or membership in a cooperative;
- Providing microloans and other financial support for equipment, tools and education;
- Eliminating the fees involved in being a certified fair trade company (e.g. fees, dues, and surcharges);
- Generating additional supply chain trust, safety and transparency through personal relationships, price negotiation, training and information sharing.

While such practices are common among self-identified direct trade coffee roasters and chocolate makers, there is no single definition of direct trade nor set of common standards. A lack of third-party accountability is a frequent criticism leveled by direct trade critics, which include former proponents frustrated by what they perceive as a trend of large, marketing-savvy roasters "who bombard consumers with the term despite not offering any clear definition of its meaning, any evidence of an actual direct trade scheme or the slightest shred of transparency regarding sourcing."

Fair trade practices – such as those certified by Fairtrade International – are designed to promote ethical trading standards to the benefit of the poorest of producers in developing countries, providing opportunities for assistance with infrastructural growth, access to credit and micro financing to the farmers and miners, and ensure ethical labor regulations for certified farms and mines. Many studies have found, for example, that fair trade has brought stabilization to the world coffee market, as well as improved many coffee producing farms world wide.

However, the efficacy of fair trade practices have become under a wide range of criticism ranging from less than advertised, to beneficial to large plantations but detrimental to the smallest of farms, unethical disbursement of profits, and even claims of a corrupt tool for marketing and profit causing death and destruction to producers. A study from 2011 demonstrated that fair trade strategies have a greater impact on the overall infrastructure development of growing coffee farms, and direct trades models show to have a greater impact on increased wages, and an overall improved quality of life, reported by the farmers included in the study.

== Examples ==
Original direct traders including coffee roasters Intelligentsia Coffee & Tea, Stumptown Coffee Roasters, and Counter Culture Coffee, and chocolate makers Taza Chocolate and Askinosie Chocolate, have sought to counter perceived misrepresentations of direct trade through increased transparency Counter Culture Coffee and Taza Chocolate pioneered annual Transparency Reports for the specialty coffee and craft chocolate industries, respectively, and each have their direct trade practices audited annually by an independent third-party. Whether these and other efforts to ensure the integrity of direct trade will succeed is the subject of ongoing debate. A company in the UK that implements Direct Trade coffee under their banner of Farm Direct is Ethical Addictions.
