= Mustacciuoli =

Pastry from Naples, Italy

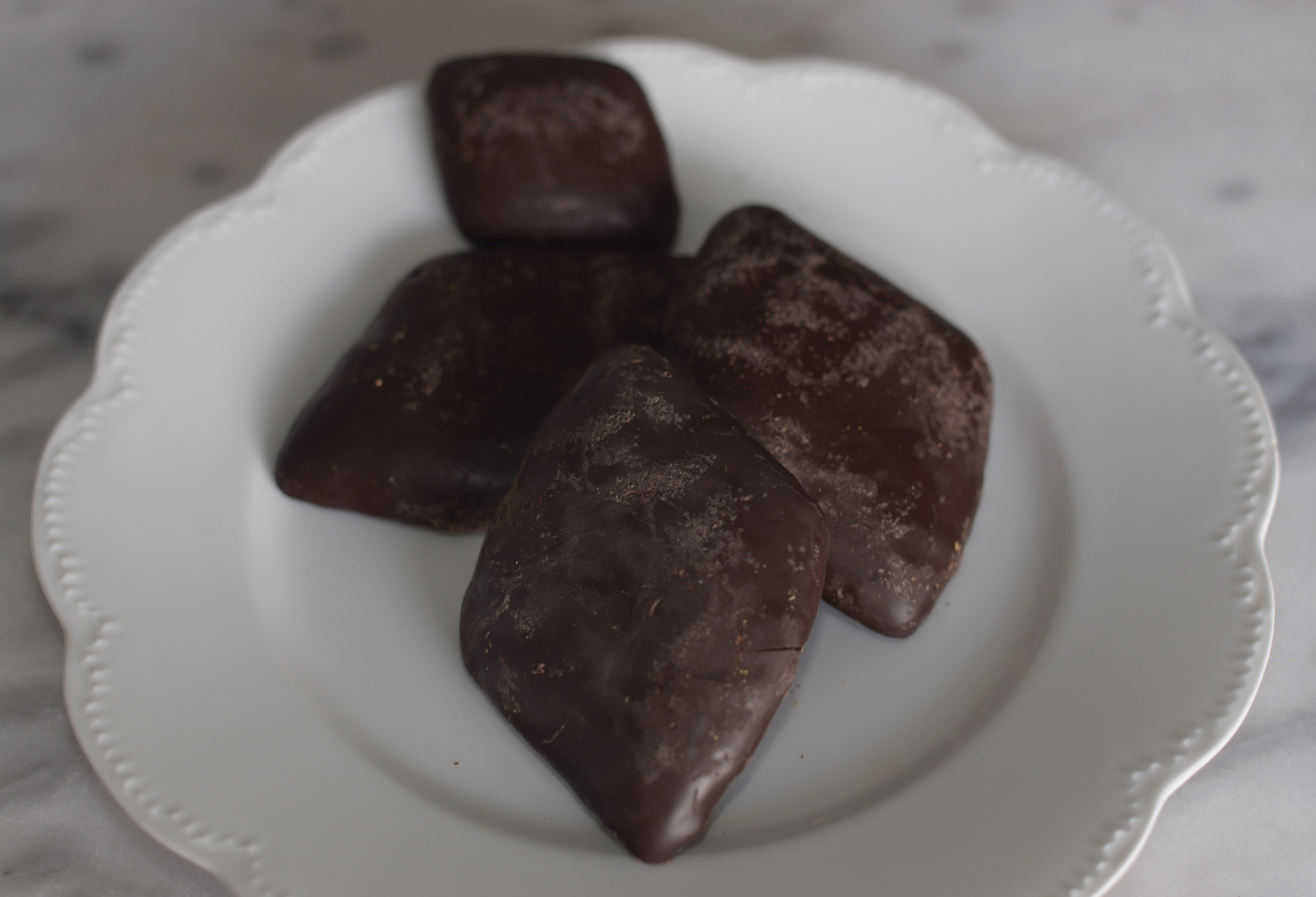
- Alternative names: Mustaccioli, mostaccioli
- Place of origin: Italy
- Region or state: Naples; Apulia; Molise; Abruzzo
- Main ingredients: Flour, almonds, chocolate, sugar, cloves, coffee, olive oil

Mustacciuoli, also known as mustaccioli or mostaccioli, is a pastry originating in the Naples region of Italy, usually served at Christmas time.

== Description ==
Mustaccioli takes the form of a parallelogram, and consists of a soft, spiced, cake-like interior, covered in chocolate. In recent years, there are many variations of mostaccioli sold in Naples, where the chocolate glaze may be replaced by a white chocolate frosting or icing sugar and candied fruit. Mustaccioli are often sold alongside other Neapolitan sweets including roccocò, raffiuoli, susamielli, and struffoli at Christmas time.

== History ==
Neapolitan mostaccioli were mentioned by Bartolomeo Scappi, personal cook of Pope Pius V as part of his pranzo alli XVIII di ottobre (October 18 lunch).

== Etymology ==
The term mustacciuoli derives from the Latin mustaceus and is prey to various folk etymologies. Some say it derives from the Latin mustum, linked to the use of must in some ancient recipes as a sweetener., others from mustax, which is a type of laurel. Originally, the mustaceum was a wedding cake, wrapped in bay leaves that gave aroma during cooking. Hence the proverb loreolam in mustace quaerere, that is: to look uselessly in the focaccia for burnt bay leaves. Another origin could derive from the ancient Greek μάσταξ (mástax) which means morsels, similar to μαστάζω (mastázō) which means to chew or eat.

== Related sweets in other regions ==
- 'Nzuddha: version in Calabria
- Mustazzoli: version in Salento

== See also ==
Media related to Mustacciuoli at Wikimedia Commons

- Neapolitan cuisine
- List of Italian desserts and pastries
