= Mintel =

UK-based global market research firm

Mintel Group Ltd
- Type: Privately held company
- Industry: Market Intelligence
- Founded: 1972; 54 years ago
- Founder: Nicholas Berry
- Headquarters: London, United Kingdom
- Areas served: Global
- Key people: Matthew Nelson (Global CEO); Peter Haigh (Executive Chairman)
- Website: www.mintel.com

Mintel Group Ltd is a global, privately owned market intelligence and consulting firm based in London, UK. The company provides research, data, analysis, forecasts, and advisory services to help clients understand consumers, innovation, and global markets, enabling clearer decision-making and long-term growth. Its offerings are accessible through subscription databases, custom consulting projects, standalone reports, and academic partnerships.

The company operates offices in Auckland, Bangkok, Belfast, Chicago, Düsseldorf, Kuala Lumpur, London, Mumbai, São Paulo, Seoul, Shanghai, Singapore, Sydney, and Tokyo.

== History ==
Mintel was founded in 1972 in London, and the first market intelligence report was published. The first edition of Mintel’s flagship consumer market report, British Lifestyles, was launched in 1984.

In 1997, Mintel became the first market research supplier to provide access to its market research online. The company launched the Global New Products Database (GNPD) in the United States in 1998, tracking product launches in the consumer-packaged goods sector.

Mintel expanded its international market research coverage in 2001 with the launch of European and U.S. market research reports.

In 2007, Mintel partnered with Information Resources, Inc. to launch Mintel GNPD IRIS, a product tracking and sales analysis platform.

== Products and services ==
In 1996, Mintel Global New Products Database (GNPD) launched.

In 2003, Comperemedia started tracking direct mail and print advertising sent to United States and Canada.

Menu Insights was launched in 2004.

In 2006, Mintel Comperemedia launched an email panel and began tracking the trends and straggles in email marketing.

Launch of Mintel GNPD IRIS in 2006.

Mintel Trends was launched in 2007, pairing market research with editorial on major market trends and future developments.

Mintel Inspire was launched in 2007, pairing market research with editorial on major market trends and future developments.

In 2008, Mintel Oxygen and Mintel Beauty Innovation were launched.

Mintel Global Market Navigator launched in 2009.

Mintel Food and Drink launched in 2010.

Mintel Beauty and Personal Care launched in 2011.

In 2011, Mintel Consulting launches.

Mintel Household and Personal Care research launches in 2012.

Mintel Futures launches in 2013.

Mintel Comperemedia ePerformance launched in 2015.

Mintel Purchase Intelligence launched in 2016.

In 2019, Mintel launched Interactive Databooks.

Comperemedia Omni launched in 2018.

In 2020, Mintel Global Consumer research was launched.

Mintel Data Integration launched in 2022.

In 2023, Mintel Leap was launched.

Mintel Spark was launched in 2024 as a product concept generator.

== Acquisitions and Partnerships ==
New Product News Magazine was acquired in 1998.

American Mailbox Monitor was acquired in 1999, rebranded and launched as Mintel Comperemedia in the same year.

In 2005, Paris-based Cosmetic Research was acquired.

The market intelligence firm Access Asia was acquired in October 2011.

The Mintel and Early Data partnership began in 2018.

In 2019, Mintel partnered with Cipher and Pathmatics.

Mintel partnered with Snoop in 2024.

In 2025, Mintel acquired Black Swan Data, London-based AI and social data analytics company.

In 2026, Mintel partnered with predictive attention analytics solution Dragonfly AI.
