= Medical Anthropology (journal) =

- Discipline: Medical anthropology
- Language: English
- Edited by: James Staples, Rebecca Marsland

Publication details
- History: 1977-present
- Publisher: Taylor & Francis
- Frequency: Bimonthly
- Impact factor: 1.848 (2018)

Standard abbreviations
- ISO 4: Med. Anthropol.

Indexing
- CODEN: MDANES
- ISSN: 0145-9740 (print); 1545-5882 (web)
- LCCN: 78643782
- OCLC no.: 884651771

Links
- Journal homepage; Online access; Online archive

Medical Anthropology is a bimonthly peer-reviewed academic journal covering medical anthropology published by Routledge. It was established in 1977. The editors-in-chief are James Staples and Rebecca Marsland (Brunel University of London and the University of Edinburgh).

== Abstracting and indexing ==
The journal is abstracted and indexed in Anthropological Index Online, Current Contents/Social & Behavioral Sciences, EBSCOhost, European Reference Index for the Humanities, International Bibliography of the Social Sciences, Social Sciences Citation Index, PsycINFO, and Scopus.
