= Guittard Chocolate Company =

American chocolate company

Coordinates: 37.597452°N 122.379557°W

- Company type: Corporation (family-held)
- Founded: 1868
- Founder: Étienne Guittard
- Headquarters: Burlingame, California, United States
- Key people: Gary Guittard (President and CEO)
- Products: Confectionery; Couverture chocolate
- Owner: Gary Guittard
- Number of employees: 240
- Website: guittard.com

Guittard Chocolate Company is an American-based chocolate maker which produces couverture chocolate, using original formulas and traditional French methods. The company was founded in 1868 and is headquartered in Burlingame, California. It is the oldest continuously family-owned chocolate company in the United States, having been family-owned for more than four generations.

== History ==
Guittard Chocolate was founded by Etienne "Eddy" Guittard (1838–1899), who immigrated to the United States from Tournus, France, in the 1850s during the California Gold Rush. He brought French chocolates with him, which he traded for supplies. After trying without success for three years to strike gold in the Sierra, he returned to San Francisco, where shopkeepers with whom he had earlier traded his chocolate convinced him to become a chocolate maker. He then returned to Paris and saved money to buy the equipment he needed before returning to San Francisco and opening his business at 405 Sansome Street on the San Francisco waterfront. Initially, he also sold items such as tea, coffee, and spices alongside his chocolate.

Horace C. Guittard, Étienne's son, was in charge when the 1906 San Francisco earthquake destroyed the city. In the aftermath of the quake, a new plant was built on Commercial Street. The company expanded in 1921 and 1936 onto property on Main Street south of Market.

In 1954, Guittard sold its property to the city so that Embarcadero Freeway could be built. The company relocated to a 75,000-square-foot (7,000 m^{2}) facility at the corner of Guittard and Rollins road in Burlingame, California, where it is still located today.

Gary Guittard began working full-time at the company in 1975. He replaced Horace A. Guittard (his father) in 1989, becoming president and CEO.

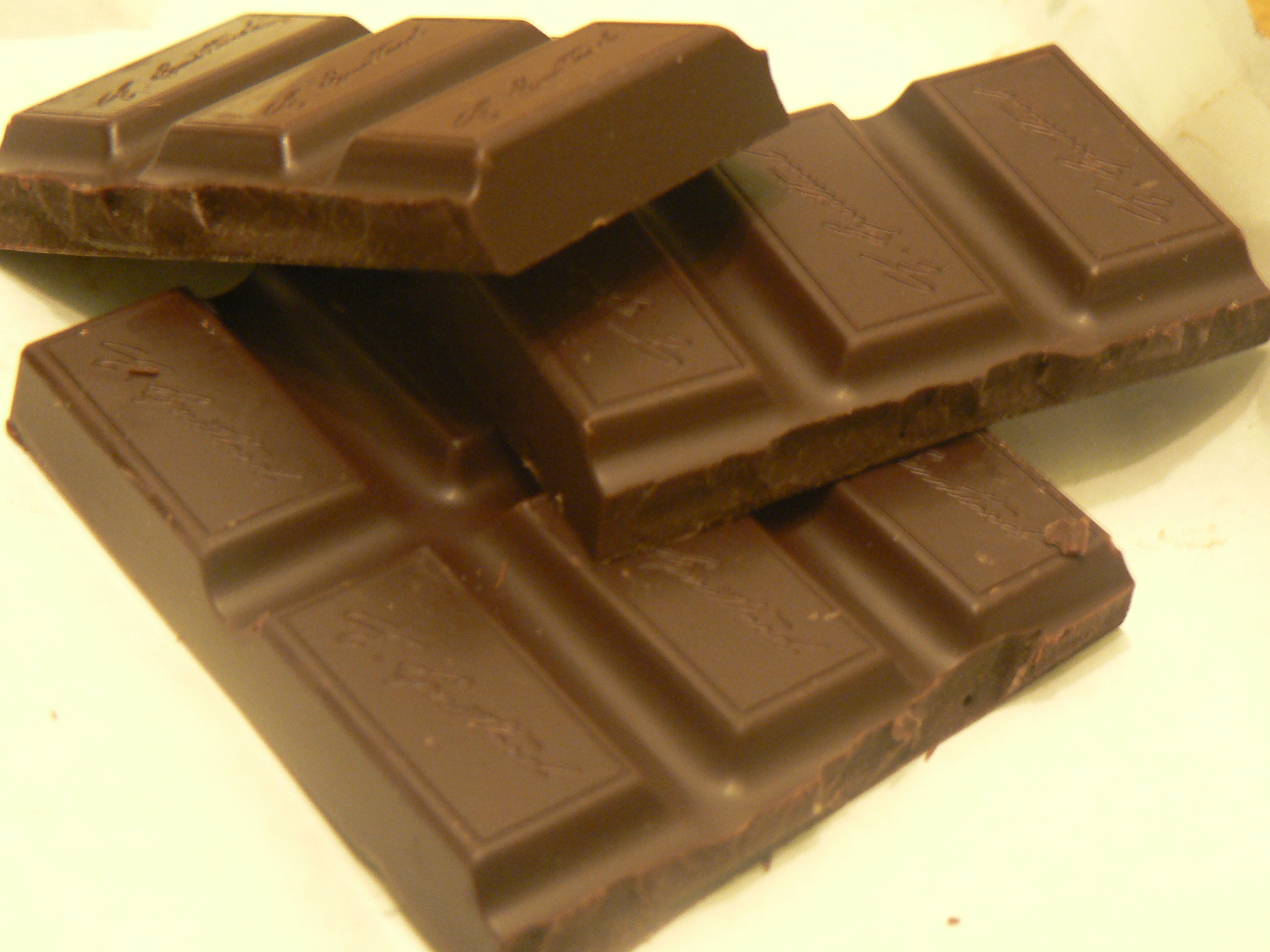
Pieces of Guittard bittersweet chocolate

== Products ==
The company produces cocoa, chocolate syrup, milk chocolate balls and eggs, and baking chips, as well as mints and mint wafers. Eighty-five percent of Guittard's clients are food-industry professionals, while 15% are pastry chefs. Customers include See's Candies, Rocky Mountain Chocolate, Kellogg's, Baskin-Robbins, Recchiuti Confections, Garrison Confections, Williams Sonoma, Nation's Giant Hamburgers, and Blue Chip Cookies. The company also sells to chef Donald Wressel and has recently developed a variety of chocolate bars specifically designed for amateur bakers.

== See also ==
- Ghirardelli Chocolate Company
