= Sapiens (magazine) =

American anthropology magazine

- Categories: Online magazine - Science
- Publisher: Wenner-Gren Foundation for Anthropological Research
- Founded: 2016
- Final issue: 2025
- Country: United States
- Language: English
- Website: sapiens.org

Sapiens is a digital magazine about the human world established in 2016. The magazine focuses on anthropology including aspects such as archaeology, culture, biology, and language. The magazine also has a heavy emphasis on decolonization, diversity, ethics, and equity in order to "help address the inequalities, injustices, and harms humans perpetrate against one another and our planet" and build a "a more just and sustainable world;" it called this emphasis "Radical Humanism."

The magazine is funded by the Wenner-Gren Foundation for Anthropological Research, and is published in collaboration with the University of Chicago Press.

The magazine has a podcast produced by House of Pod that focuses on conversations with anthropologist from around the world.

== Awards ==
In 2017, Sapiens magazine received the American Anthropological Association General Anthropology Division New Directions Award for "providing quality scholarship in sophisticated yet accessible formats".

In 2018, Chip Colwell, editor-in-chief of Sapiens Magazine, received the American Anthropological Association Executive Director's Award for Innovative Directions to the field for his "creative, resourceful, and risk-taking work".

In 2017, Elizabeth Svoboda, writing for Sapiens magazine, was the winner of the 2017 Gene S. Stuart award for archaeological journalism of the Society for American Archaeology. Her article “The Darkest Truths” represents an "informative and thoughtful look into Holocaust archaeology with its attending ethical dimensions and responsibilities".

Megan I. Gannon, writing for Sapiens magazine, was awarded the 2021 Society for American Archaeology Gene S. Stuart award in recognition of efforts to enhance public understanding of archaeology. Her article “Unearthing the True Toll of the Tulsa Race Massacre” was considered a "timely and compelling piece about a little-remembered but horrific episode of racial violence".
