= David Lebovitz =

Author

David Lebovitz (born 1958) is an American author primarily known for writing about food. He worked as a dessert and pastry chef before starting to write cookbooks. He also wrote a memoir about his experiences buying and renovating an apartment in Paris.

In 1999, two years after Jim Leff and Bob Okumura founded Chowhound, the online discussion forum in 1997, Lebovitz launched his eponymous baking and desserts website. Thus, he is considered one of the earliest, if not, the original "food blogger". Lesley Chesterman wrote in NUVO in 2022: "Having launched his website in 1999, before food blogs really even existed, you could argue that Lebovitz all but created the genre."

In addition to his food blog, Lebovitz also publishes an online newsletter. The recipes in his books and on his blog are often reprinted (with permission) or adapted in food columns, and he has been interviewed for articles in mainstream digital and legacy media.

== Pre-Paris culinary career ==
Lebovitz, who was born in 1958 and grew up in Connecticut, started working in restaurant kitchens while a teenager, including in upstate New York, USA. In the early 1980s, Lebovitz moved to San Francisco, California, where he worked as a line-cook, and then a pastry chef at the Berkeley restaurant, Chez Panisse, known for being an early advocate of farm-to-table cuisine. Lebovitz worked at Chez Panisse for thirteen years before launching his website and writing his first cook book. He moved to Paris, France in 2004.

== Food blogging in Paris ==
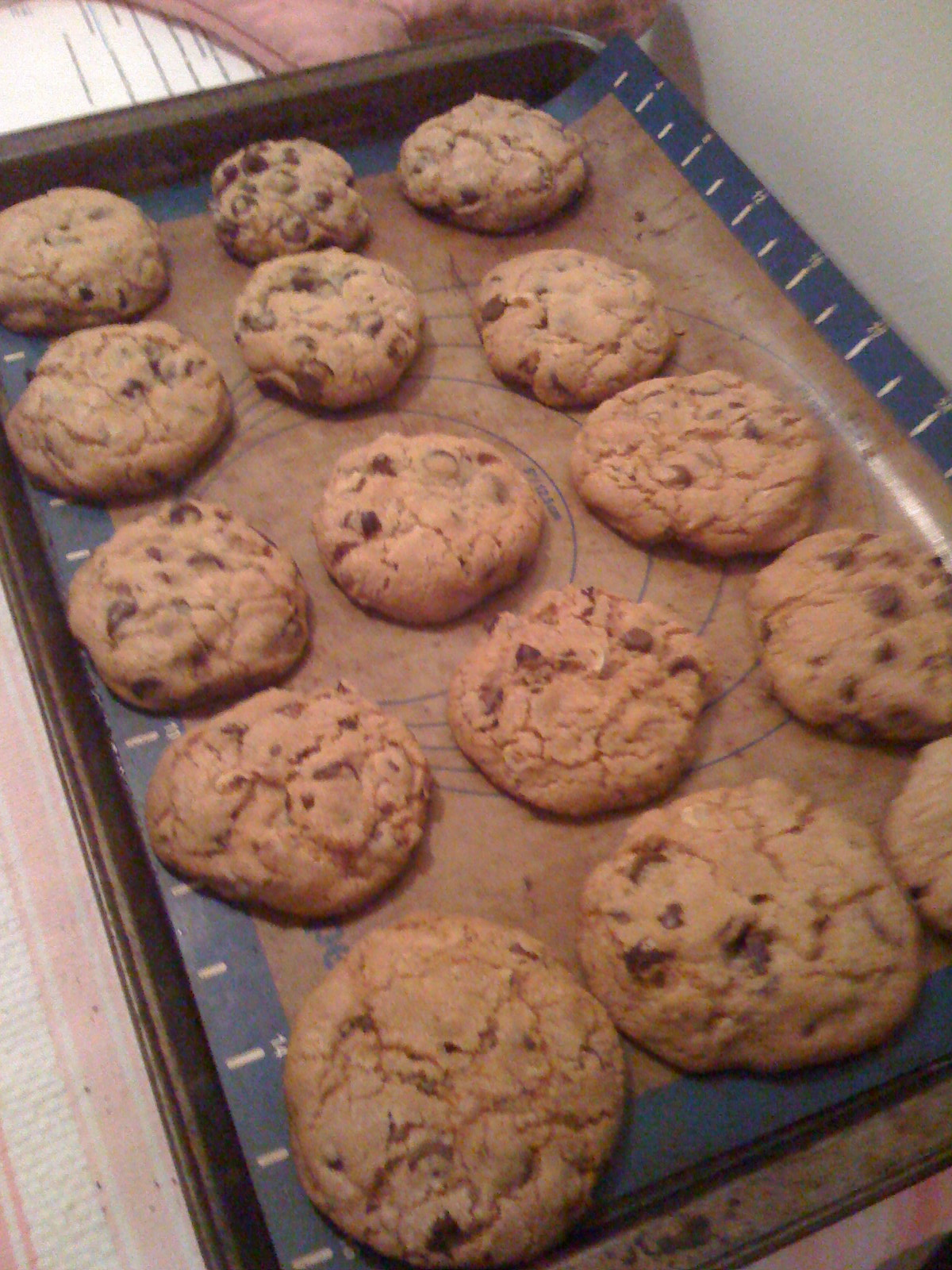
Hazelnut Chocolate Chip Cookies from the Great Book of Chocolate

Since relocating to Paris, Lebovitz' has continued to blog about food. He has published eight cookbooks, and written guest columns for the Los Angeles Times and the Financial Times. In 2017, Lebovitz published a memoir recounting his experiences with the Parisian real estate market.

Lebovitz' impact and influence on food blogs and blogging was discussed by Jennifer Lofgren in a 2013 journal article about how food blogs had evolved over the preceding twenty-five years.

== Books ==
- Lebovitz, D. (2020). Drinking French: The Iconic Cocktails, Apéritifs, and Café Traditions of France, with 160 Recipes. United States: Clarkson Potter/Ten Speed. ISBN 978-1-60774-929-5
- Lebovitz, D. (2018). The Perfect Scoop, Revised and Updated: 200 Recipes for Ice Creams, Sorbets, Gelatos, Granitas, and Sweet Accompaniments. United States: Clarkson Potter/Ten Speed. ISBN 978-0-399-58031-4
- Lebovitz, D. (2017). L'appart: The Delights and Disasters of Making My Paris Home. United States: Crown. ISBN 978-0-8041-8838-8
- Lebovitz, D. (2014). My Paris Kitchen: Recipes and Stories. United States: Clarkson Potter/Ten Speed. ISBN 978-1-60774-267-8
- Lebovitz, D. (2010). Ready for Dessert: My Best Recipes. United States: Ten Speed Press. ISBN 978-1-58008-138-2
- Lebovitz, D. (2009). The Sweet Life in Paris: Delicious Adventures in the World's Most Glorious - and Perplexing - City. United States: Broadway Books. ISBN 978-0-7679-2888-5
- Lebovitz, D. (2007). The Perfect Scoop: Ice Creams, Sorbets, Granitas, and Sweet Accompaniments. United States: Ten Speed Press. ISBN 978-1-58008-219-8
- Lebovitz, D. (2004). The Great Book of Chocolate: The Chocolate Lover's Guide with Recipes. United States: Clarkson Potter/Ten Speed. ISBN 978-1-58008-495-6
- Lebovitz, D. (2003). Ripe for Dessert: 100 Outstanding Desserts with Fruit--Inside, Outside, Alongside. United States: HarperCollins. ISBN 978-0-06-621246-3
- Lebovitz, D. (1999). Room For Dessert: 110 Recipes for Cakes, Custards, Souffles, Tarts, Pies, Cobblers, Sorbets, Sherbets, Ice Creams, Cookies, Candies, and Cordials. United Kingdom: HarperCollins. ISBN 978-0-06-019185-6

== Selected awards ==
- Blog of the Decade. Saveur Blog Awards 2019
- Best Celebrity Food Blog. Saveur Best Food Blog Awards 2012
- Best Culinary Travel Blog. Saveur Best Food Blog Awards 2011
