= National Confectioners Association =

American trade organization

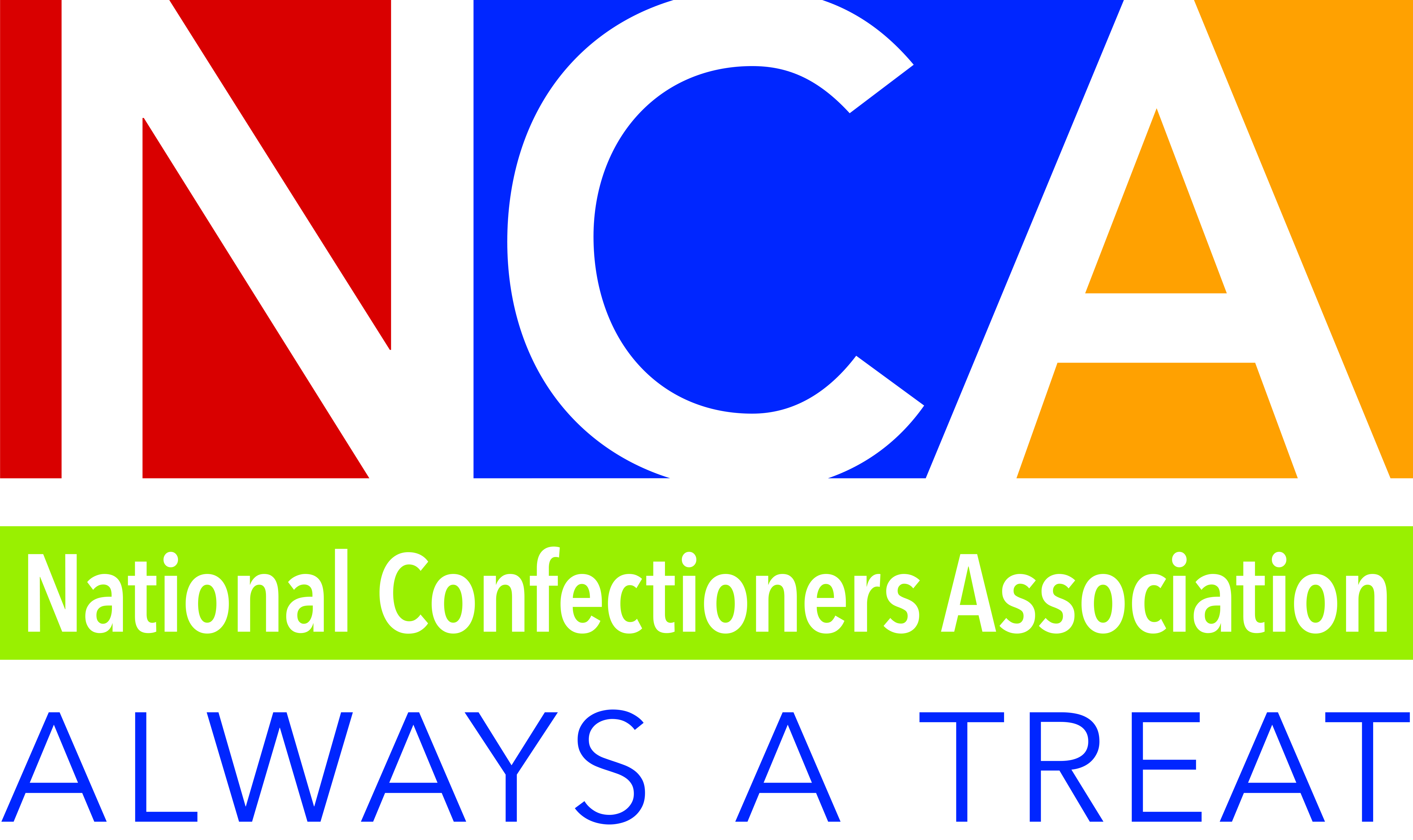
Logo of the National Confectioners Association

The National Confectioners Association is an American trade organization that promotes chocolate, candy, gum and mints, and the companies that make these treats. NCA lobbies the American government in favor of the confectionery industry, evaluated at US$35 billion. Confections are produced in all 50 states. The association "annually hosts the National Candy Show in Chicago, as well as the Candy Hall of Fame". As of 2024, the Sweets and Snacks Expo will take place in Indianapolis.

== Candy Hall of Fame ==
The Candy Hall of Fame is an event produced by the association that recognizes the achievements of leaders across the confectionery industry globally.

=== Class of 2021 ===
- Michelle Frame, Victus Ars
- Pam Gesford, The Hershey Company
- Forrest Mars Jr. (posthumous), Mars Wrigley Confectionery U.S.
- Deb Grenon, My Favorite Company, Inc.
- Barry Phillips, SpartanNash Co.
- Kurt Rosenberg (posthumous), Promotion in Motion Companies
- Alan Scharhon, Halfon Candy Co.
- Mark Schlott, R.M. Palmer Co.
- David Shaffer, Just Born, Inc.
- Douglas Simons, Enstrom Candies, Inc.
- Robert Taylor, Burdette Beckmann Inc.

=== Class of 2017 ===
- Peter Blommer, Blommer Chocolate Co.
- Rick Brindle, Mondelez International, Inc.
- Sara Clair, Brown & Haley
- Ray Cote, American Chocolate Mould Co.
- Basant Dwivedi, The Promotion In Motion Cos., Inc.
- Mary Beth Geraci, Carlin Group
- Richard Hartel, University of Wisconsin-Madison
- Scott Hartman, Rutter’s Holdings Inc.
- Rob Nelson, Elmer Candy Corp.
- Dave Taiclet, 1-800-Flowers.com/Fannie May Confections
- Mary Villa, URM Stores Inc.

== Controversy ==
In March 2007, the Chocolate Manufacturers Association, whose members include Hershey's, Nestlé, and Archer Daniels Midland, began lobbying the U.S. Food and Drug Administration (FDA) to change the legal definition of chocolate to allow the substitution of "safe and suitable vegetable fats and oils" (including partially hydrogenated vegetable oils) for cocoa butter in addition to using "any sweetening agent" (including artificial sweeteners) and milk substitutes. Currently, the FDA does not allow a product to be referred to as "chocolate" if the product contains any of these ingredients. To work around this restriction, products with cocoa substitutes are often branded or labeled as "chocolatey" or "made with chocolate".

On March 7, 2017, The Washington Post reported that the NCA was lobbying the Trump administration. The NCA's goal, as reported by the Post, was to advocate for the rollback of government policies that make the production of NCA members' products more expensive. One of the controversial issues reported by the Post was the scheduling of NCA events at Trump-owned properties. Thus, money is being paid by the NCA to Trump as they seek to influence government policy.
