= Michelle Yoo =

New Zealand food scientist

Academic background
- Thesis: Development and application of an in vitro physicochemical upper gastrointestinal system (IPUGS) simulating the human digestive processes (2009)
- Doctoral advisor: Xiao Dong Chen

Academic work
- Institutions: Auckland University of Technology, Massey University

Michelle Ji Yeon Yoo is a New Zealand academic, and is a full professor at the Auckland University of Technology, specialising in food digestibility and the development of value-added foods.

== Academic career ==
Yoo completed a Bachelor of Technology in Biotechnology with honours at the University of Auckland, and then followed this with a PhD titled Development and application of an in vitro physicochemical upper gastrointestinal system (IPUGS) simulating the human digestive processes at Monash University. Her research was supervised by Xiao Dong Chen. Yoo completed postdoctoral research at Massey University before joining the faculty of the Auckland University of Technology in 2012. She was appointed to associate professor in 2021 and full professor in 2024.

Yoo is an Auckland University of Technology food science programme leader and Deputy Head of Research for the School of Science. She is also an associate investigator in the Riddet Institute, a New Zealand Centre of Research Excellence focusing on 'fundamental and strategic scientific research in food'.

Yoo's research focuses on digestibility of foods, which she examines using the in vitro digestion model developed during her doctoral studies. She investigates how foods such as meat and seafood are broken down during digestion, and how they can be processed to make them more digestible. Yoo is also interested in value-added foods, such as dairy products and gluten-free products with added bioactives, and has worked with AgResearch scientists on dry-ageing of lamb and beef products.

== Selected works ==
- Kylie D Foster; John M V Grigor; Jean Ne Cheong; Michelle J Y Yoo; John E Bronlund; Marco P Morgenstern (2011). "The role of oral processing in dynamic sensory perception". Journal of Food Science. 76 (2): R49-61. doi:10.1111/j.1750-3841.2010.02029.x. PMID 21535784. Wikidata Q37871095.
- Kevin Kantono; Hamid, Nazimah; Shepherd, Daniel; Michelle J Y Yoo; Gianpaolo Grazioli; B Thomas Carr (2016). "Listening to music can influence hedonic and sensory perceptions of gelati". Appetite. 100: 244–255. doi:10.1016/j.appet.2016.02.143. PMID 26923742. Wikidata Q30385007.
- Kevin Kantono; Hamid, Nazimah; Shepherd, Daniel; Michelle J. Y. Yoo; B. Thomas Carr; Gianpaolo Grazioli (2016). "The effect of background music on food pleasantness ratings". Psychology of Music. 44 (5): 1111–1125. doi:10.1177/0305735615613149. Wikidata Q121872251.
- Zhengjie Fu; Michelle J Y Yoo; Weibiao Zhou; Lei Zhang; Yutao Chen; Jun Lu (2017). "Effect of (-)-epigallocatechin gallate (EGCG) extracted from green tea in reducing the formation of acrylamide during the bread baking process". Food Chemistry. 242: 162–168. doi:10.1016/j.foodchem.2017.09.050. PMID 29037673. Wikidata Q47812404.
- Qianli Ma; Hamid, Nazimah; Oey, Indrawati; Kevin Kantono.; Farnaz Faridnia; Michelle Yoo; Mustafa Farouk (2016). "Effect of chilled and freezing pre-treatments prior to pulsed electric field processing on volatile profile and sensory attributes of cooked lamb meats". Innovative Food Science and Emerging Technologies. 37: 359–374. doi:10.1016/j.ifset.2016.04.009. Wikidata Q121872249.
- Tung Diep; Chris Pook; Michelle Yoo (2020). "Phenolic and Anthocyanin Compounds and Antioxidant Activity of Tamarillo (Solanum betaceum Cav.)". Antioxidants. 9 (2): 169. doi:10.3390/antiox9020169. PMC 7070485. PMID 32085645. Wikidata Q89835317.
- Mustafa Farouk; Michelle J Y Yoo; Hamid, Nazimah; Maryann Staincliffe; Davies, Briar Jean; Knowles, Scott (2017). "Novel meat-enriched foods for older consumers". Food Research International. 104: 134–142. doi:10.1016/j.foodres.2017.10.033. PMID 29433778. Wikidata Q50057157.
- 'Michelle' Ji Yeon Yoo; Xiao Dong Chen (2006). "GIT Physicochemical Modeling - A Critical Review". International Journal of Food Engineering. 2 (4). doi:10.2202/1556-3758.1144. Wikidata Q125755237.
