= Jingyuan Wen =

New Zealand professor of pharmacy

Academic background
- Education: Changchun University of Chinese Medicine, Fudan University, University of Otago
- Thesis: Barriers to the intestinal absorption of peptides and proteins in the possum (Trichosurus vulpecula) (2003)
- Doctoral advisor: Ian George Tucker

Jingyuan Wen is a New Zealand pharmacology academic, and is a full professor at the University of Auckland, specialising in drug discovery, formulation and delivery.

== Academic career ==
Wen completed a Doctor of Medicine degree at Changchun University of Chinese Medicine, and a Master of Science degree at Fudan University. She completed her PhD titled Barriers to the intestinal absorption of peptides and proteins in the possum (Trichosurus vulpecula) at the University of Otago, under the supervision of Professor Ian Tucker. After postdoctoral research, Wen then joined the faculty of the University of Auckland, rising to full professor in 2024. Wen is an associate investigator with the Maurice Wilkins Centre for Molecular Biodiscovery, a Centre of Research Excellence. She has been active in the New Zealand chapter of the Controlled Release Society, and has been an invited speaker at the annual meeting of the international society, and Chair of the Oral Drug Delivery Award Committee. She is an editor for the journals Acta Materia Medica, Journal of Pharmaceutics and the Asian Journal of Pharmaceutical Science.

Wen's research focuses on drug discovery, formulation, and delivery systems. Wen has received research funding from the NZ-China Biomedical Research Alliance fund of the Health Research Council-administered MBIE Catalyst Fund, to work with Guo-Liang (Leon) Lu and William Denny on Chinese collaboration to investigate lymphocyte infiltration using nanosystems. She has also worked with Craig Bunt on diabetes treatments.

== Selected works ==
- Roohinejad, Shahin; Greiner, Ralf; Oey, Indrawati; Wen, Jingyuan, eds. (27 April 2018). Emulsion-based Systems for Delivery of Food Active Compounds: Formation, Application, Health and Safety. John Wiley & Sons Inc. ISBN 9781119247142.
- Shuo Chen; Sara M Hanning; James Falconer; Michelle Locke; Wen, J. (2019). "Recent advances in non-ionic surfactant vesicles (niosomes): Fabrication, characterization, pharmaceutical and cosmetic applications". European Journal of Pharmaceutics and Biopharmaceutics. 144: 18–39. doi:10.1016/j.ejpb.2019.08.015. PMID 31446046. Wikidata Q92845934.
- Thi Van Anh Ha; Saehoon Kim; Yeri Choi; Hae-Soo Kwak; Sung Je Lee; Wen, J.; Oey, Indrawati; Sanghoon Ko (2015). "Antioxidant activity and bioaccessibility of size-different nanoemulsions for lycopene-enriched tomato extract". Food Chemistry. 178: 115–121. doi:10.1016/j.foodchem.2015.01.048. PMID 25704691. Wikidata Q47404483.
- Xiaoting Shan; Xiang Gong; Jie Li; Wen, J.; Yaping Li; Zhiwen Zhang (2022). "Current approaches of nanomedicines in the market and various stage of clinical translation". Acta Pharmaceutica Sinica B. 12 (7): 3028–3048. doi:10.1016/j.apsb.2022.02.025. PMC 9293719. PMID 35865096. Wikidata Q127082662.
- Anges Teo; Kelvin Goh; Wen, J.; Oey, Indrawati; Sanghoon Ko; Hae-Soo Kwak; Sung Je Lee (2015). "Physicochemical properties of whey protein, lactoferrin and Tween 20 stabilised nanoemulsions: Effect of temperature, pH and salt". Food Chemistry. 197 (Pt A): 297–306. doi:10.1016/j.foodchem.2015.10.086. PMID 26616953. Wikidata Q86827970.
- Qiong Chen; McGillivray, Duncan; Wen, J.; Fang Zhong; Siew Young Quek (2013). "Co-encapsulation of fish oil with phytosterol esters and limonene by milk proteins". Journal of Food Engineering. 117 (4): 505–512. doi:10.1016/j.jfoodeng.2013.01.011. Wikidata Q123416287.
- Qiong Chen; Fang Zhong; Wen, J.; McGillivray, Duncan; Siew Young Quek (2013). "Properties and Stability of Spray-Dried and Freeze-Dried Microcapsules Co-Encapsulated with Fish Oil, Phytosterol Esters, and Limonene". Drying Technology. 31 (6): 707–716. doi:10.1080/07373937.2012.755541. Wikidata Q123416291.
- Sanjukta Duarah; Manisha Sharma; Wen, J. (2019). "Recent advances in microneedle-based drug delivery: Special emphasis on its use in paediatric population". European Journal of Pharmaceutics and Biopharmaceutics. 136: 48–69. doi:10.1016/j.ejpb.2019.01.005. PMID 30633972. Wikidata Q91003551.
