= Types of chocolate =

Classification of different chocolate types

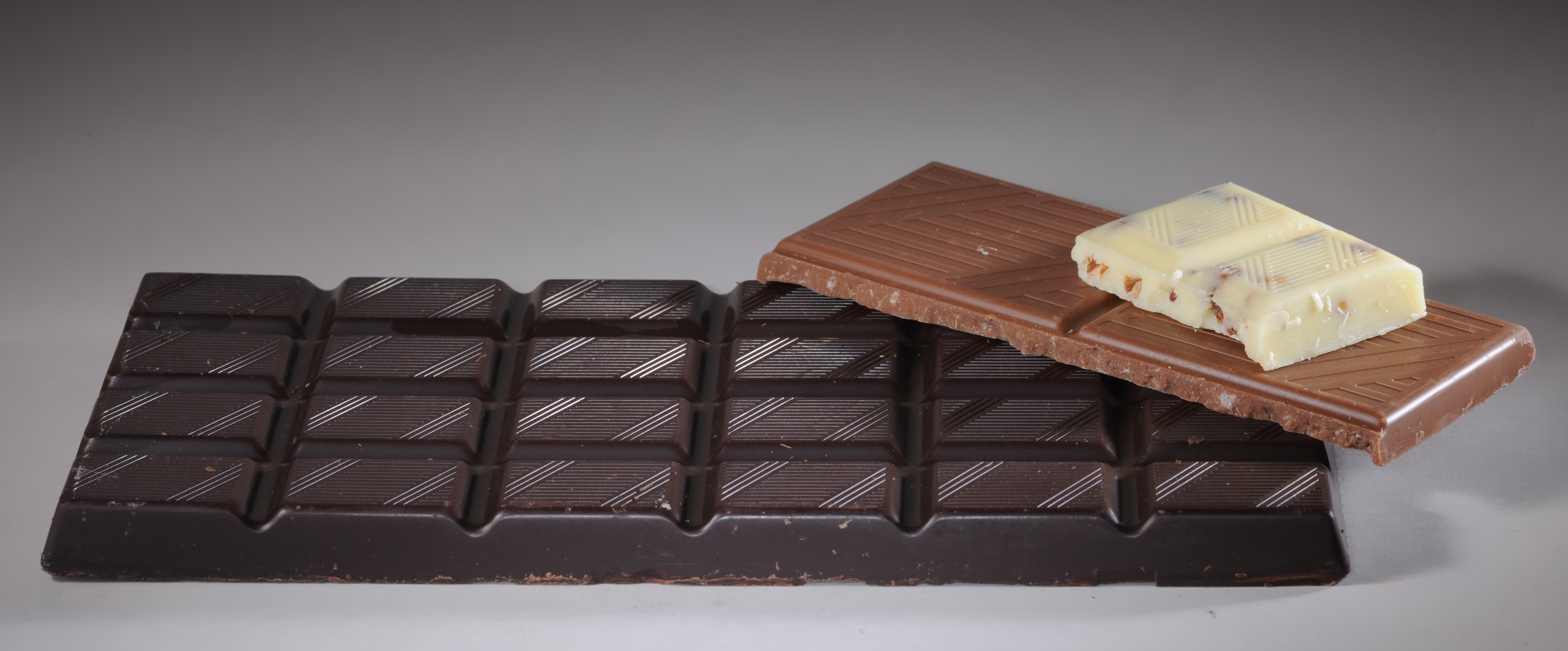
Chocolate most commonly comes in dark, milk and white varieties, with chocolate liquor contributing to the brown coloration.

Chocolate is a food made from roasted and ground cocoa beans mixed with fat (e.g. cocoa butter) and powdered sugar to produce a solid confectionery. There are several types of chocolate, classified primarily according to the proportion of cocoa and fat content used in a particular formulation.

== Eating ==
=== Traditional ===
==== Dark ====
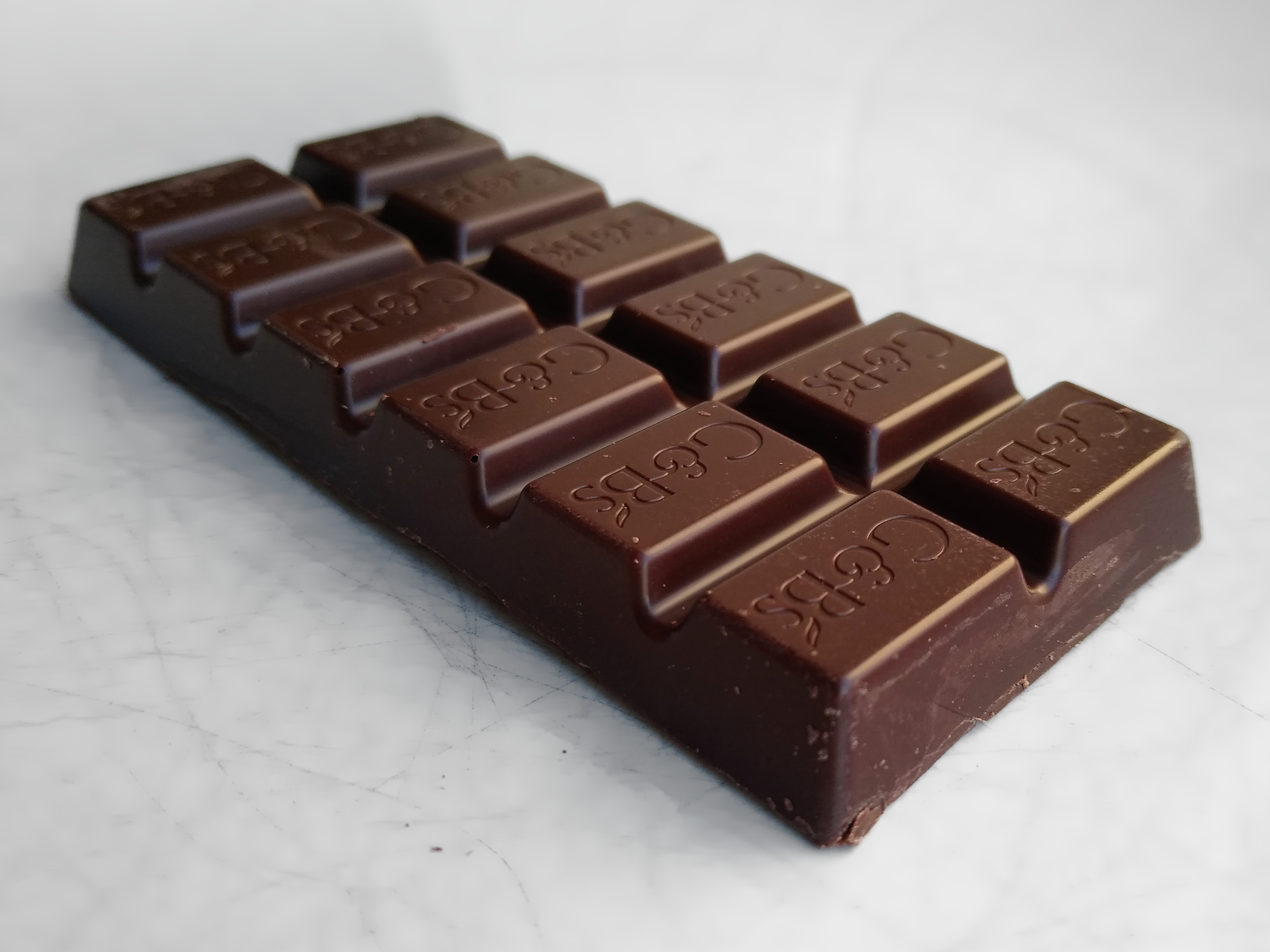
Dark chocolate bar

Dark chocolate, also called plain chocolate, is produced using only cocoa butter, with no milk fat included. It is made from chocolate liquor to which some sugar, more cocoa butter and vanilla are added. Dark chocolate can be eaten as is, or used in cooking, for which thicker baking bars, usually with high cocoa percentages ranging from 70% to 100%, are sold. A higher amount of total cocoa solids usually indicates more bitterness, although it is not always the case. Many brands display the cocoa percentage on their packaging.

"Bittersweet chocolate" is a version of dark chocolate intended for baking with a low amount of sugar, with the sugar typically consisting of about 33% of the final mass. "Semi-sweet chocolate" includes more sugar, resulting in a somewhat sweeter confection, but the two are largely interchangeable in baking.

European Union rules specify a minimum of 35% cocoa solids. The U.S. Food and Drug Administration does not have a standard of identity for dark chocolate, but requires a minimum concentration of chocolate liquor of 15% for sweet chocolate and 35% for semisweet or bittersweet chocolate.

As of 2017, there is no high-quality evidence that dark chocolate affects blood pressure significantly. However, a 2017 review found some moderate‐quality evidence that flavanol‐rich cocoa products may have a small (≈2 mmHg) short term lowering of blood pressure in mainly healthy adults.

==== Milk ====
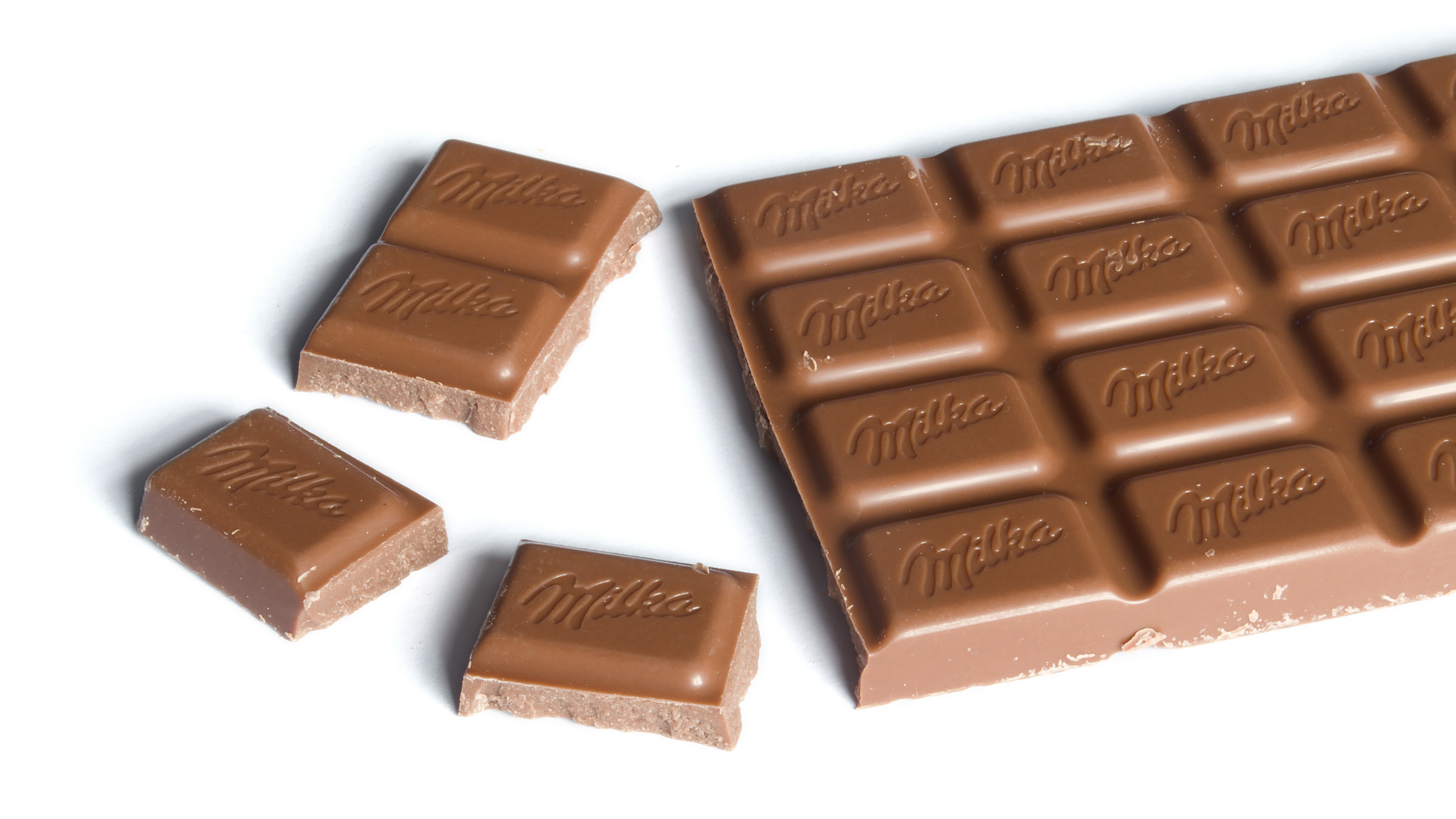
Milk chocolate tablet

Milk chocolate is solid chocolate made with milk. Differences in flavor between different brands and regions are largely due to differences in how the manufacturers handle the milk during production, such as by choosing powdered milk, condensed milk, chocolate crumb, or partially lipolyzed milk.

In 1875 a Swiss confectioner, Daniel Peter, developed a solid milk chocolate using condensed milk, which had been invented by Henri Nestlé, Peter's neighbor in Vevey.

==== White ====
White chocolate is made from cocoa butter, sugar and milk solids. It is ivory in color and lacks the dark appearance of other types of chocolate as it does not contain the non-fat components of cocoa (non-fat cocoa solids). Due to this omission, as well as its sweetness and the occasional use of additives, some consumers challenge whether white chocolate should be considered chocolate.

Of the three traditional types of chocolate, white chocolate is the least popular. It is sold in a variety of forms, including bars, chips and coating nuts. It is common for manufacturers to pair white chocolate with other flavors, such as matcha or berries. The taste and texture of white chocolate are divisive: admirers praise its texture as creamy, while detractors criticize its flavor as cloying and bland. White chocolate has a shorter shelf life than milk and dark chocolate, and easily picks up odors from the environment.

White chocolate is made in a five-step process. First, the ingredients are mixed to form a paste. Next, the paste is refined, reducing the particle size to a powder. It is then agitated for several hours (a process known as conching), after which further processing standardizes its viscosity and taste. Finally, the chocolate is tempered by heating, cooling and then reheating, which improves the product's appearance, stability and snap.

White chocolate was first sold commercially in tablet form in 1936 by the Swiss company Nestlé, and was long considered a children's food in Europe. It was not until the 1980s that white chocolate became popular in the United States. During the 21st century, attitudes towards white chocolate changed: markets for "premium" white chocolate grew, it became acceptable for adults in the UK to eat it, and in the US it was legally defined for the first time. A variant, blond chocolate, was created by slowly cooking white chocolate over several days.

=== Other ===
==== Aerated ====
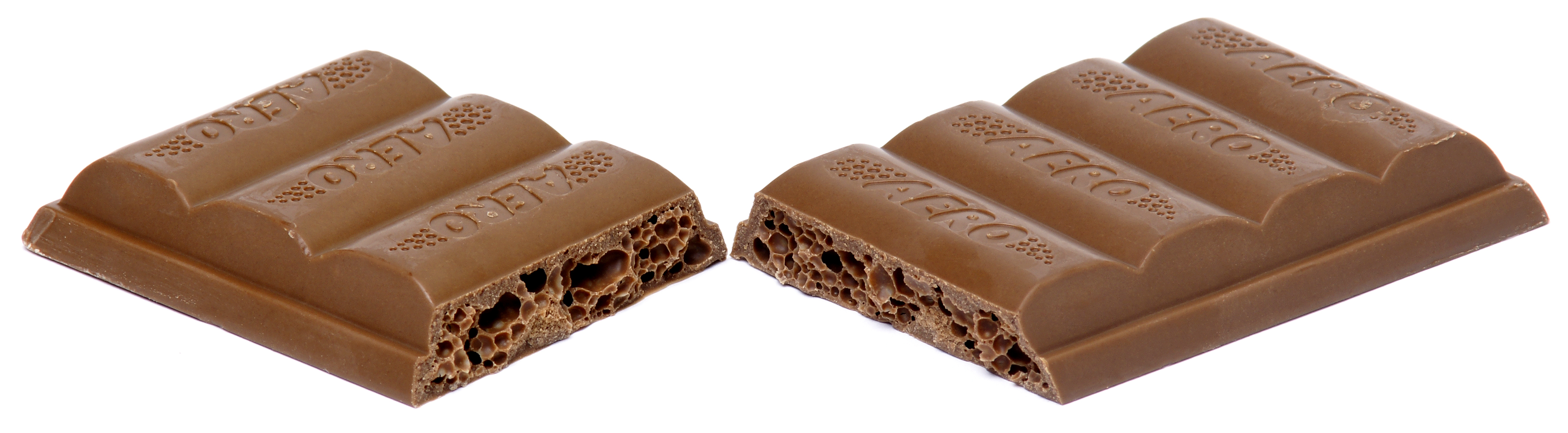
Aerated chocolate

Chocolate that has been turned into foam through adding bubbles.

==== Gianduja ====
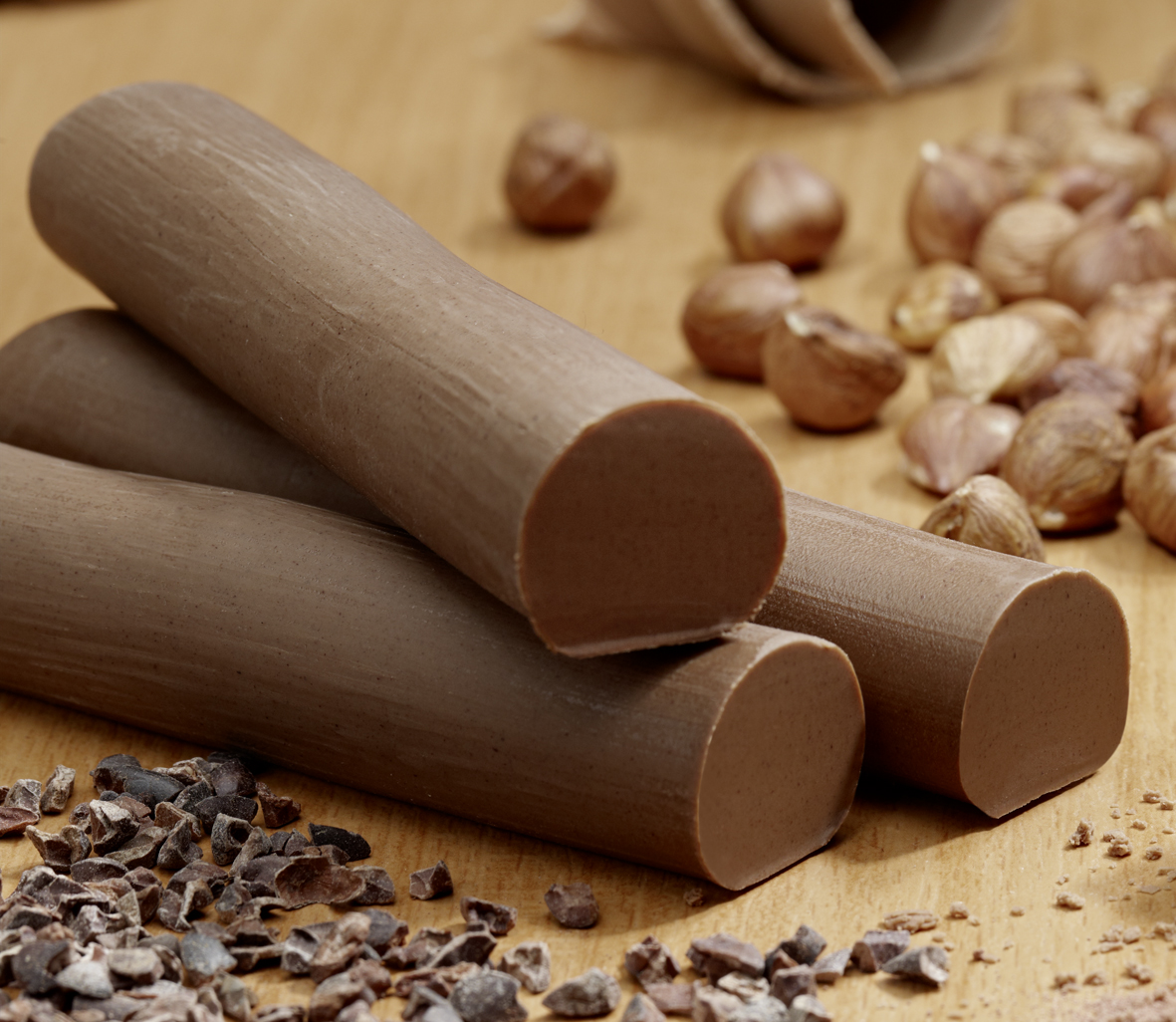
Gianduja bars

Gianduja chocolate is made by blending hazelnut butter with chocolate paste. Similarly to standard chocolate, it is made in both plain and milk versions. It may also contain other nuts, such as almond. As a bar, gianduja resembles regular chocolate, excepting the fact that it is significantly softer due to the presence of hazelnut oil.

==== Organic ====
Organic chocolate is chocolate which has been certified organic, generally meaning that there are no synthetic fertilizers or pesticides used in growing the cocoa beans producing the chocolate. As of 2016, it was a growing sector in the global chocolate industry. Organic chocolate is a socially desirable product for some consumers.

==== Raw ====
Raw chocolate is chocolate that has not been processed, heated, or mixed with other ingredients. It is sold in chocolate-growing countries and to a lesser extent in other countries. It is often promoted as being healthy. Raw chocolate includes many essential antioxidants, minerals, and vitamins. This includes protein, iron, and fiber.

==== Ruby ====
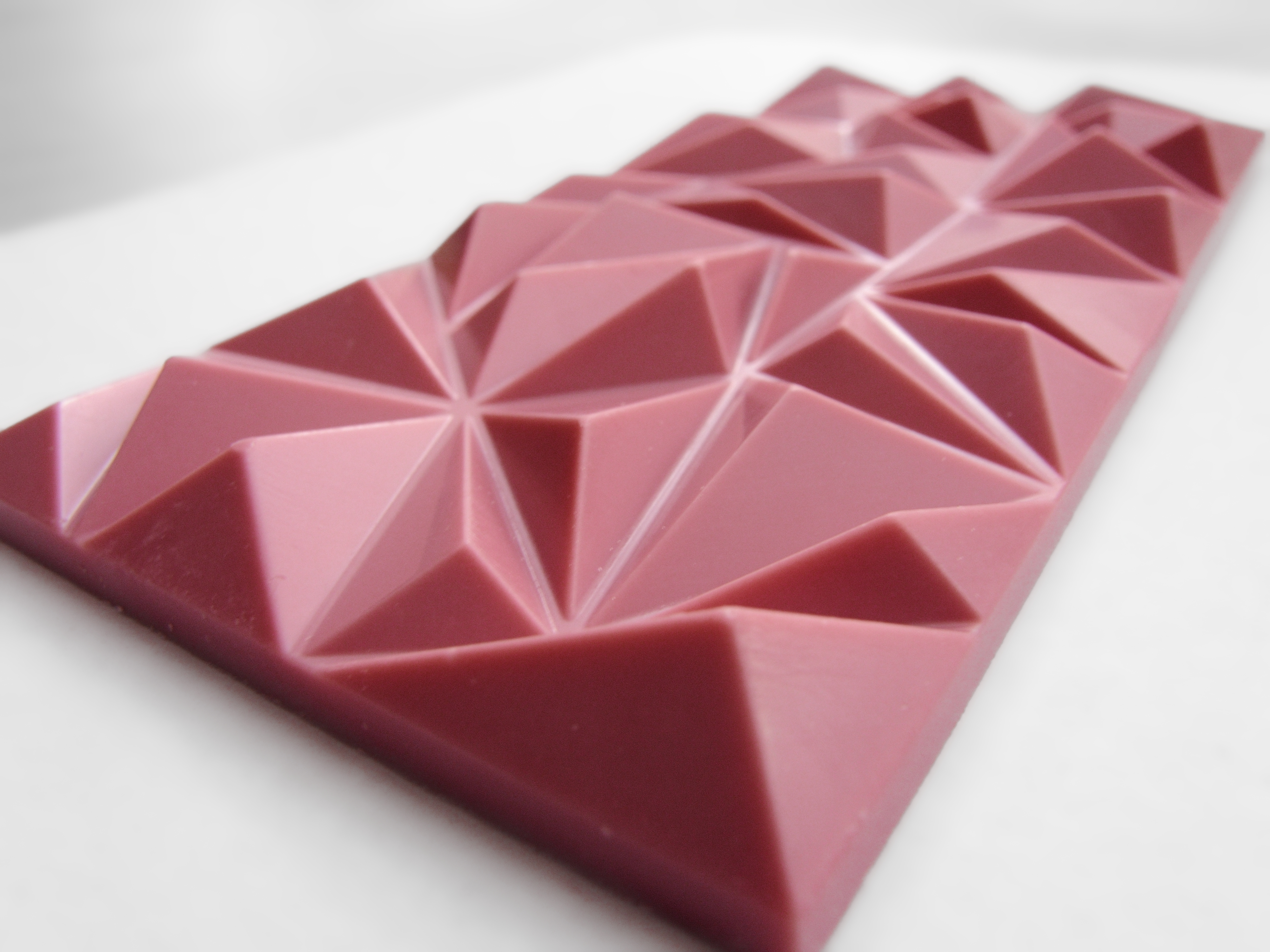
Ruby chocolate tablet

Ruby chocolate is made from the Ruby cocoa bean, resulting in a distinct red color and a different flavor, described as "sweet yet sour". It was created by Barry Callebaut, a Belgian–Swiss cocoa company. The variety was in development from 2004, and was released to the public in 2017. It has been debated by chocolate experts whether ruby chocolate constitutes a new variety of chocolate or if it is a marketing strategy.

== Confectionery ==
=== Baking ===
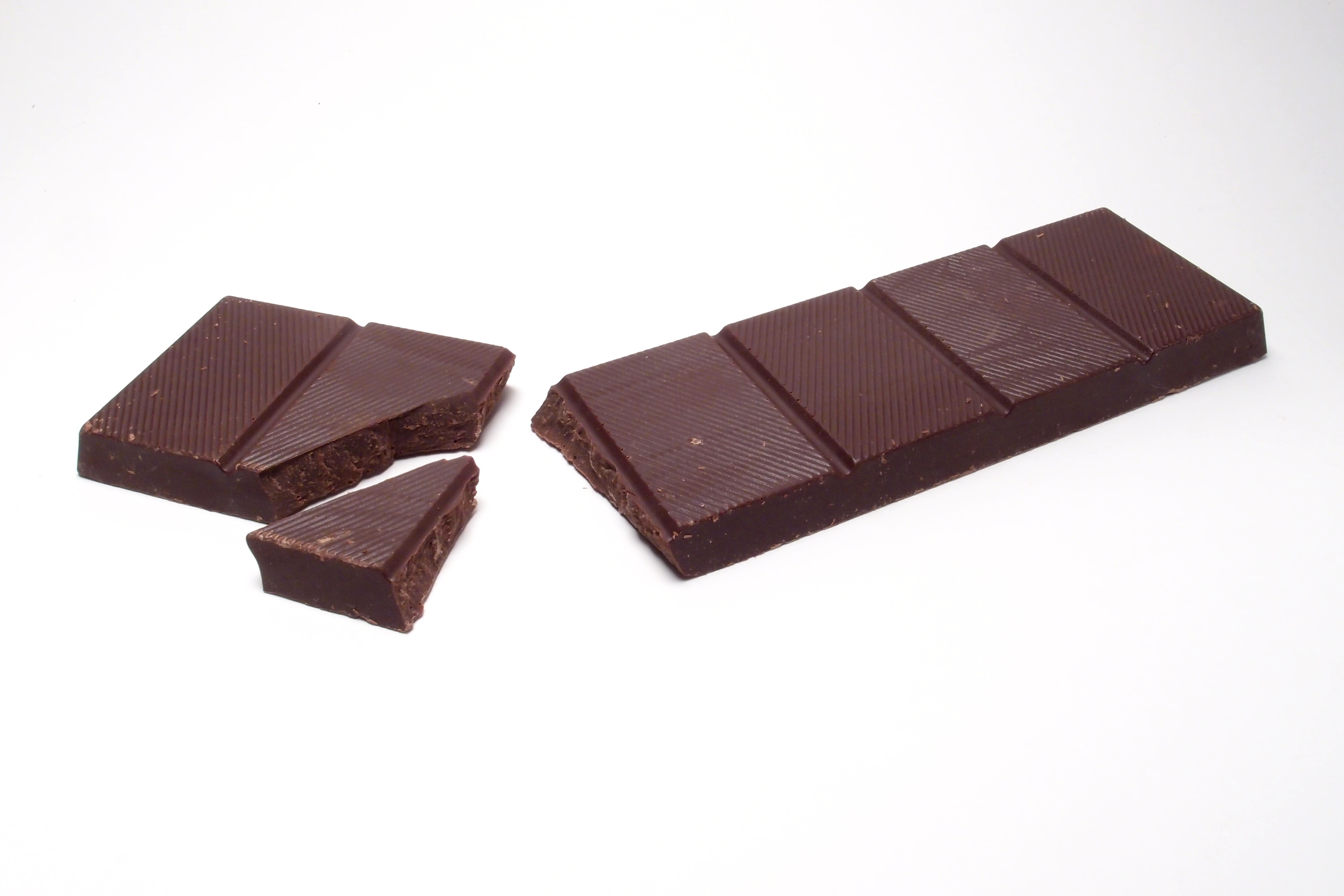
A bar of dark baking chocolate

Baking chocolate, or cooking chocolate, is chocolate intended to be used for baking and in sweet foods that may or may not be sweetened. Dark chocolate, milk chocolate, and white chocolate, are produced and marketed as baking chocolate. However, lower quality baking chocolate may not be as flavorful compared to higher-quality chocolate, and may have a different mouthfeel.

Poorly tempered or untempered chocolate may have whitish spots on the dark chocolate part, called chocolate bloom; it is an indication that sugar or fat has separated due to poor storage. It is not toxic and can be safely consumed.

In the US, baking chocolate containing no added sugar may be labeled "unsweetened chocolate".

=== Couverture ===
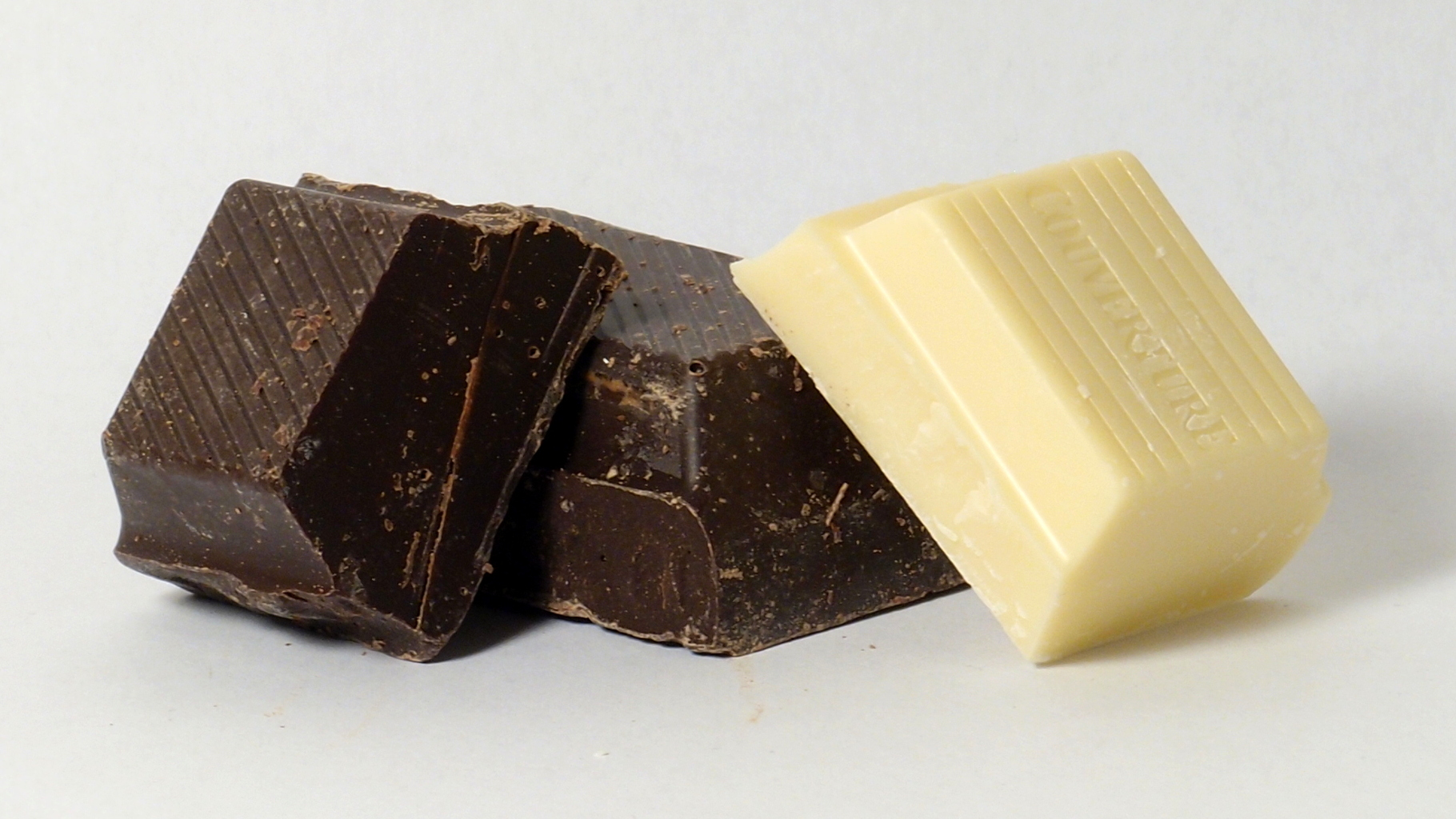
Couverture chocolate (dark and white)

Couverture chocolate is a class of high-quality chocolate containing a higher percentage of cocoa butter than other chocolate which is precisely tempered. Couverture chocolate is used by professionals for dipping, coating, molding and garnishing ('couverture' means 'covering' in French). Popular brands of couverture chocolate used by pastry chefs include: Valrhona, Lindt & Sprüngli, Scharffen Berger, Callebaut, and Guittard.

=== Compound ===
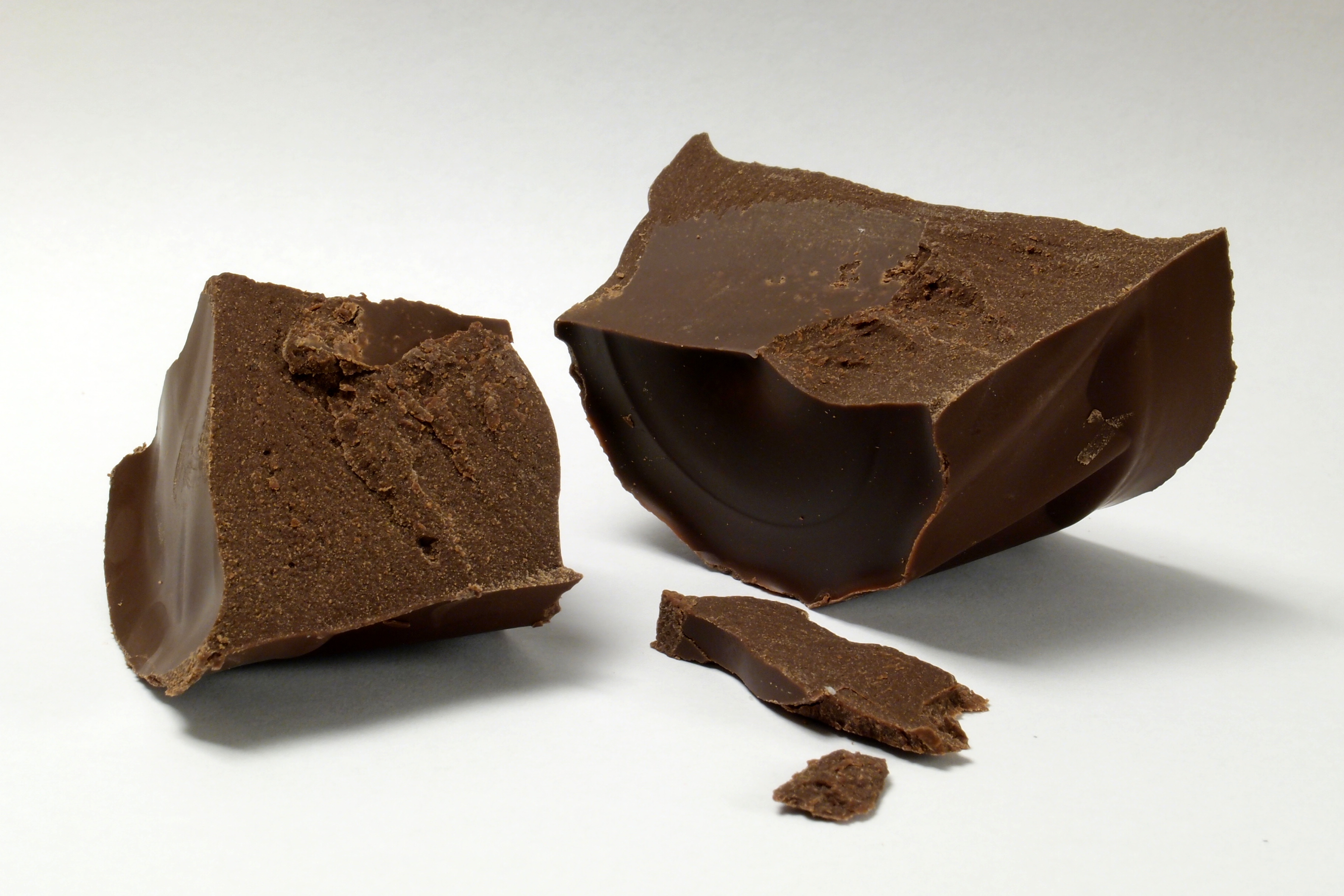
Pieces of dark compound chocolate cake coating

Compound chocolate is the name for a confection combining cocoa with other vegetable fats, usually tropical fats or hydrogenated fats, as a replacement for cocoa butter. It is often used for candy bar coatings. In many countries it can not legally be called "chocolate".

=== Modeling ===
Modeling chocolate is a chocolate paste made by melting chocolate and combining it with corn syrup, glucose syrup, or golden syrup. It is primarily used by cakemakers and pâtisseries to add decoration to cakes and pastries.

== By country ==
During the 20th century, chocolate was categorized based on where it was manufactured. During the 21st century, there was a shift away from this, in favor of describing the origins of the cocoa beans.

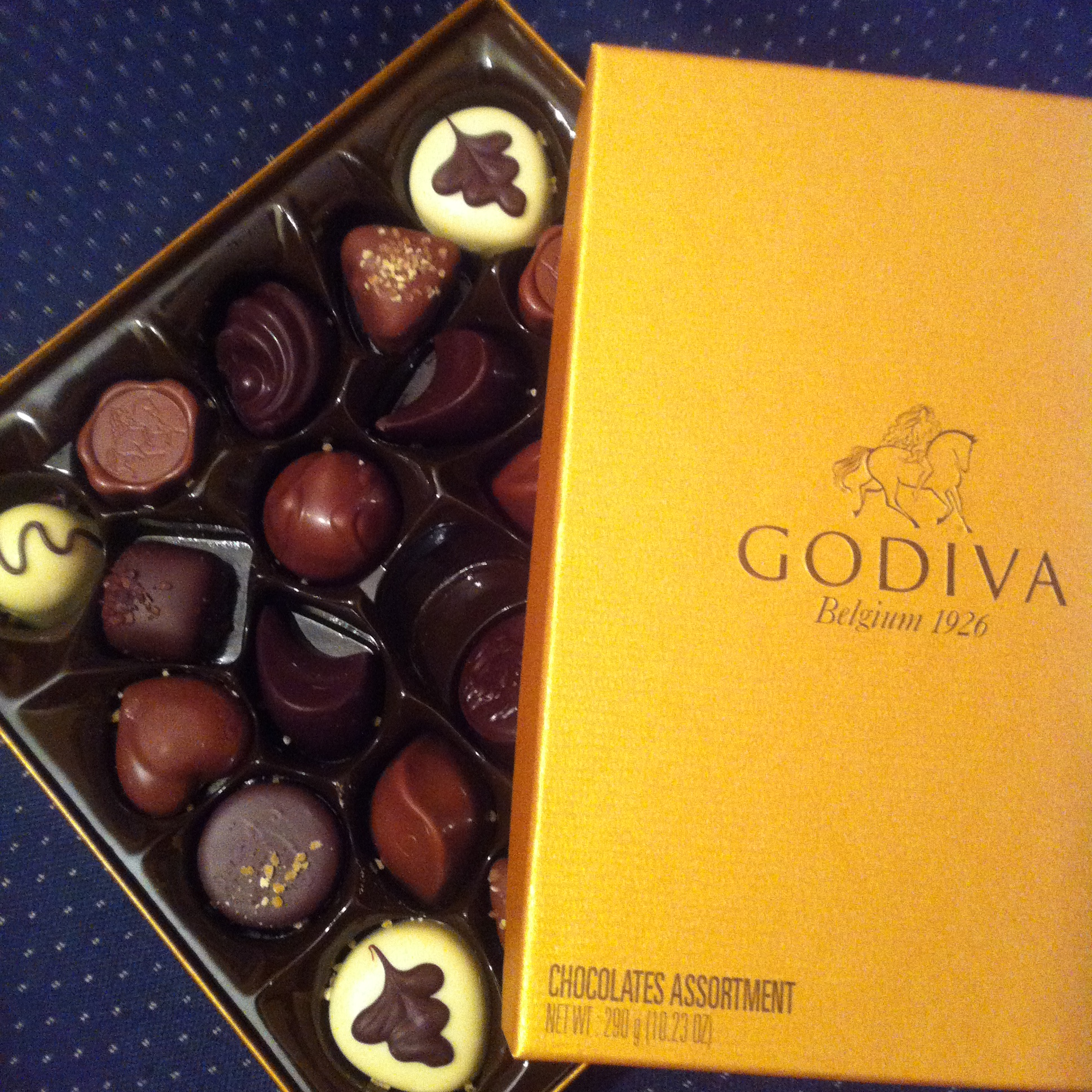
Belgian chocolates

=== Belgium ===
Belgian chocolate, according to academic Kristy Leissle, does not denote flavor or texture, but refers to bonbons.

=== France ===
French chocolate's flavor is that of a dark roast and smooth texture.

=== Switzerland ===
Swiss chocolate has a milky flavor and smooth texture.

== Legal definitions ==
Internationally recognized standards are provided by the Codex Alimentarius Commission of the Food and Agriculture Organization. These standards notably focus on total cocoa solids — i.e., the sum of all ingredients derived from dried cocoa beans — while also regulating cocoa butter and non-fat cocoa solids contents.

=== Canada ===
The legislation for cocoa and chocolate products in Canada is found in Volume 4 of the Canadian Food Compositional Standards, under the Food and Drugs Act (FDA). The Canadian Food Inspection Agency (CFIA) is responsible for the administration and enforcement of the FDR and FDA (as it relates to food).

Canadian requirements for chocolate
| Product | Cocoa butter | Milk solids | Milk fat | Non-fat cocoa solids | Total cocoa solids |
|---|---|---|---|---|---|
| Milk chocolate | ≥ 15% | ≥ 12% | ≥ 3.39% | ≥ 2.5% | ≥ 25% |
| Sweet chocolate | ≥ 18% | < 12% | | ≥ 12% | ≥ 30% |
| Chocolate, bittersweet chocolate, semi-sweet chocolate or dark chocolate | ≥ 18% | < 5% | | ≥ 14% | ≥ 35% |
| White chocolate | ≥ 20% | ≥ 14% | ≥ 3.5% | | |

The use of cocoa butter substitutes in Canada is not permitted. Chocolate sold in Canada cannot contain vegetable fats or oils.

The only sweetening agents permitted in chocolate in Canada are listed in Division 18 of the Food and Drug Regulations. Artificial sweeteners such as aspartame, sucralose, acesulfame potassium, and sugar alcohols (sorbitol, maltitol, etc.) are not permitted.

Products manufactured or imported into Canada that contain non-permitted ingredients (vegetable fats or oils, artificial sweeteners) cannot legally be called "chocolate" when sold in Canada. A non-standardized name such as "candy" must be used.

=== European Union and United Kingdom ===
There has been disagreement in the EU about the definition of chocolate; this dispute covers several issues, including the types of fat and the quantity of cocoa used. In 1999, however, the EU resolved the fat issue by allowing up to 5% of chocolate's content to be one of six alternatives to cocoa butter: illipe oil, palm oil, sal, shea butter, kokum gurgi, or mango kernel oil.

Products labelled as "family milk chocolate" elsewhere in the European Union are permitted to be labelled as simply "milk chocolate" in Malta, the UK and the Republic of Ireland.

Chocolate requirements in the European Union and United Kingdom
| Product | Total cocoa solids | Cocoa butter | Non-fat cocoa solids | Total fat (Note: "Total fat" refers to the combined cocoa butter and milk fat content) | Milk fat | Milk solids | Flour/starch |
|---|---|---|---|---|---|---|---|
| Dark chocolate | ≥ 35% | ≥ 18% | ≥ 14% | | | | |
| Couverture chocolate | ≥ 35% | ≥ 31% | ≥ 2.5% | | | | |
| Chocolate vermicelli or flakes | ≥ 32% | ≥ 12% | ≥ 14% | | | | |
| Milk chocolate | ≥ 25% | | ≥ 2.5% | ≥ 25% | ≥ 3.5% | ≥ 14% | |
| Couverture milk chocolate | ≥ 25% | | ≥ 2.5% | ≥ 31% | ≥ 3.5% | ≥ 14% | |
| Milk chocolate vermicelli or flakes | ≥ 20% | | ≥ 2.5% | ≥ 12% | ≥ 3.5% | ≥ 12% | |
| Family milk chocolate | ≥ 20% | | ≥ 2.5% | ≥ 25% | ≥ 5% | ≥ 20% | |
| Cream chocolate | ≥ 25% | | ≥ 2.5% | ≥ 25% | ≥ 5.5% | ≥ 14% | |
| Skimmed milk chocolate | ≥ 25% | | ≥ 2.5% | ≥ 25% | ≤ 1% | ≥ 14% | |
| White chocolate | | ≥ 20% | | | | ≥ 14% | |
| Chocolate a la taza | ≥ 35% | ≥ 18% | ≥ 14% | | | | ≤ 8% |
| Chocolate familiar a la taza | ≥ 30% | ≥ 18% | ≥ 12% | | | | ≤ 18% |

=== Japan ===
In Japan, "chocolate products" are classified on a complex scale. Cocoa content refers to the total amount of ingredients derived from dry cocoa beans.

Chocolate materials (チョコレート生地, chokorēto kiji):

- Pure chocolate material (純チョコレート生地, jun-chokorēto kiji)
  Cocoa content ≥35%, cocoa butter ≥18%, sucrose ≤55%, lecithin ≤0.5%, no additives other than lecithin and vanilla flavoring, C, water ≤3%
- Pure milk chocolate material (純ミルクチョコレート生地, jun-miruku chokorēto kiji)
  Cocoa content ≥21%, cocoa butter ≥18%, milk solids ≥14%, milk fats ≥3.5%, sucrose ≤55%, lecithin ≤0.5%, no additives other than lecithin and vanilla flavoring, no fats other than cocoa butter and milk fats, water ≤3%
- Chocolate material (チョコレート生地, chokorēto kiji)
  Cocoa content ≥35%, cocoa butter ≥18%, water ≤3%. It is also permitted to substitute milk solids for cocoa content as follows: cocoa content ≥21%, cocoa butter ≥18%, combined milk solids & cocoa content ≥35%, milk fats ≥3%, water ≤3%.
- Milk chocolate material (ミルクチョコレート生地, miruku chokorēto kiji)
  Cocoa content ≥21%, cocoa butter ≥18%, milk solids ≥14%, milk fats ≥3%, water ≤3%
- Quasi chocolate material (準チョコレート生地, jun-chokorēto kiji) ^{a}
  Cocoa content ≥15%, cocoa butter ≥3%, fats ≥18%, water ≤3%
- Quasi milk chocolate material (準ミルクチョコレート生地, jun-miruku chokorēto kiji)
  Cocoa content ≥7%, cocoa butter ≥3%, fats ≥18%, milk solids ≥12.5%, milk fats ≥2%, water ≤3%

Chocolate products (チョコレート製品, chokorēto seihin):

Products using milk chocolate or quasi milk chocolate as described above are handled in the same way as chocolate / quasi chocolate.

- Chocolate (チョコレート, chokorēto)
  Processed chocolate products made from chocolate material itself or containing at least 60% chocolate material. Processed chocolate products must contain at least 40% chocolate material by weight. Amongst processed chocolate products, those containing at least 10% by weight of cream and no more than 10% of water can be called raw chocolate (生チョコレート, nama chokorēto)
- Chocolate sweet (チョコレート菓子, chokorēto kashi)
  Processed chocolate products containing less than 60% chocolate material
- Quasi chocolate (準チョコレート, jun-chokorēto)
  The quasi symbol should officially be circled. Processed quasi chocolate products made from quasi chocolate material itself or containing at least 60% quasi chocolate material.
- Quasi chocolate sweet (準チョコレート菓子, jun-chokorēto kashi)
  Processed quasi chocolate products containing less than 60% quasi chocolate material

=== United States ===
The U.S. Food and Drug Administration (FDA) regulates the naming and ingredients of cocoa products:

Contrary to FAO standards, American legislation focuses on the chocolate liquor content, and not on total cocoa solids. Chocolate liquor (or cocoa mass) is the ground or melted state of the nib of the cacao bean, containing roughly equal parts cocoa butter and non-fat solids.

Semisweet and bittersweet are terms traditionally used in the United States to indicate the amount of added sugar in dark chocolate. Typically, bittersweet chocolate has less sugar than semisweet chocolate, but the two are interchangeable when baking. Both must contain a minimum of 35% chocolate liquor.

American requirements for chocolate
| Product | Chocolate liquor | Milk solids | Sugar | Cocoa butter | Milk fat |
|---|---|---|---|---|---|
| Buttermilk chocolate | ≥ 10% | ≥ 12% | | | < 3.39% |
| Milk chocolate | ≥ 10% | ≥ 12% | | | ≥ 3.39% |
| Mixed dairy product chocolates | ≥ 10% | ≥ 12% | | | |
| Skim milk chocolate | ≥ 10% | ≥ 12% | | | < 3.39% |
| Sweet chocolate | ≥ 15% | < 12% | | | |
| Semisweet or bittersweet chocolate | ≥ 35% | < 12% | | | |
| White chocolate | | ≥ 14% | ≤ 55% | ≥ 20% | ≥ 3.5% |

In March 2007, the Chocolate Manufacturers Association, whose members include Hershey's, Nestlé, and Archer Daniels Midland, began lobbying the U.S. Food and Drug Administration (FDA) to change the legal definition of chocolate to allow the substitution of "safe and suitable vegetable fats and oils" (including partially hydrogenated vegetable oils) for cocoa butter in addition to using "any sweetening agent" (including artificial sweeteners) and milk substitutes. Currently, the FDA does not allow a product to be referred to as "chocolate" if the product contains any of these ingredients. To work around this restriction, products with cocoa substitutes are often branded or labeled as "chocolatey" or "made with chocolate".

== See also ==
- Chocolate bar
- Bean-to-bar

== Sources ==
- Bau, Frédéric [in French] (2006). Chocolate Fusion: Chocolate in Cuisine (2nd English ed.). Barcelona: Montagud Editores. ISBN 978-84-7212-117-1.
- Beckett, Stephen T (2019). The Science of Chocolate (3rd ed.). Croydon, United Kingdom: Royal Society of Chemistry. ISBN 978-1-78801-235-5.
- Dizik, Alina (26 December 2013). "White chocolate, a blank slate for flavor, wins converts". The Wall Street Journal.
- Dowling, Tim (8 March 2002). "White is the new brown". The Guardian. Archived from the original on 25 September 2024.
- Falkowitz, Max (4 April 2019). "The best white chocolate, dessert's delicious underdog". Serious Eats. Archived from the original on 13 February 2025.
- Ferdman, Roberto A (11 February 2014). "Charts: Where in the world people actually like white chocolate". Quartz. Archived from the original on 7 February 2025.
- Hofberger, Randall; Tanabe, Nina Ann (2007). "Chocolate and cocoa". In Hui, Y H (ed.). Handbook of Food Products Manufacturing. New Jersey: Wiley. ISBN 978-0-470-04964-8.
- Leissle, Kristy (2018). Cocoa. Polity. ISBN 978-1-5095-1320-8. OCLC 988580966.
- Lovegren, Sylvia (2013). "Historical Overview". In Smith, Andrew F (ed.). The Oxford Encyclopedia of Food and Drink in America (2nd ed.). Oxford University Press. ISBN 978-0-19973-922-6.
- Pardek, Carina; Bohne, Hartwig [in German] (2024). "Hospitality in harmony: Mergers of tea and chocolate". In Bohne, Hartwig (ed.). Tea Cultures of Europe: Heritage and Hospitality. Berlin: De Gruyter. doi:10.1515/9783110758573-009. ISBN 978-3-11075-857-3.
- Rousseau, Daphné (28 March 2024). "Blond vs pink: French-Swiss battle for 'fourth' chocolate". Agence France-Presse. Archived from the original on 3 April 2024.
- Sethi, Simran [in Punjabi] (27 November 2017). "For those who think white chocolate isn't 'real' chocolate, have we got bars for you". The Washington Post.
- Vercet, Antonio (June 2003). "Browning of white chocolate during storage". Food Chemistry. 81 (3). doi:10.1016/S0308-8146(02)00452-1.
