= Miranda Mirosa =

New Zealand food science professor

- Awards: Fellow of the New Zealand Institute of Food Science and Technology

Academic background
- Education: University of Otago
- Thesis: Dynamic ideologies : insights from the Slow Food movement (2009)
- Doctoral advisor: Ben Wooliscroft, Robert Aitken

Miranda Mirosa is a New Zealand academic, and is a full professor in the Department of Food Science at the University of Otago, specialising in sustainability, food waste and upcycled food products. She is a Fellow of the New Zealand Institute of Food Science and Technology.

== Academic career ==
Mirosa completed a PhD titled Dynamic ideologies: insights from the Slow Food movement at the University of Otago in 2009. She then joined the faculty of the University of Otago, rising to associate professor in 2018 and full professor in 2023.

Mirosa has a background in consumer behaviour and marketing, which she applies in the area of food consumption and sustainability. Mirosa is interested in what people eat and why, how they make decisions about consumption, and how to influence those choices to improve sustainability and health. Mirosa prepared the Mirosa Report, a briefing to the 2020 Parliamentary Environmental Committee on food waste. One of her key recommendations in the report was that New Zealand stakeholders needed to develop a consensus around how to gather data on food waste, and what actions to take. Mirosa estimates that around 30% of food globally is wasted. She is leading a collaborative project with retirement village providers to cut food waste from the 30 million meals prepared annually in the sector, funded by the Climate Emergency Response Fund, and designed a banquet for 120 people with upcycled food.

Mirosa is the Director of the four-year University of Otago Food Waste Innovation Research Theme and as of 2024 is Head of the Department of Food Science. She was a keynote speaker at the WasteMinz conference in Hamilton. Mirosa is part of the national food research centre, the Riddet Institute, and founding Chairperson of the New Zealand Food Waste Champions 12.3 Trust, which aims to meet the UN Sustainable Development Goal Target 12.3 by halving food waste by 2030.

== Honours and awards ==
In 2018 Mirosa was awarded Otago's Science Division Community Engagement Award "for her wide proactive engagement with community, organisations and media, both locally and internationally".

Mirosa was appointed as a Fellow of the New Zealand Institute of Food Science and Technology in 2021.

== Selected works ==
- Charlene Li; Mirosa, Miranda; Bremer, Phillip J. (2020). "Review of Online Food Delivery Platforms and their Impacts on Sustainability". Sustainability. 12 (14): 5528. doi:10.3390/su12145528. Wikidata Q124254253.
- Mirosa, Miranda; Lawson, Rob (2012). "Revealing the lifestyles of local food consumers". British Food Journal. 114 (6): 816–825. doi:10.1108/00070701211234345. Wikidata Q124254288.
- Garrett Lentz; Sean Connelly; Mirosa, Miranda; Jowett, Tim Timothy Winston Dudley (2018). "Gauging attitudes and behaviours: Meat consumption and potential reduction". Appetite. 127: 230–241. doi:10.1016/j.appet.2018.04.015. PMID 29751024. Wikidata Q88641714.
- Sarah Goonan; Mirosa, Miranda; Spence, Heather (2013). "Getting a taste for food waste: a mixed methods ethnographic study into hospital food waste before patient consumption conducted at three New Zealand foodservice facilities". Journal of the Academy of Nutrition and Dietetics. 114 (1): 63–71. doi:10.1016/j.jand.2013.09.022. PMID 24231365. Wikidata Q45877584.
- Pui Yee Lee; Lusk, Karen Ann; Mirosa, Miranda; Oey, Indrawati (2013). "The role of personal values in Chinese consumers' food consumption decisions. A case study of healthy drinks". Appetite. 73: 95–104. doi:10.1016/j.appet.2013.11.001. PMID 24231428. Wikidata Q86732794.
- Mirosa, Miranda; Harriet Munro; Ella Mangan-Walker; Pearson, David (2016). "Reducing waste of food left on plates: Interventions based on means-end chain analysis of customers in foodservice sector". British Food Journal. 118 (9): 2326–2343. doi:10.1108/bfj-12-2015-0460. Wikidata Q124254311.
