= Brutieridin =

Names
- IUPAC name 5-[[(2R,3S,4S,5R,6S)-3,4-Dihydroxy-6-[[(2S)-5-hydroxy-2-(3-hydroxy-4-methoxyphenyl)-4-oxo-2,3-dihydrochromen-7-yl]oxy]-5-[(2S,3R,4R,5R,6S)-3,4,5-trihydroxy-6-methyloxan-2-yl]oxyoxan-2-yl]methoxy]-3-hydroxy-3-methyl-5-oxopentanoic acid

Identifiers
CAS Number	1162664-57-4
3D model (JSmol)	Interactive image
PubChem CID	45279710
CompTox Dashboard (EPA)	DTXSID701336368
- InChI: InChI=1S/C34H42O19/c1-13-26(41)28(43)30(45)32(49-13)53-31-29(44)27(42)22(12-48-24(40)11-34(2,46)10-23(38)39)52-33(31)50-15-7-17(36)25-18(37)9-20(51-21(25)8-15)14-4-5-19(47-3)16(35)6-14/h4-8,13,20,22,26-33,35-36,41-46H,9-12H2,1-3H3,(H,38,39)/t13-,20-,22+,26-,27+,28+,29-,30+,31+,32-,33+,34?/m0/s1 Key: SHCWOSSXLGIQEQ-CZFUJNBSSA-N
- SMILES: C[C@H]1[C@@H]([C@H]([C@H]([C@@H](O1)O[C@@H]2[C@H]([C@@H]([C@H](O[C@H]2OC3=CC(=C4C(=O)C[C@H](OC4=C3)C5=CC(=C(C=C5)OC)O)O)COC(=O)CC(C)(CC(=O)O)O)O)O)O)O)O

Properties
Chemical formula	C_{34}H_{42}O_{19}
Molar mass	754.691 g·mol^{−1}
- Except where otherwise noted, data are given for materials in their standard state (at 25 °C [77 °F], 100 kPa). Infobox references

Brutieridin is a flavanone glycoside. Brutieridin was discovered in bergamot orange juice and exhibits statin-like properties in preclinical research, as well as an anticholesterolaemic effect.

== See also ==
- Melitidin

== Bibliography ==
- Di Donna, Leonardo; Taverna, Domenico; Mazzotti, Fabio; Benabdelkamel, Hicham; Attya, Mohamed; Napoli, Anna; Sindona, Giovanni (2013). "Comprehensive assay of flavanones in citrus juices and beverages by UHPLC–ESI-MS/MS and derivatization chemistry". Food Chemistry. 141 (3): 2328–2333. doi:10.1016/j.foodchem.2013.05.034. ISSN 0308-8146. PMID 23870965.
- Mencherini, Teresa; Campone, Luca; Piccinelli, Anna Lisa; García Mesa, Milagros; Sánchez, Dulce María; Aquino, Rita Patrizia; Rastrelli, Luca (2013). "HPLC-PDA-MS and NMR Characterization of a Hydroalcoholic Extract of Citrus aurantium L. var.amara Peel with Antiedematogenic Activity". Journal of Agricultural and Food Chemistry. 61 (8): 1686–1693. Bibcode:2013JAFC...61.1686M. doi:10.1021/jf302815t. ISSN 0021-8561. PMID 22957519.
- Barreca, Davide; Bellocco, Ersilia; Caristi, Corrado; Leuzzi, Ugo; Gattuso, Giuseppe (2011). "Distribution of C- and O-glycosyl flavonoids, (3-hydroxy-3-methylglutaryl)glycosyl flavanones and furocoumarins in Citrus aurantium L. juice". Food Chemistry. 124 (2): 576–582. doi:10.1016/j.foodchem.2010.06.076. ISSN 0308-8146.
- Di Donna, Leonardo; Taverna, Domenico; Mazzotti, Fabio; Benabdelkamel, Hicham; Attya, Mohamed; Napoli, Anna; Sindona, Giovanni (2013). "Comprehensive assay of flavanones in citrus juices and beverages by UHPLC–ESI-MS/MS and derivatization chemistry". Food Chemistry. 141 (3): 2328–2333. doi:10.1016/j.foodchem.2013.05.034. ISSN 0308-8146. PMID 23870965.
