= Melitidin =

Names
- IUPAC name 5-[[(2R,3S,4S,5R,6S)-3,4-Dihydroxy-6-[[(2S)-5-hydroxy-2-(4-hydroxyphenyl)-4-oxo-2,3-dihydrochromen-7-yl]oxy]-5-[(2S,3R,4R,5R,6S)-3,4,5-trihydroxy-6-methyloxan-2-yl]oxyoxan-2-yl]methoxy]-3-hydroxy-3-methyl-5-oxopentanoic acid

Identifiers
CAS Number	1162664-58-5
3D model (JSmol)	Interactive image
ChemSpider	128922165
PubChem CID	168011951
- InChI: InChI=1S/C33H40O18/c1-13-25(40)27(42)29(44)31(47-13)51-30-28(43)26(41)21(12-46-23(39)11-33(2,45)10-22(37)38)50-32(30)48-16-7-17(35)24-18(36)9-19(49-20(24)8-16)14-3-5-15(34)6-4-14/h3-8,13,19,21,25-32,34-35,40-45H,9-12H2,1-2H3,(H,37,38)/t13-,19-,21+,25-,26+,27+,28-,29+,30+,31-,32+,33?/m0/s1 Key: NEFQWEGQYZRALY-LIRNRXGKSA-N
- SMILES: C[C@H]1[C@@H]([C@H]([C@H]([C@@H](O1)O[C@@H]2[C@H]([C@@H]([C@H](O[C@H]2OC3=CC(=C4C(=O)C[C@H](OC4=C3)C5=CC=C(C=C5)O)O)COC(=O)CC(C)(CC(=O)O)O)O)O)O)O)O

Properties
Chemical formula	C_{33}H_{40}O_{18}
Molar mass	724.665 g·mol^{−1}
- Except where otherwise noted, data are given for materials in their standard state (at 25 °C [77 °F], 100 kPa). Infobox references

Melitidin is a flavanone glycoside. Melitidin was discovered in bergamot orange juice and exhibits statin-like properties in preclinical research.

== See also ==
- Brutieridin

== Bibliography ==
- Zou, W; Wang Y; Liu H; Luo Y; Chen S; Su W (2013). "Melitidin: a flavanone glycoside from Citrus grandis 'Tomentosa'". Nat Prod Commun. 8 (4): 457–458. PMID 23738451.
- Mencherini, Teresa; Campone, Luca; Piccinelli, Anna Lisa; García Mesa, Milagros; Sánchez, Dulce María; Aquino, Rita Patrizia; Rastrelli, Luca (2013). "HPLC-PDA-MS and NMR Characterization of a Hydroalcoholic Extract of Citrus aurantium L. var.amara Peel with Antiedematogenic Activity". Journal of Agricultural and Food Chemistry. 61 (8): 1686–1693. doi:10.1021/jf302815t. ISSN 0021-8561. PMID 22957519.
- Barreca, Davide; Bellocco, Ersilia; Caristi, Corrado; Leuzzi, Ugo; Gattuso, Giuseppe (2011). "Distribution of C- and O-glycosyl flavonoids, (3-hydroxy-3-methylglutaryl)glycosyl flavanones and furocoumarins in Citrus aurantium L. juice". Food Chemistry. 124 (2): 576–582. doi:10.1016/j.foodchem.2010.06.076. ISSN 0308-8146.
- Di Donna, Leonardo; Taverna, Domenico; Mazzotti, Fabio; Benabdelkamel, Hicham; Attya, Mohamed; Napoli, Anna; Sindona, Giovanni (2013). "Comprehensive assay of flavanones in citrus juices and beverages by UHPLC–ESI-MS/MS and derivatization chemistry". Food Chemistry. 141 (3): 2328–2333. doi:10.1016/j.foodchem.2013.05.034. ISSN 0308-8146. PMID 23870965.
