= Olga Martín-Belloso =

Spanish food scientist

- Born: 8 July 1960 (age 66); Calahorra
- Education: University of Zaragoza
- Awards: Narcís Monturiol medal (2018)
- Scientific career
- Workplaces: University of Lleida

Olga Martín-Belloso (born 8 July 1960) is a Spanish food scientist and Professor at the University of Lleida. She was the first Spanish woman to join the International Union of Food Science and Technology and is President of the European Federation of Food Science and Technology. Martín-Belloso works on new technologies for food processing.

== Early life and education ==
Martín-Belloso is a native of Calahorra. She attended the Colegio de las Teresianas, which she graduated in 1976. She studied chemical sciences at the University of Zaragoza. She earned her bachelor's degree in 1982 and her PhD at the same institution in 1991. She completed her PhD research at the Asociación de Investigación de Industrias de conservas vegetales (the National Technical Center of Canned Vegetables) in San Adrián.

== Research and career ==
Martín-Belloso was made a professor at the University of Lleida in 1992. She leads the Department of Food Technology. Her interests include food preservation using pulsed electric fields and food product development. Martín-Belloso has studied coatings, including emulsion based nanostructures, that incorporate active ingredients such as antimicrobials, anti-browning compounds and texture enhancers.

=== Academic service ===
In 2016, Martín-Belloso became the first Spanish Woman to join the International Union of Food Science and Technology. She is Director of the Doctoral School at the University of Lleida. She is the Spanish Ambassador for the Global Harmonization Task Force. She was elected the President of the European Federation of Food Science and Technology in 2019.

=== Books ===
Martín-Belloso has contributed to many books, including;

- Martín-Belloso, Olga (2015). Regulating Safety of Traditional and Ethnic Foods. Academic Press. ISBN 978-0128006054.
- Martín-Belloso, Olga (2010). Advances in Fresh-Cut Fruits and Vegetables Processing (Food Preservation Technology). CRC press. ISBN 978-1420071214.

=== Awards and honours ===
Her awards and honours include;

- 2009 ICREA Academy Award
- 2018 Generalitat de Catalunya Narcís Monturiol medal
- 2015 Fellow of the Institute of Food Technologists
- 2019 Núvol Scientists You Should Know
