= Janis Swan =

New Zealand food process engineering academic

Janis Swan MNZM
- Other name: Janis Elizabeth Swan
- Education: University of Waterloo
- Scientific career
- Fields: Meat process engineering
- Workplaces: MAFTech; MIRINZ; University of Waikato
- Website: http://www.waikato.ac.nz/staff-profiles/people/jswan

Janis Elizabeth Swan MNZM (née Trout) is a New Zealand food process engineering academic. She is currently an emeritus professor at the University of Waikato.

== Academic and research career ==
Educated at Horowhenua College in Levin, Swan went on to study biotechnology at Massey University, completing a Bachelor of Technology in 1969 and a Master of Technology in 1971. After working in industry for two years, she returned to Massey as a lecturer. She was awarded a Walter Mulholland Fellowship, which enabled her to undertake doctoral studies at the University of Waterloo in Canada, and she completed her PhD on the modelling of fungal growth on cellulose pulp in airlift fermenters in 1977.

Swan returned to New Zealand, and spent three years as a post-doctoral research at the Ministry of Agriculture and Fisheries at Ruakura developing a process for the extraction of protein from grass. She then spent 16 years at the Meat Industry Research Institute of New Zealand, also at Ruakura, where she worked on rendering and blood processing, as well as meat product development. Swan returned to academia in 1997, becoming a full professor at the University of Waikato. She served as head of the Department of Materials and Process Engineering from 1997 to 2003; head of the Department of Engineering from 2006 to 2008; associate dean of engineering from 2005 to 2105, deputy dean of the Faculty of Science and Engineering from 2012 to 2015; and acting dean of engineering between 2015 and 2016. She was the first woman in New Zealand to lead an engineering school. Swan was a Marsden Fund council member between 2010 and 2013. On her retirement from Waikato, she was conferred the title of emeritus professor in 2018.

== Honours and awards ==
In the 2009 New Year Honours, Swan was appointed a Member of the New Zealand Order of Merit, for services to engineering. She was elected a Fellow of the New Zealand Institute of Food Science and Technology in 2006, and of the Institute of Professional Engineers New Zealand in 2005. In 2010, she won the J. C. Andrews Award from the New Zealand Institute of Food Science and Technology, their highest honour.

In 2018, Swan was named as a Distinguished Fellow of Engineering New Zealand, the second woman to be so honoured.

== Selected works ==
- Du, Yanhai, Nigel M. Sammes, Geoffrey A. Tompsett, Deliang Zhang, Janis Swan, and Mark Bowden. "Extruded Tubular Strontium-and Magnesium-Doped Lanthanum Gallate, Gadolinium-Doped Ceria, and Yttria-Stabilized Zirconia Electrolytes Mechanical and Thermal Properties." Journal of the Electrochemical Society 150, no. 1 (2003): A74-A78.
- Farouk, M. M., W. K. Hall, and Janis E. Swan. "Attributes of beef sausage batters, patties and restructured roasts from two boning systems." Journal of Muscle Foods 11, no. 3 (2000): 197–212.
- Thavanayagam, Gnanavinthan, Kim L. Pickering, Janis E. Swan, and Peng Cao. "Analysis of rheological behaviour of titanium feedstocks formulated with a water-soluble binder system for powder injection moulding." Powder Technology 269 (2015): 227–232.
- Swan, Janis Elizabeth, and P. J. Torley. "Collagen: structure, function and uses." (1991).
- Lay, Mark C., Levinia K. Paku, and Janis E. Swan. "Work placement reports: Student perceptions." (2008): 1–7.
