= Siew-Young Quek =

Professor of chemical sciences in New Zealand

- Awards: Fellow of the New Zealand Institute of Food Science and Technology

Academic background
- Education: University of Birmingham

Siew-Young Quek is a New Zealand academic and is a full professor at the University of Auckland, specialising in bioactive and functional food ingredients, lipid science and food processing.

== Academic career ==
Quek earned a Bachelor of Science with Honours in biochemistry from the University of Malaysia, and then completed a PhD in chemical engineering at the University of Birmingham in 1999. Quek spent four years lecturing at the University of Putra Malaysia, before joining the faculty of the University of Auckland in 2004, rising to full professor in 2020. Quek has been a visiting scholar at Guelph Food Research Center in Canada, the University of Massachusetts and Xiamen University, China. She is the editor-in-chief of the Elsevier journal Future Foods. Quek is part of the Riddet Institute Centre of Research Excellence.

One focus of Quek's research is functional foods, and bioactive ingredients, and methods to stabilise and deliver functional ingredients, including co- and micro-encapsulation. She also works on lipid science, and the processing and safety of food.

== Awards and honours ==
Quek won a gold medal at the Geneva International Exhibition of Invention in 2005.

Quek won a University of Auckland Excellence in Teaching Award in 2007. Quek won a Gold Medal at the University of Putra Malaysia's University Invention & Research Competition in 2002, and won the 2002 National Invention and Innovation Competition on Science & Technology, run by the Ministry of Sciences, Technology and Environment of Malaysia.

In 2012, she was made Fellow of New Zealand Institute of Food Science & Technology.

In 2014–15, Quek was Shanghai Outstanding Overseas Scholar, and in 2017, she was the overseas expert in food science in the 100-Talent Programme of Hunan Province.

Quek is a Guest Professor of Jiangnan University and the Oil Crops Research Institute of the Chinese Academy of Agricultural Science. From 2016 to 2021 she was an honorary professor of Jilin University.

== Selected works ==
- Yun Ping Neo; Sudip Ray; Jianyong Jin; Marija Gizdavic-Nikolaidis; Michel K. Nieuwoudt; Dongyan Liu; Siew-Young Quek (2012). "Encapsulation of food grade antioxidant in natural biopolymer by electrospinning technique: a physicochemical study based on zein-gallic acid system". Food Chemistry. 136 (2): 1013–1021. doi:10.1016/j.foodchem.2012.09.010. PMID 23122157. Wikidata Q85347716.
- Fraser, Karl; Scott J Harrison; Geoff A Lane; Otter, Don E.; Yacine Hemar; Siew-Young Quek; Rasmussen, Susanne (2012). "Non-targeted analysis of tea by hydrophilic interaction liquid chromatography and high resolution mass spectrometry". Food Chemistry. 134 (3): 1616–1623. doi:10.1016/j.foodchem.2012.03.045. PMID 25005990. Wikidata Q45357390.
- Anusooya S Sivam; Dongxiao Sun-Waterhouse; Waterhouse, Geoffrey Ivan Neil; Siew-Young Quek; Perera, Conrad (2011). "Physicochemical properties of bread dough and finished bread with added pectin fiber and phenolic antioxidants". Journal of Food Science. 76 (3): H97–H107. doi:10.1111/j.1750-3841.2011.02086.x. PMID 21535837. Wikidata Q44109620.
- Fraser, Karl; Geoff A Lane; Otter, Don E.; Scott J Harrison; Siew-Young Quek; Yacine Hemar; Rasmussen, Susanne (2013). "Monitoring tea fermentation/manufacturing by direct analysis in real time (DART) mass spectrometry". Food Chemistry. 141 (3): 2060–2065. doi:10.1016/j.foodchem.2013.05.054. PMID 23870928. Wikidata Q45300360.
- Coralia V Garcia; Ralph J Stevenson; Atkinson, Ross G.; Robert A Winz; Siew-Young Quek (2012). "Changes in the bound aroma profiles of 'Hayward' and 'Hort16A' kiwifruit (Actinidia spp.) during ripening and GC-olfactometry analysis". Food Chemistry. 137 (1–4): 45–54. doi:10.1016/j.foodchem.2012.10.002. PMID 23199989. Wikidata Q45147447.
