= Tempered chocolate =

Technique in chocolate manufacture

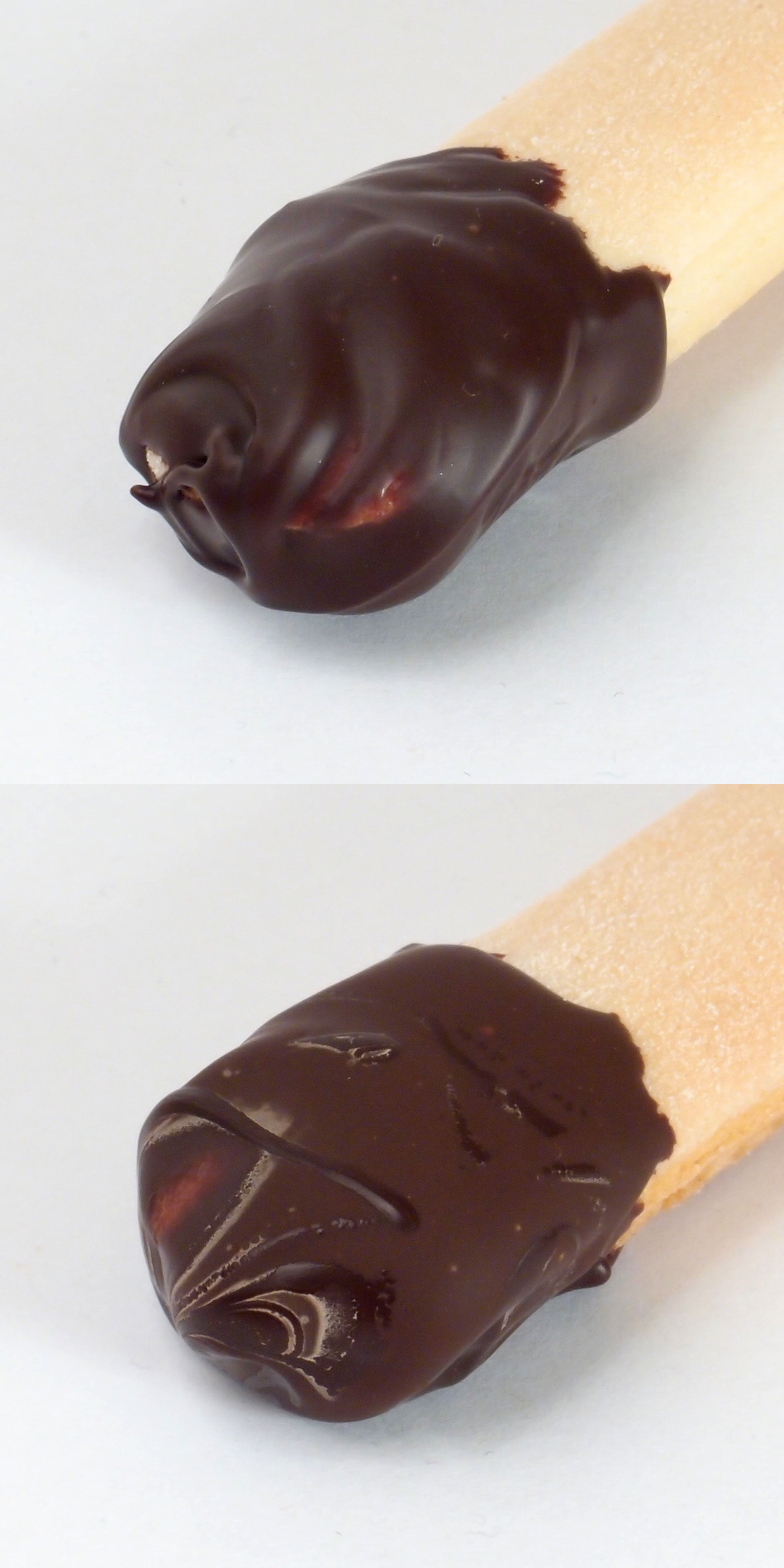
Tempered (upper sample) and untempered chocolate

Tempering is a technique applied in chocolate production to create chocolate that is glossy, has a good snap and smoother texture and is more resistant to chocolate bloom. It involves cooling liquid chocolate while agitating it until a small amount of cocoa butter crystallizes. The liquid is then heated to maintain only the most stable crystal forms, which serve as nuclei for the rest of the cocoa butter to solidify around.

== History ==
Crystallisation of chocolate was already a concern by the mid-19th century. A textbook of the time for chocolate making notes that good quality chocolate must have a shiny and smooth surface, a clean break, and an optimal mouthfeel.

In 1902, chocolate makers thought the texture and appearance were improved when chocolate was cooled rapidly. By 1931, the tempering process was developed to control chocolate bloom, but it was not understood how it worked. The effects on the crystal structure were not understood until the 1970s. By the 1950s, the tempering process involved cooling chocolate to 30 °C (86 °F), until it was "mushy", then raising to 33 °C (91 °F) before it was molded.

The invention of tempered chocolate has been attributed to Jean Tobler.

== Background ==
By definition, most of the fat in chocolate is cocoa butter. Like all fats, cocoa butter is made up of several triglycerides, which solidify at different temperatures and rates. When these crystallize, they can form six different structures (traditionally named I through VI by the chocolate industry), and only one of these (V) produces the snap and gloss desired by consumers. (Note: More recent research has found III is a mix of II and IV rather than a distinct form.) This ability of cocoa butter to crystallize in different forms is known as polymorphism. Of the forms the cocoa butter takes, ones that are more dense and have lower energy structures are harder to melt. Chocolate will naturally crystallize into Form V when it is cooled to 34 °C (93 °F) and then mixed for several days. Tempering is a process to speed this up.

== Outline ==
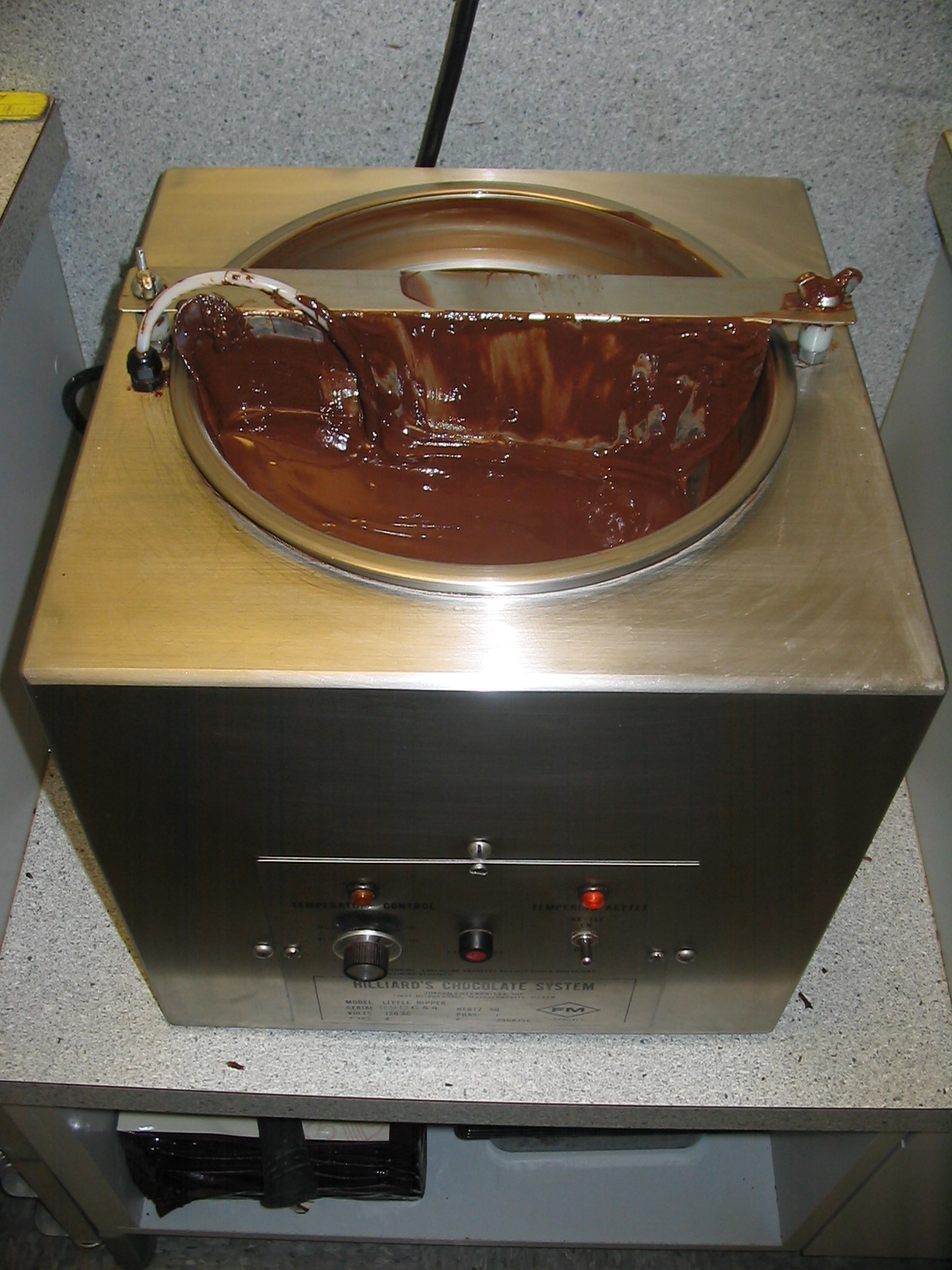
Chocolate tempering machine

The purpose of tempering is to create the most stable form of cocoa butter. In tempering, a small amount of fat is crystallized (1–3%) to a specific structure, creating nuclei which help the rest of the fat crystallize in the correct form.

Tempering has four steps:

1. Heat chocolate to 40 °C (104 °F) to melt the liquid completely
2. Cool to 32 °C (90 °F) to begin crystallization
3. Crystallize at 27 °C (81 °F)
4. Heat to convert any unstable crystals 29–31 °C (84–88 °F)

The liquid is subjected to high shear, which breaks down crystals and distributes them throughout the liquid. Broken down, more nuclei then exist for fat to crystallize onto. The shear also creates heat, which allows unstable crystals to melt, and later recrystallize, now in the ideal Form V. If there is too much heat however, all the crystals will melt. Over-tempering increases hardness and stickiness, reducing gloss and lightness. After the chocolate is tempered, it is ready for uses such as depositing in molds or being used in an enrober. For these uses, the chocolate is cooled, allowing the fats in the liquid chocolate to crystallize on the nuclei.

Chocolate bloom, a white powdery substance, can appear on the surface of chocolate if it is tempered incorrectly. Untempered chocolate can have a gritty texture, as it can contain chocolate crystals with melting points greater than the temperature of the mouth.

== Effect of additives ==
Tempering milk chocolate is more challenging than tempering dark chocolate, as the milk fat in milk chocolate affects how it sets and its final texture. The milk fat lowers the temperature needed for the crystal to seed, reducing it to 84.9 °F (29.4 °C), compared to 94.1 °F (34.5 °C) for dark chocolate. Tempering milk chocolate is also made more difficult in some countries where different fats can be substituted for cocoa butter, as these fats, like milk fats, alter the texture and properties of the chocolate as a eutectic system is formed.

Sugar lowers the melting point of crystal structures, as the sugar molecules are theorized to act as crystallization nuclei. The addition of lecithin to chocolate slows the rate at which fat crystallizes, as researchers theorize the lecithin coats the sugar molecules, creating a surface that the fat has more difficulty crystallizing onto.

== Industry ==
Output of temper meter, showing chocolate that is (a) under-tempered; (b) well-tempered; (c) over-tempered

The conditions needed for tempering are difficult to control in large-scale productions.

Chocolate, stored before tempering at around 45 °C (113 °F), must be cooled for the fat to crystallize. They are cooled in tempering machines, where chocolate is stirred so it all touches the cool sides. As it is stirred, the material is sheared. The faster it is sheared, the faster the rate of crystallization. As it is sheared in tempering machines, chocolate is worked upwards, through about three or four different temperature zones depending on the machine. In the first zone, the temperature is cooled to the point where crystals can form. In the second, the temperature is reduced further to create different types of crystals, and it is sheared at a higher rate. In the third and final, the temperature is raised, as any correctly formed crystals, which are heat resistant, will not melt in this stage. Some machines include a final stage, where the nuclei are allowed to stabilize by continuing to shear and slowly heat the chocolate. This is known as maturing the temper.

In small-scale production, tempering is done by hand. This is done on a marble table, where chocolate can be moved across different areas which are heated to different temperatures. Initially poured on a cooler area, chocolate is mixed using a scraper, causing crystals to form. It is then moved to a warmer part of the table, where unusable crystals melt. Skilled chocolate makers assess if chocolate has tempered by putting some chocolate on their lip; they can tell it is tempered when they can feel a cooling sensation. Other chocolate makers use a machine known as a "temper meter". This machine observes whether chocolate sets very quickly when cooled, indicating it has been successfully tempered. It is desirable for enrobing and molding to have the chocolate begin to set at a higher temperature. More sophisticated devices measuring whether chocolate is tempered use electric cooling to standardize the rate of cooling and analyze the results using computers. The form of crystals present can be measured using a differential scanning calorimeter.

== Domestic ==
In a home setting, small amounts of set chocolate are grated into liquid chocolate that has been cooled to 30 °C (86 °F). This technique of tempering only works with chocolate containing cocoa butter, and requires the grated chocolate be distributed throughout the liquid.

== Tempering ==
The fats in cocoa butter can crystallize in six different forms (polymorphous crystallization). The primary purpose of tempering is to assure that only the best form, Type V, is present. The six different crystal forms have different properties.

| Crystal | Melting temp. | Notes |
|---|---|---|
| I | 17 °C (63 °F) | Soft, crumbly, melts too easily |
| II | 21 °C (70 °F) | Soft, crumbly, melts too easily |
| III | 26 °C (79 °F) | Firm, poor snap, melts too easily |
| IV | 28 °C (82 °F) | Firm, good snap, melts too easily |
| V | 34 °C (93 °F) | Glossy, firm, best snap, melts near body temperature (37 °C) |
| VI | 36 °C (97 °F) | Hard, takes weeks to form |

== See also ==
- Conching – Process for refining chocolate by stirring at high temperature

== Sources ==
- Afoakwa, Emmanuel Ohene (April 8, 2016). Chocolate Science and Technology. Wiley. doi:10.1002/9781118913758. ISBN 9781118913789.
- Afoakwa, Emmanuel Ohene; Paterson, Alistair; Fowler, Mark; Vieira, Joselio (2008). "Effects of tempering and fat crystallisation behaviour on microstructure, mechanical properties and appearance in dark chocolate systems". Journal of Food Engineering. 89 (2): 128–136. doi:10.1016/j.jfoodeng.2008.04.021.
- Beckett, Stephen T (2019). The Science of Chocolate (3rd ed.). Croydon, United Kingdom: Royal Society of Chemistry. doi:10.1039/9781839168437. ISBN 9781788012355.
- Fryer, Peter; Pinschower, Kerstin (2000). "The Materials Science of Chocolate". MRS Bulletin. 25 (12): 25–29. Bibcode:2000MRSBu..25...25F. doi:10.1557/mrs2000.250.
- Hendrik, Nathaniel J; Marchesini, Flávio H; Van de Walle, Davy; Dewettinck, Koen (August 3, 2023). "Chocolate Tempering in a Rheometer: Monitoring Rheological Properties During and After Crystallization of Cocoa Butter". Food Analytical Methods. 16 (9–10): 1555–1570. doi:10.1007/s12161-023-02522-4.
- Loisel, C; Keller, G; Lecq, G; Bourgaux, C; Ollivon, M (1998). "Phase Transitions and Polymorphism of Cocoa Butter". Journal of the American Oil Chemists' Society. 75 (4): 425–439. doi:10.1007/s11746-998-0245-y.
- Pirouzian, Haniyeh Rasouli; Konar, Nevzat; Palabiyik, Ibrahim; Oba, Sirin; Toker, Omer Said (2020). "Pre-crystallization process in chocolate: Mechanism, importance and novel aspects". Food Chemistry. 321 126718. doi:10.1016/j.foodchem.2020.126718. PMID 32251925.
- Poelmans, Eline; Swinnen, Johan (2016). "A Brief Economic History of Chocolate". In Squicciarini, Mara P; Swinnen, Johan (eds.). The Economics of Chocolate. Oxford University Press. ISBN 9780191793264.
- Snyder, Rodney; Olsen, Bradley Foliart; Brindle, Laura Pallas (2009). "From Stone Metates to Steel Mills". In Grivetti, Louis Evan; Shapiro, Howard-Yana (eds.). Chocolate: History, Culture, and Heritage. Hoboken, New Jersey: Wiley. doi:10.1002/9780470411315.ch46. ISBN 9780470121658.
