= Indrawati Oey =

Researcher at University of Otago (born 1970)

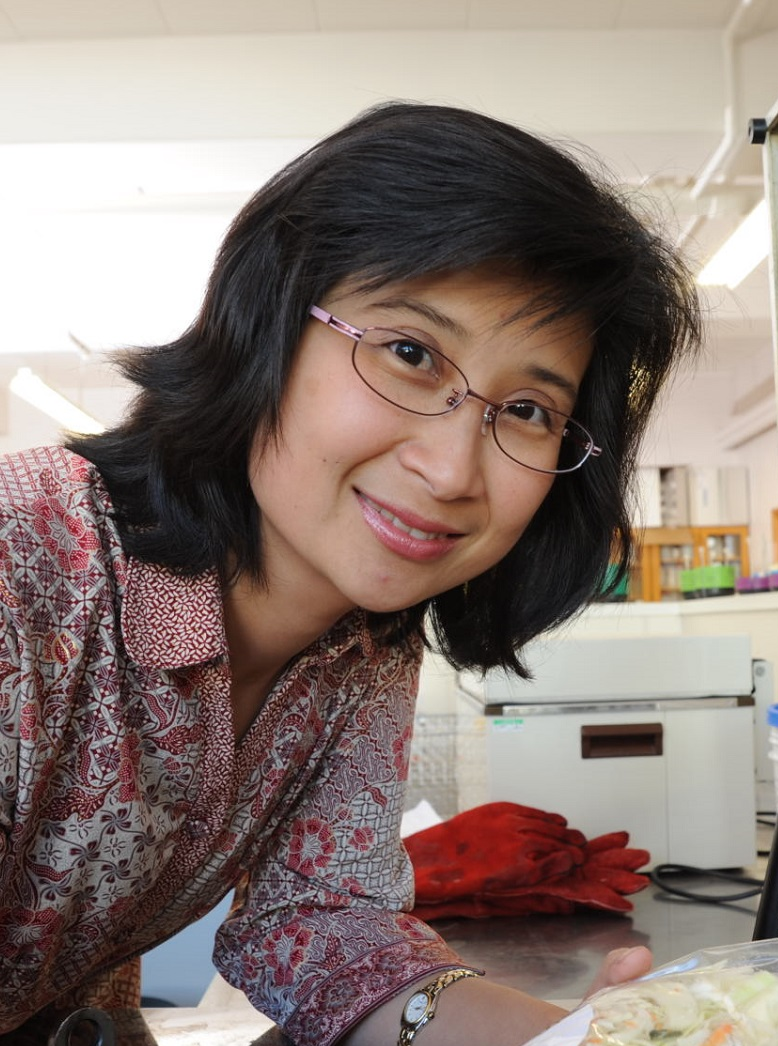
- Oey in 2010
- Born: 29 April 1970 (age 56); Malang, East Java, Indonesia
- Education: Katholieke Universiteit Leuven
- Scientific career
- Fields: Food Science
- Workplaces: Katholieke Universiteit Leuven, University of Otago
- Thesis: Lipoxygenase inactivation by high pressure treatment at subzero and elevated temperatures: a kinetic study (2000)

Indrawati Oey (born 29 April 1970) is a New Zealand food scientist, full professor at the University of Otago.

== Early life and education ==
Oey was born in Malang, East Java, Indonesia in 1970.

== Academic career ==
After a PhD at Katholieke Universiteit Leuven, Oey moved to the University of Otago and rose to full professor and head of the Department of Food Sciences. She is a principal investigator of the Riddet Institute, a national food research centre in New Zealand.

Her work has focused on the biochemical reactions that affect multiple aspects of food quality, including texture, flavour, colour, and nutrition. At Otago, she has led a project on applications of pulsed electric field equipment to improve food quality and efficiency of processing. She has also worked on edible food packaging to tackle problems of current plastic packaging.

== Honours and awards ==
In 2016 Oey was elected a Fellow of the New Zealand Institute of Food Science and Technology.

== Selected works ==
- Oey, Indrawati, Martina Lille, Ann Van Loey, and Marc Hendrickx. "Effect of high-pressure processing on colour, texture and flavour of fruit-and vegetable-based food products: a review." Trends in Food Science & Technology 19, no. 6 (2008): 320–328.
- Oey, Indrawati, Iesel Van der Plancken, Ann Van Loey, and Marc Hendrickx. "Does high pressure processing influence nutritional aspects of plant based food systems?." Trends in Food Science & Technology 19, no. 6 (2008): 300–308.
- Leong, Sze Ying, and Indrawati Oey. "Effects of processing on anthocyanins, carotenoids and vitamin C in summer fruits and vegetables." Food Chemistry 133, no. 4 (2012): 1577–1587.
- Verbeyst, Lise, Indrawati Oey, Iesel Van der Plancken, Marc Hendrickx, and Ann Van Loey. "Kinetic study on the thermal and pressure degradation of anthocyanins in strawberries." Food Chemistry 123, no. 2 (2010): 269–274.
- Van Loey, Ann, V. Ooms, C. Weemaes, Ilse Van den Broeck, Linda Ludikhuyze, Indrawati, S. Denys, and M. Hendrickx. "Thermal and Pressure− Temperature Degradation of Chlorophyll in Broccoli (Brassica oleracea L. italica) Juice: A Kinetic Study." Journal of Agricultural and Food Chemistry 46, no. 12 (1998): 5289–5294.
