= Marie Wong =

Food technologist at Massey University

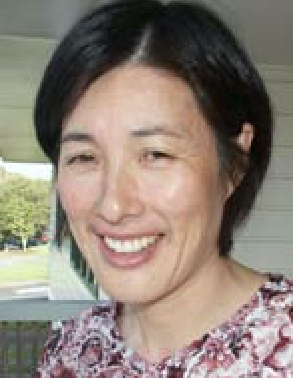
- Wong in 2007
- Education: Massey University
- Awards: Fellow of the New Zealand Institute of Food Science and Technology (2007); JC Andrews Award (2019)
- Scientific career
- Fields: Food technology
- Workplaces: HortResearch; Massey University
- Thesis: Modelling of a Direct Osmotic Concentration Membrane System. (1997)
- Doctoral advisors: Ray Winger; Robert McKibbin; Ronald Wrolstad

Marie Wong is a New Zealand academic food technologist, and as of 2020 is a full professor at Massey University.

== Academic career ==
Wong completed a PhD titled Modelling of a Direct Osmotic Concentration Membrane System at Massey University in 1998, supervised by Professors Ray Winger, Robert McKibbin and Ronald Wrolstad. Wong then moved to HortResearch, and subsequently back to Massey University, rising to full professor in 2020.

Wong partnered with New Zealand company Heilala Vanilla to develop a high-value product based on their Tongan-grown vanilla beans. The partnership was a finalist in the KiwiNet 2014 awards. Wong has researched features of avocado oil, such as its smoking point and extraction techniques. Wong is part of Massey University's Beverage Lab, a collaboration between sports scientists, food professionals and health researchers which aims to research and develop performance-enhancing beverages.

== Awards and honours ==
Wong was made a fellow of the New Zealand Institute of Food Science and Technology in 2007. In 2019, she won the institute's JC Andrews Award.

== Selected works ==
- Olivia Kitson; Kay Rutherfurd-Markwick; Andrew Foskett; Jason Kai Wei Lee; Charles Diako; Marie Wong; Ajmol Ali (23 September 2021). "Sensory Perception of an Oral Rehydration Solution during Exercise in the Heat". Nutrients. 13 (10): 3313. doi:10.3390/nu13103313. ISSN 2072-6643. PMC 8537885. PMID 34684314. Wikidata Q123177737.
- Emily Margaret Jakubcik; Kay Rutherfurd-Markwick; Marsanne Chabert; Marie Wong; Ajmol Ali (20 January 2021). "Pharmacokinetics of Nitrate and Nitrite Following Beetroot Juice Drink Consumption". Nutrients. 13 (2): 281. doi:10.3390/nu13020281. ISSN 2072-6643. PMC 7908977. PMID 33498220. Wikidata Q123177738.
- Danxia Shi; Wenliang Xu; Marie Wong; David G. Popovich (18 April 2023). "An Improved Purification Method for Removing Colour Interference from 3-(4,5-Dimethylthiazol-2-yl)-2,5-diphenyl Tetrazolium Bromide (MTT) Antibacterial Assays". Applied Sciences. 13 (8): 5067. doi:10.3390/app13085067. ISSN 2076-3417. Wikidata Q123177739.
- Shuang Zhao; H. Eustina Oh; Marie Wong (May 2023). "Physicochemical and rheological properties of skim milk with different added zinc salts". International Dairy Journal. 140 105584. doi:10.1016/j.idairyj.2023.105584. ISSN 0958-6946. Wikidata Q123177740.
- Sophie Turner; Charles Diako; Rozanne Kruger; Marie Wong; Warrick Wood; Kay Rutherfurd-Markwick; Eric Stice; Ajmol Ali (12 December 2022). "The Effect of a 14-Day Intervention to Reduce Sugar Cravings in Adults". Nutrients. 14 (24): 5287. doi:10.3390/nu14245287. ISSN 2072-6643. PMC 9788288. PMID 36558446. Wikidata Q123177743.
- Shuo Yang; Ian Hallett; Hyunah Eustina Oh; Allan B. Woolf; Marie Wong (20 October 2021). "Effect of malaxing time and temperature on rheological properties of 'Hass' avocado pulp and oil yield during oil extraction". Journal of the American Oil Chemists' Society. 98 (12): 1205–1214. doi:10.1002/aocs.12549. ISSN 0003-021X. Wikidata Q123177744.
