= New Zealand Institute of Food Science and Technology =

Professional society in New Zealand

- Abbreviation: NZIFST
- Formation: 1964
- Headquarters: Auckland
- Website: https://nzifst.org.nz/

The New Zealand Institute of Food Science and Technology (NZIFST) is a professional society for food scientists and technologists in industry and academia in New Zealand.

== History ==
Kelvin Scott was the inaugural professor of food technology at Massey University, and proposed the establishment of a professional association at the first New Zealand Food Technology Conference in 1964. The society was established in 1964, with branches in Auckland, Hawke's Bay and Wellington, before the first South Island branch followed in 1969, in Christchurch. Scott was the first president of the institute, with Garth Wallace as secretary and treasurer. Scott was made a fellow of the institute in 1967.

The society's aims are to "provide a meeting ground for persons who are associated with the food industry in any way to enable them to discuss common problems".

The first enrolled member of the society was John Clark Andrews (1903–1966), a New Zealand food scientist, chemist and chancellor of Massey University. Andrews has been described as "one of the founders of food science as a profession in New Zealand", and the society's most prestigious award is the annual J. C. Andrews Award, given in his honour. In 1986, the award was won by the institute's first president, Kelvin Scott. In 2023, the award was won by John Brookes, who established biofilm research at Massey.

== Activities ==
The society publishes the magazine Food New Zealand six times per year. It holds an annual conference, and awards fellowships, honorary fellowships and prizes. The most prestigious award given is the J. C. Andrews Award, but the society gives a number of other named awards, such as the Kelvin Scott Memorial Prize, the Mary D. Earle Award for mid-career members, and the Ron Hooker Award for Exemplary Service.

== Fellows ==
Notable fellows of the New Zealand Institute of Food Science and Technology include:

- Charles Brennan – Food science professor
- Mary Earle – New Zealand food technologist (1929–2021) (fellow and honorary fellow)
- Lynnette Ferguson – New Zealand research scientist and geneticist
- Nazimah Hamid – New Zealand food scientist
- Dick Hubbard – New Zealand businessman and politician
- Miranda Mirosa - Professor of food science at University of Otago
- Indrawati Oey – Researcher at University of Otago (born 1970)
- Siew-Young Quek – Professor of chemical sciences in New Zealand
- Brian Shorland – New Zealand organic chemist (1909–1999) (honorary fellow)
- Janis Swan – New Zealand food process engineering academic
- Marie Wong – Food technologist at Massey University (and 2019 winner of the J. C. Andrews Award)
