= Mary Earle =

New Zealand food technologist (1929–2021)

Mary Earle OBE
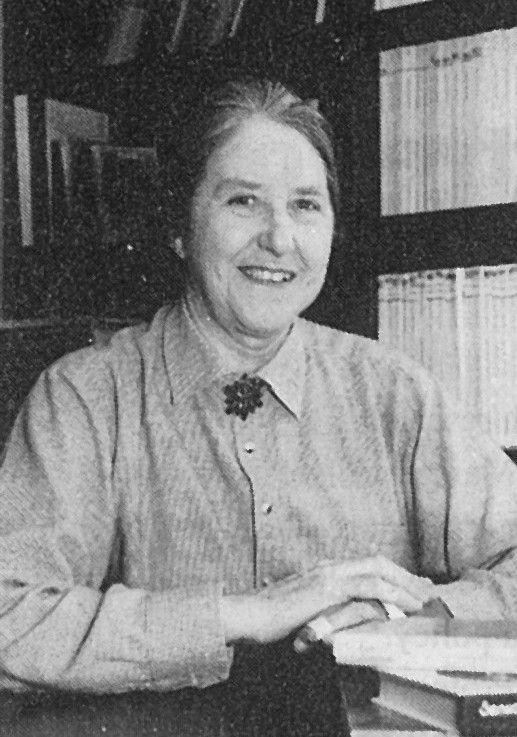
- Earle in 1992
- Born: Mary Davidson Cameron; 20 October 1929; Banavie, Inverness-shire, Scotland
- Died: 18 April 2021 (aged 91); Palmerston North, New Zealand
- Education: University of Glasgow
- Spouse: Dick Earle (m. 1961)
- Scientific career
- Fields: Food technology
- Workplaces: MIRINZ; Massey University
- Thesis: The purification of soya lipoxidase (1957)

Mary Davidson Earle OBE (née Cameron; 20 October 1929 – 18 April 2021) was a Scottish-born New Zealand food technologist. She was the first female faculty member of a university engineering department in New Zealand when she joined Massey University's food technology department in 1965.

== Early life ==
Earle was born Mary Davidson Cameron on 20 October 1929 in Banavie near Ben Nevis in Scotland, the daughter of Ronald Cameron. She studied chemical engineering at the University of Glasgow, and completed her PhD in food science there in 1957. The title of her doctoral thesis was The purification of soya lipoxidase. She then worked in product development in the British food industry for five years.

While studying at Glasgow, she met her husband, Richard Lawrence Earle, who was also undertaking doctoral studies there, and the couple married in 1961.

== Career in New Zealand ==
After moving to New Zealand in 1961, Mary Earle began work at New Zealand's Meat Industry Research Institute. She joined the staff of Massey University Food Technology Department in 1965, becoming the first female engineering academic in New Zealand. Her early work was adding rigour to the university's graduate course in food technology, which had been established the year before she joined Massey. In time she would develop the Food Technology Research Centre, which made the university's resources available to industry.

In 1992, Earle became a full professor when she was awarded a personal chair by Massey University, the first in the university's technology faculty. She was the fourth female professor at Massey. She retired from Massey in 1994, and was accorded the title of professor emerita.

Earle served on the board of the New Zealand Institute for Crop and Food Research, and was a director of the Pork Industry Board.

== Later life and death ==
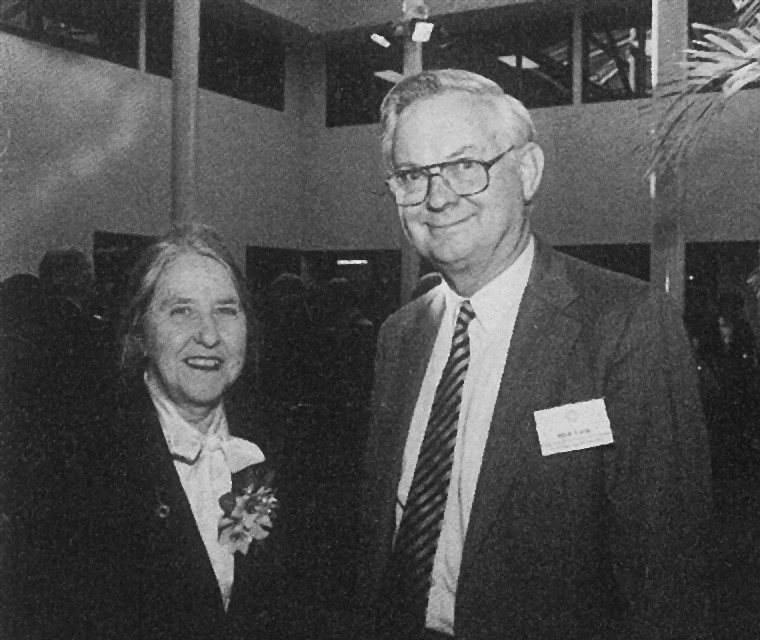
Mary and Dick Earle in 1995

In retirement, Mary and Dick Earle wrote eight books together, including Creating New Foods: The Product Developer's Guide in 2009. They established scholarship and grant programmes to support students, particularly women, in engineering and technology, and founded the Earle Creativity and Development Trust to develop and nurture science and technology, the visual and fine arts, literature and history, and music in the Manawatū and Rangitīkei regions.

Mary Earle died in Palmerston North on 18 April 2021, and she chose to be buried in Turakina where some of the earliest Scottish immigrants to New Zealand had lived. She had been a president of the Clan Cameron Association of New Zealand whose members celebrate their Scottish roots.

== Honours and awards ==
In 1973 Earle was elected a Fellow of the New Zealand Institute of Food Science and Technology, and then an Honorary Fellow in 1994. In 1992, Earle was elected an honorary fellow of the New Zealand Institution of Engineers. In the 1993 Queen's Birthday Honours, she was appointed an Officer of the Order of the British Empire, for services to food technology, and the same year she was one of 544 recipients of the New Zealand Suffrage Centennial Medal.

In 2018, Earle was conferred with an honorary Doctor of Science degree by Massey University. She also received an honorary doctorate from Khon Kaen University in Thailand, and was an honorary fellow of the Institute of Food Science & Technology.
