= Charles Brennan =

Food science professor

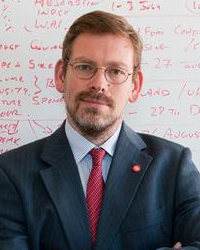
- Brennan in 2013
- Born: Charles Stephen Brennan; July 1967 (age 58)
- Occupation: Food scientist
- Spouse: Margaret Brennan
- Children: 4

Charles Stephen Brennan is a professor of food science at RMIT University where he is the dean of the School of Science. He previously worked at Lincoln University as a member of the Faculty of Agriculture and Life Sciences.

Brennan's research interests lie in the interface between food science and human nutrition with a particular interest in how bio-active ingredients and processing manipulate the nutritional quality of foods, in particular, the role of plant dietary fibre in manipulating the glycaemic response.

Brennan is a graduate of London University, Wye College (BSc in applied plant science) and King's College London (PhD in food science and nutrition). During his career, he has also worked at Durham University, Plymouth University, Massey University, and Manchester Metropolitan University.

He currently serves as editor-in-chief for the journal International Journal of Molecular Sciences, and the International Journal of Food Science & Technology and on the editorial board of the Journal of Bioactive Carbohydrates and Dietary Fibre.

== Honours and awards ==
In 2015 Brennan was elected a Fellow of the New Zealand Institute of Food Science and Technology.

In 2020 he was awarded Honorary Fellowship of the UK Institute of Food Science and Technology, in recognition of "an extensive personal contribution to the working and progress of the Institute and to the food science and technology profession".
