= Lynnette Ferguson =

New Zealand research scientist and geneticist

Lynnette Ferguson QSO
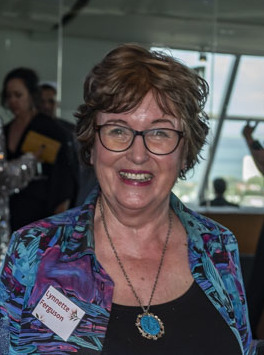
- Ferguson in 2020
- Born: Lynnette Robin Ferguson
- Education: University of Oxford
- Scientific career
- Fields: Nutritional genomics
- Workplaces: University of Auckland
- Thesis: The control of DNA repair in yeast (1975)

Lynnette Robin Ferguson QSO is a New Zealand academic, and as of 2021 is an emeritus professor at the University of Auckland. Ferguson has been a Fellow of the Royal Society Te Apārangi since 2016.

== Academic career ==
Ferguson says she initially wanted to be a hairdresser, until a stint at hairdressing school showed her she did not have the talent or interest for it.

After completing a Masters of Science with Honours at the University of Auckland, Ferguson completed a DPhil at the Department of Plant Sciences, University of Oxford, in 1975, with a thesis titled The Control of DNA Repair in Yeast. She returned to the University of Auckland School of Medicine for post-doctoral work, and then became an Auckland Cancer Society research career fellow.

Ferguson was promoted to full professor at the University of Auckland in 2000, when she established a new Department of Nutrition. She is now a emeritus professor at the University of Auckland.

Ferguson works on nutritional genomics, mutagenesis and the causes and control of chronic diseases such as inflammatory bowel disease. She has also worked on genes associated with satiety, the feeling of fullness after eating.

For ten years, Ferguson led Nutrigenomics New Zealand, which was a partnership between the University of Auckland, and three Crown Research Institutes: Crop & Food Research, AgResearch and HortResearch. Research focused on the genetics of inflammatory bowel disease and how personalised dietary changes could influence disease. This led to the first international conference on nutrigenomics and gut health, in 2006.

== Honours and awards ==
In the 2006 Queen's Birthday Honours, Ferguson was appointed a Companion of the Queen's Service Order for public services.

Ferguson was elected a Fellow of the Royal Society Te Apārangi in 2016. She is also a Fellow of the New Zealand Institute of Food Science and Technology.

== Selected works ==
- Luke Jostins; Stephan Ripke; Rinse K Weersma; et al. (1 November 2012). "Host-microbe interactions have shaped the genetic architecture of inflammatory bowel disease". Nature. 491 (7422): 119–24. doi:10.1038/nature11582. ISSN 1476-4687. PMC 3491803. PMID 23128233. Wikidata Q22251082.
- Ferguson LR (1 April 2001). "Role of plant polyphenols in genomic stability". Mutation Research. 475 (1–2): 89–111. doi:10.1016/s0027-5107(01)00073-2. ISSN 1383-5718. PMID 11295156. Wikidata Q34213985.
- Isabelle Cleynen; Gabrielle Boucher; Luke Jostins; et al. (16 October 2015). "Inherited determinants of Crohn's disease and ulcerative colitis phenotypes: a genetic association study". The Lancet. 387 (10014): 156–167. doi:10.1016/s0140-6736(15)00465-1. ISSN 0140-6736. PMC 4714968. PMID 26490195. Wikidata Q36468290.
- Silvio De Flora; Lynnette R Ferguson (16 August 2005). "Overview of mechanisms of cancer chemopreventive agents". Mutation Research. 591 (1–2): 8–15. doi:10.1016/j.mrfmmm.2005.02.029. ISSN 1383-5718. PMID 16107270. Wikidata Q36233609.
- Lynnette R. Ferguson (February 2010). "Meat and cancer". Meat Science. 84 (2): 308–313. doi:10.1016/j.meatsci.2009.06.032. ISSN 0309-1740. PMID 20374790. Wikidata Q22252367.
- Ferguson LR (1 May 1994). "Antimutagens as cancer chemopreventive agents in the diet". Mutation Research. 307 (1): 395–410. doi:10.1016/0027-5107(94)90313-1. ISSN 1383-5718. PMID 7513820. Wikidata Q40388689.
