= European Federation of Food Science and Technology =

The European Federation of Food Science and Technology (EFFoST) is a European-based non-governmental organization devoted to the advancement of food science and technology. It consists of eighty different societies in 21 different European countries. They are a regional group of the International Union of Food Science and Technology.

== EFFoST's roles ==
1. Increase closer contacts among the academic, government, and industrial areas in food.
2. Enhance rapid technology transfer to increase economic competitiveness in Europe.
3. Promote continuing education within food science and technology.
4. Standardize food law and its enforcement throughout Europe.
5. Maintain collaborative relationships within the European food industry on Knowledge sharing.

=== Publications ===
- Innovative Food Science and Emerging Technologies (ISFET), the official scientific journal of EFFoST.
- Trends in Food Science and Technology (TIFS), a mini peer-review scientific journal that is more involved in product development than basic research.
- Food Processing Intelligence (FPI), the official EFFoST book published twice a year on the status of the food industry in Europe.
- Position papers on various issues in European food science and technology.

== Executive committee ==
The executive committee consists of a President, Past President, President-Elect, four other elected officials, and twelve Members-At-Large.

== Headquarters ==
EFFoST is headquartered in Wageningen, Netherlands.
