= Innovative Food Science and Emerging Technologies =

- Discipline: Food studies
- Language: English
- Edited by: M. Hendrickx, D. Knorr

Publication details
- History: 2000-present
- Publisher: Elsevier
- Frequency: Quarterly
- Impact factor: 3.030 (2011)

Standard abbreviations
- ISO 4: Innov. Food Sci. Emerg. Technol.

Indexing
- CODEN: IFSEBO
- ISSN: 1466-8564 (print); 1878-5522 (web)
- LCCN: 2001200273
- OCLC no.: 610588124

Links
- Journal homepage; Online access

Innovative Food Science and Emerging Technologies is a quarterly peer-reviewed scientific journal covering basic and applied research in food science and technology. It is an official journal of the European Federation of Food Science and Technology. As of 2007, its editors-in-chief are Dietrich Knorr (Technische Universität Berlin) and Marc C. Hendrickx (Katholieke Universiteit Leuven). According to the Journal Citation Reports, the journal has a 2011 impact factor of 3.030.
