= Nazimah Hamid =

New Zealand food scientist

- Education: University of Strathclyde
- Scientific career
- Fields: Food science
- Workplaces: Auckland University of Technology
- Thesis: Relationships between aroma quality in juices from two frozen Scottish raspberries and thermal and enzymic treatments in processing (1996)

Nazimah Hamid is a New Zealand food science academic, and as of 2017 is a full professor at the Auckland University of Technology.

== Academic career ==
After a 1996 PhD titled 'Relationships between aroma quality in juices from two frozen Scottish raspberries and thermal and enzymic treatments in processing' at the University of Strathclyde, Hamid moved to the Auckland University of Technology, rising to full professor.

== Honours and awards ==
In 2017 Hamid was elected a Fellow of the New Zealand Institute of Food Science and Technology.

== Selected works ==
- Mirhosseini, Hamed, Chin Ping Tan, Nazimah SA Hamid, and Salmah Yusof. "Effect of Arabic gum, xanthan gum and orange oil contents on ζ-potential, conductivity, stability, size index and pH of orange beverage emulsion." Colloids and Surfaces A: Physicochemical and Engineering Aspects 315, no. 1-3 (2008): 47–56.
- Mirhosseini, Hamed, Chin Ping Tan, Nazimah SA Hamid, and Salmah Yusof. "Optimization of the contents of Arabic gum, xanthan gum and orange oil affecting turbidity, average particle size, polydispersity index and density in orange beverage emulsion." Food Hydrocolloids 22, no. 7 (2008): 1212–1223.
- Heenan, Samuel P., Jean-Pierre Dufour, Nazimah Hamid, Winna Harvey, and Conor M. Delahunty. "The sensory quality of fresh bread: Descriptive attributes and consumer perceptions." Food research international 41, no. 10 (2008): 989–997.
- Fung, Adah, Nazimah Hamid, and Jun Lu. "Fucoxanthin content and antioxidant properties of Undaria pinnatifida." Food chemistry 136, no. 2 (2013): 1055–1062.
