= Chocolate bloom =

Coating that can appear on chocolate

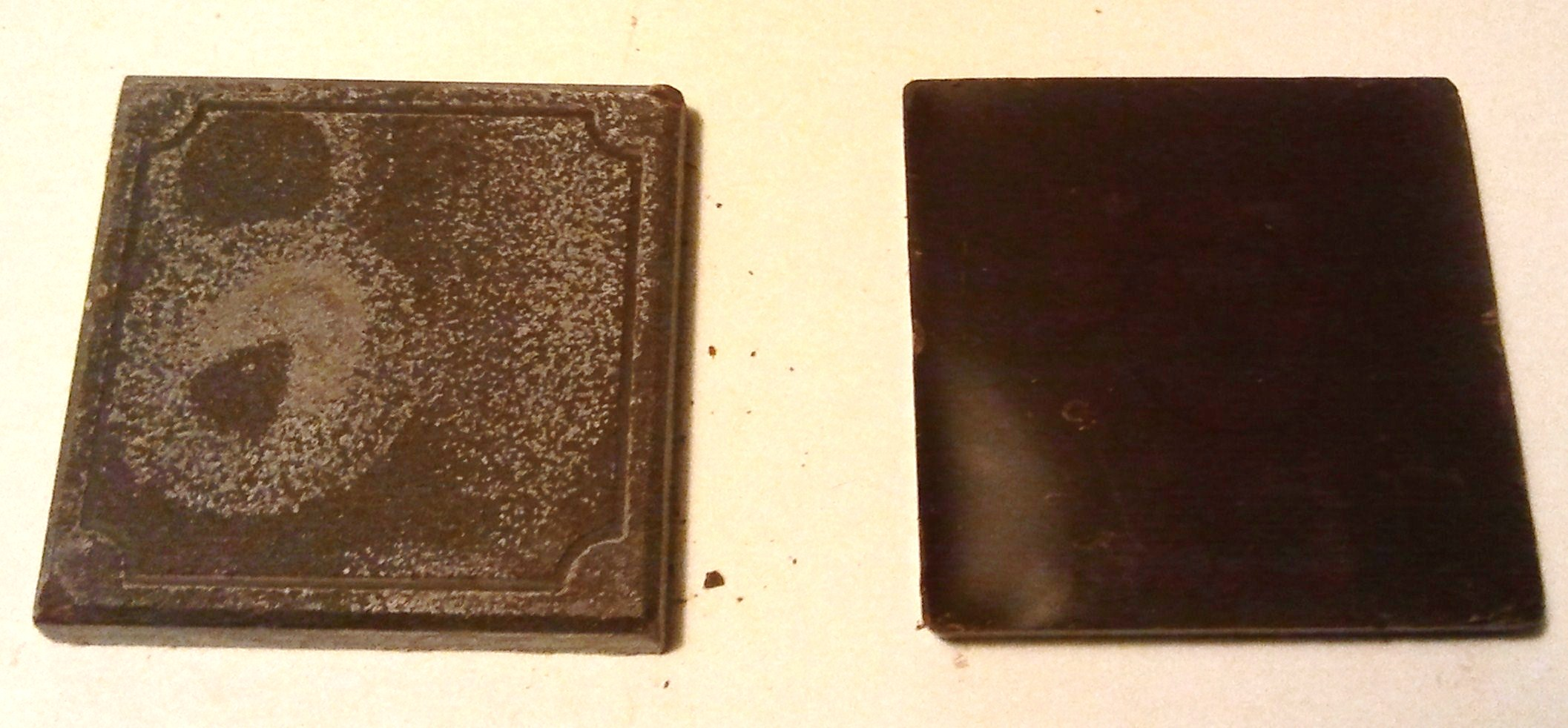
Comparison of blooming (left) and regular chocolate bars

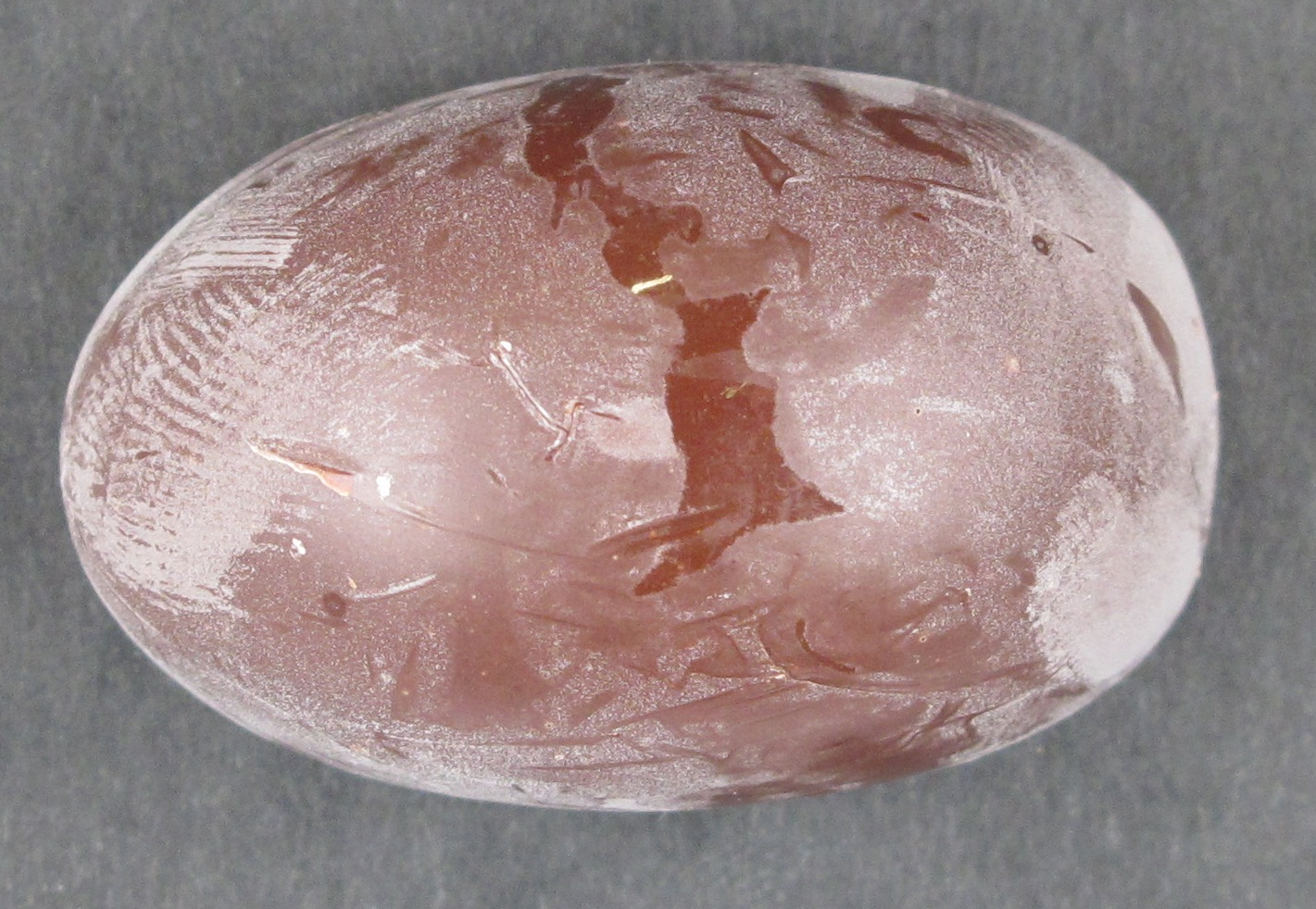
Fat bloom on the surface of chocolate with a marzipan filling

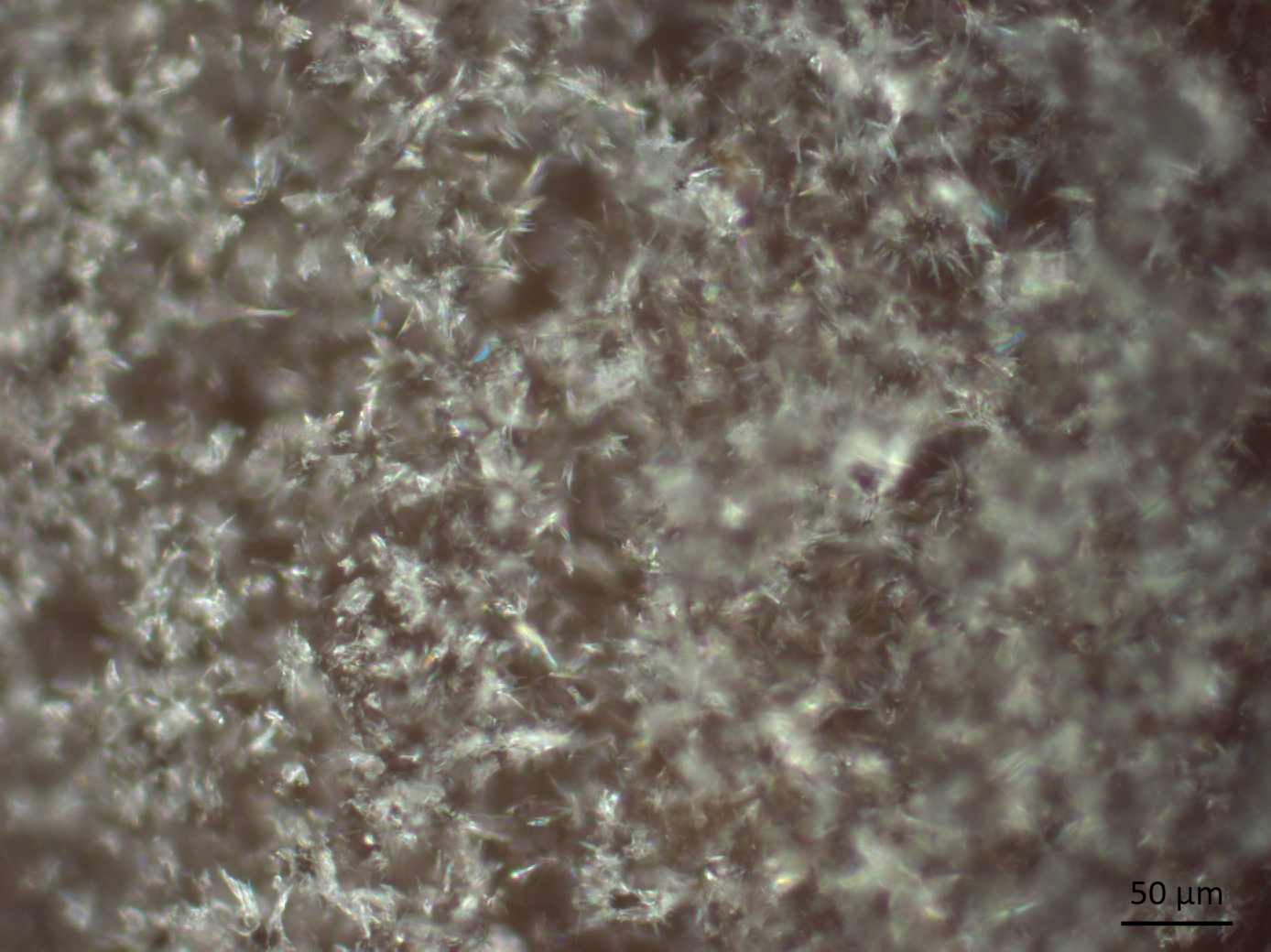
Fat bloom viewed under an optical microscope

Chocolate bloom is either of two types of whitish coating that can appear on the surface of chocolate: fat bloom, caused by changes in the fat crystals in the chocolate; and sugar bloom, due to crystals formed by the action of moisture on the sugar. Fat and sugar bloom damage the appearance of chocolate but do not limit its shelf life. Chocolate that has "bloomed" is still safe to eat (as it is a non-perishable food due to its sugar content), but may have an unappetizing appearance and surface texture. Chocolate bloom can be repaired by melting the chocolate down, stirring it, then pouring it into a mould and allowing it to cool and re-solidify, bringing the sugar or fat back into the solution.

== Fat bloom ==
Fat bloom is the result of gradual separation of the cocoa butter and the dissolved components of the chocolate mixture. Generally bloom arises due to storage or age. Improper formulation exacerbates the problem. The fats in cocoa butter are a mixture of triglycerides with varying melting points: those with lower melt temperatures are more mobile than other constituents and migrate to the surface of the chocolate.

Cocoa butter can be classified into polymorphic forms. Bloomed chocolates contain the most stable VI polymorph of cocoa butter. Bloom occurs through the uncontrolled polymorphic transformation of cocoa butter from a less stable form (form IV or V) to the most stable form (form VI). The technology of good chocolate production depends on ensuring that only the stable form of the cocoa butter ingredient exists in the final product. In poorly tempered chocolate, form IV will transform to V and eventually form VI, resulting in bloom, while in well-tempered chocolate, form V will transform to form VI and bloom may also occur. Elevated and/or fluctuating temperatures increase the transformation rate and thus promote bloom formation. However, it is found that the production of form VI from form V does not always lead to bloom; a direct relationship cannot be established between fat bloom and the evolution of the crystalline forms. The onset of transformation from form V to form VI crystals is not the cause of visual bloom; rather, this transition should be considered as an aspect of cocoa butter recrystallization that may result in bloom.

== Sugar bloom ==
While the most common is fat bloom, sugar bloom also occurs and is not necessarily distinguishable from fat bloom by appearance. In freshly sugar bloomed samples, it is often easy to feel the surface difference; sugar bloom feels dry and does not melt to the touch, while fat bloom feels slick and melts. One can often distinguish the two types by touching a small droplet of water to the surface. With fat bloom, the droplet beads up (as fats and oils are hydrophobic—they and water mutually repel). With sugar bloom, the droplet quickly flattens and spreads, as the water dissolves the microscopic sugar particles on the surface. Alternatively, gentle warming of the surface (with a hairdryer, for example) will cause the crystals of fat bloom to melt, removing the appearance of bloom, while leaving sugar bloom unchanged.

Sugar bloom is caused by moisture. Condensation on to the surface of the chocolate or moisture in the chocolate coating causes the sugar to absorb the moisture and dissolve. When the moisture evaporates, the sugar forms larger crystals, leaving a dusty layer. It is caused by:

- Storage of chocolates in damp conditions
- Deposit of "dew" during manufacture from damp, cooler air or allowing chocolates to enter a packing room at a temperature below the dew point of that room
- Use of hygroscopic ingredients (low grade or brown sugars)
- High-temperature storage conditions of chocolate-covered confectionery, where the centers have a high relative humidity and the water vapor given off is trapped in the wrappings

Sugar bloom can be reduced by maintaining an appropriate storage temperature for chocolate products. A psychrometric chart can be used to determine the temperature above which food must be maintained in order to avoid condensation.
