= Trends in Food Science and Technology =

Monthly peer-reviewed journal on food science

- Discipline: Food science
- Language: English
- Edited by: Paul Finglas

Publication details
- History: 1990–present
- Publisher: Elsevier
- Frequency: Monthly
- Open access: Hybrid
- Impact factor: 12.563 (2021)

Standard abbreviations
- ISO 4: Trends Food Sci. Technol.

Indexing
- CODEN: TFTEEH
- ISSN: 0924-2244
- LCCN: 90650067
- OCLC no.: 644555814

Links
- Journal homepage; Online access; Online archive

Trends in Food Science and Technology (TIFS) is a monthly peer-reviewed review journal covering food science and technology. It is an official publication of the European Federation of Food Science and Technology and of the International Union of Food Science and Technology. The editors-in-chief are Rickey Yada and Fidel Todra (Institute of Food Research).

== Abstracting an indexing ==
The journal is abstracted and indexed in:

- BIOSIS Previews
- CAB Abstracts
- Current Contents/Agriculture, Biology & Environmental Sciences
- Dairy Science Abstracts
- Elsevier Biobase
- EMBiology
- Food Science and Technology Abstracts
- Science Citation Index
- Scopus

According to the Journal Citation Reports, the journal has a 2021 impact factor of 12.563.
