= European Journal of Pharmaceutics and Biopharmaceutics =

- Discipline: Pharmaceutics
- Language: English
- Edited by: R. Gurny

Publication details
- History: 1997-present
- Publisher: Elsevier
- Frequency: 9/year
- Open access: Hybrid
- Impact factor: 5.571 (2020)

Standard abbreviations
- ISO 4: Eur. J. Pharm. Biopharm.

Indexing
- ISSN: 0939-6411 (print); 1873-3441 (web)
- OCLC no.: 24147951

Links
- Journal homepage; Online access

The European Journal of Pharmaceutics and Biopharmaceutics is a peer-reviewed medical journal and the official journal of the International Association for Pharmaceutical Technology. It publishes research on pharmaceutical technology, pharmaceutical biotechnology, and biopharmaceutics.

== Abstracting and indexing ==
The journal is abstracted and indexed in BIOSIS Previews, CAB Abstracts, Chemical Abstracts, EMBASE, International Pharmaceutical Abstracts, MEDLINE, PASCAL, Science Citation Index, and Scopus.
