= Appetite (journal) =

- Discipline: Ingestive behaviors, Human nutrition, Home economics
- Language: English

Publication details
- History: 1980–present
- Publisher: Elsevier
- Frequency: Monthly
- Open access: Hybrid
- Impact factor: 5.016 (2021)

Standard abbreviations
- ISO 4: Appetite

Indexing
- CODEN: APPTD4
- ISSN: 0195-6663 (print); 1095-8304 (web)
- LCCN: 83646052
- OCLC no.: 1016394168

Links
- Journal homepage; Online access; Online archive

Appetite is a monthly peer-reviewed scientific journal covering research on normal and disordered eating and drinking in animals and humans. The journal was established in 1980. It is published by Elsevier and the editor-in-chief is Professor Marion M Hetherington.

== Abstracting and indexing ==
The journal is abstracted and indexed in:

- Biological Abstracts
- BIOSIS Previews
- CAB Abstracts
- Chemical Abstracts Service
- CINAHL
- Current Contents/Life Sciences
- EBSCO databases
- Embase
- Food Science and Technology Abstracts
- Index Medicus/MEDLINE/PubMed
- PsycINFO
- Science Citation Index
- Scopus

According to the Journal Citation Reports, the journal has a 2021 impact factor of 5.016.
