= Journal of Agricultural and Food Chemistry =

- Discipline: Applied chemistry, food science
- Language: English
- Edited by: Thomas F. Hofmann

Publication details
- History: 1953–present
- Publisher: American Chemical Society (United States)
- Frequency: Weekly
- Impact factor: 6.2 (2022)

Standard abbreviations
- ISO 4: J. Agric. Food Chem.

Indexing
- CODEN: JAFCAU
- ISSN: 0021-8561 (print); 1520-5118 (web)

Links
- Journal homepage; Online access; Online archive

The Journal of Agricultural and Food Chemistry is a weekly peer-reviewed scientific journal established in 1953 by the American Chemical Society. Since 2015, Thomas Hofmann (Technical University of Munich) has been the editor-in-chief.

The journal covers research dealing with the chemistry and biochemistry of agriculture and food including work with chemistry and/or biochemistry as a major component combined with biological/sensory/nutritional/toxicological evaluation related to agriculture and/or food.

== Abstracting and indexing ==
The journal is abstracted and indexed in Chemical Abstracts Service, Scopus, ProQuest, PubMed, CABI, and the Science Citation Index Expanded. According to the Journal Citation Reports, the Journal of Agricultural and Food Chemistry has a 2015 impact factor of 4.192.
