= Food Chemistry (journal) =

- Discipline: Food chemistry
- Language: English
- Edited by: Paul Finglas

Publication details
- History: 1976–present
- Publisher: Elsevier
- Frequency: 24/year
- Impact factor: 7.514 (2020)

Standard abbreviations
- ISO 4: Food Chem.

Indexing
- CODEN: FOCHD
- ISSN: 0308-8146
- OCLC no.: 2728297

Links
- Journal homepage

Food Chemistry (abbreviated Food Chem.) is a peer-reviewed scientific journal covering research in food chemistry. It was established in 1976 and is published monthly by Elsevier.
