= Nagahama =

Nagahama may refer to:

== People ==
- Nagahama (surname)

== Places ==
- Nagahama, Ehime, a former town in Kita District, Ehime, Japan; now part of Ōzu
- Nagahama, Shiga, a city in Shiga Prefecture, Japan
  - Nagahama Castle, a hirashiro (castle on a plain) in Nagahama, Shiga
  - Nagahama Station, a train station on the Hokuriku Main Line, Nagahama, Shiga
- Nagahama Hall, a concert hall, in Hideyo Noguchi Memorial Park, Yokohama, Japan

== Other uses ==
- 6655 Nagahama, a main-belt asteroid
- Nagahama (moth), a moth genus of the family Crambidae
