= Atsuko Seta =

Japanese pianist (born 1955)

- 瀬田 敦子
- Atsuko Seta in 2019
- Born: March 4, 1955 (age 71); Osaka, Japan
- Occupations: Concert pianist, Honorary Professor at Music Department, Payap University

Atsuko Seta (瀬田 敦子, Seta Atsuko) (born March 4, 1955) is a Japanese classical pianist. She is particularly successful in Poland, especially in the southwest of the country, regularly performing with the Sudecka Philharmonic orchestra in Wałbrzych and in her native Japan and in Bulgaria. Seta is living in Poland as an Honorable Citizen of Szczawno-Zdroj city. Artistic Director of Chiangmai Ginastera International Music Festival. Honorary Professor of Payap University Thailand. Honorary Chairman of Japan Ginastera Association.

== Life ==
In 1977 she graduated from the Department of Music, Piano Course, Osaka Kyoiku University. In 1978, she completed a Postgraduate Course, starting her career as a pianist, mentored by Argentine pianist Eduardo Delgado. She also studied at the International Academy Friedrich Wilhelm Schnurre in Sion, Switzerland, in 1991 and has performed concertos in the country.

In 1996, Seta won the top prize of the Masterplayers International Music Competition in Italy and completed a master course in Flaine International Music Academy in France, also studying at the Kyoto France Music Academy. Since 1997, she has performed in Europe every year, especially piano concertos, with the Sudecka Philharmonic in Poland.

Soon after she was awarded the Masterplayers Prize in 1996, on March 20, 1997, Seta performed with her home orchestra Senri Civic Symphony Orchestra, which is called Senri Phylharmonia Osaka presently. Among the trio, the volcalist was Ai Fujiki, Seta and Fusako Tamura was on piano, Akiko Yui on clarinet, and Shungo Moriyama conducted Mozart, Saint-Saëns, and Grieg. Their 91st concerto, titled Mytown Concerto no.9 was at a hall in Seta's home town in northern Osaka.

It was in 2003 and Atsuko Seta received the Music Critic Club Prize, which has been given to the most active musician in West Japan. In 2004, she received the IBLA Grand Prize Ginastera Special Award in Italy. Seta respected Alberto Ginastera, so that during her visit to the United States in April 2005, she gave Ginastera recitals at the Yamaha Center on April 10, then at Carnegie Hall and New York University on April 11 during which she performed Ginastera Sonata No.1 amongst others. She performed that repertoire with the Sudecka Philharmonic in Wałbrzych on September 29, 2006. A music festival with contest in Thailand is named the Chiang Mai Ginastera International Music Festival which Seta started in 2016.

In 2003 and 2004, she began performing piano concertos with the Lebanese National Symphony Orchestra, the first Japanese pianist to do so, and while playing Grieg Piano Concerto First movement in A minor on June 27, 2003, then on December 10, 2004, she performed Rachmaninoff's Piano Concerto No.2 with the orchestra. Just days later she gave recitals in Italy, Ecce Homo Church in Ragusa (December 14), Santa Teresa Church in Scicli (December 15) and at the Mercedari Palace in Modica (December 18).

Seta mostly performed at concerts for charity or peace in her native Japan in 2004 and 2005, including a memorial concert in Osaka on January 16, 2005, marking 10 years since the Great Hanshin earthquake. After her visit to the United States for the performance in Los Angeles and New York City in May 2005, Seta performed with the Sudecka Philharmonic, during which she recited Mendelssohn — Trio First Movement, op. 39, Brahms — Trio Third Movement, op. 87 and Ravel Piano Concerto G-major.

Then, in November 2006, she gave a series of concerts with Italian accordionist Gino Carbonaro in Osaka and Kobe. At Christmas 2006, Seta gave special Christmas solo recitals, entitled "All Liszt Program" at the Sogakudo Hall in Tokyo and at the Takarazuka Vega Hall in Hyōgo Prefecture. On July 27, 2007, she performed Beethoven's Moonlight Sonata 3rd Movement and on September 28, 2007, she performed his Für Elise. Between October 26 and October 30, 2007, she performed at the National Philharmonic in Warsaw, Poland as part of the Japanese week.

On January 19, 2008, Seta performed in a memorial concert for Princess Galyani Vadhana in Chiang Mai. After solo recitals in late June at the Sun Heart Music Hall and Nagahama Hall in Yokohama, Constanze House in Gifu and a Salon Concert at the Singapore Embassy in Tokyo, she went to Bulgaria in November, 2008. There she performed a Khachaturian Piano Concerto with the Sofia Philharmonic Orchestra on November 20, completed a Master Course at the Bulgaria National Music Academy the following day and reperformed the Khachaturian Piano Concerto on November 25 with the Stara Zagora Opera Philharmonic Orchestra in Stara Zagora Opera Hall. She gave a more private recital on November 27, 2008, at the Bulgaria Japanese Ambassador's residence.

On February 21, 2009, Seta performed a Piano Trio in Poland with Danuta Organisciuk and Wlodek Zylin, reciting Brahms C-major. A day later, she gave a solo recital in the town of Kudowa-Zdrój. Between May 22 and 24, 2009, she performed at the Garibaldi Theatre in Ragusa, Italy. On June 3, she performed with the Veliko Tarnovo Philharmonic Orchestra in Veliko Tarnovo, Bulgaria. On November 21, 2009, Seta performed with the Chiang Mai Philharmonic Orchestra, with which she held on September 16, 2016 "a Gala to commemorate the 100th anniversary of A. Ginastera” with contest in Chiang Mai, Thailand, when she played two pieces of Ginastera as: “Malambo from Estancia” and “Toccata from Piano Concerto #1”. It was in 2010 when she has mostly performed in her native Japan, in Kyoto, Osaka and Tokyo. On May 21, 2010, she is scheduled to play Mozart's Piano Concerto No. 23 with the Sudecka Philharmonic in Wałbrzych, Poland.

=== Chiang Mai Ginastera International Music Festival ===
Seta believes that across any border, the joy of music will be shared and appreciated among the winner or losers, jury or audience at music contest. Seta organized the Chiang Mai Ginastera International Music Festival in 2016, a music festival celebrating her favorite Argentine composer A. Ginastera's 100th anniversary. Her theory and motivation is supported by the words of her favorite Argentine composer A. Ginastera, "Music is not a creation confined with nationality; it is a global creation."

The contest is formatted that all competition at any venue will be reviewed publicly, with the participating audience also contributing to make the encouraging atmosphere. No repertoire requirements, and candidates will bring their favorite repertoire for their advantage. In the final round, performance of all genres are reviewed in concert format when any instrumentalist, ensemble performer or vocalist will perform, aiming to bring an influential moments for musicians and listen to various musical instruments performed.

The contest is a part of an international music festival. In the 2016, where noted performers as the jury members performed during the early part of the festival. For 2016 and in particular, individual recitals by Eduardo Delgado on piano, Gino Carbonaro Recital (accordion), and Atsuko Seta (piano) realized the program on September 6. On the same day, contestants Esti Rofe (flute), and Ricky Tsang (piano) presented a sextet with the support of Song Hong Chamber Music members Pham Truong Son (violin), Dao Tuyet Trinh (cello), Pham Quynh Trang (piano), Krit Mekara (viola) with Apirat Praphanwong (violin II). Ilona Krzywicka, a soprano had a recital accompanied by Atsuko Seta.

The final round of the competition brought a program when the finalists play for 30 minutes each. A concert for the Junior Prize winners is followed by a gala with jury members as performers. The Chiang Mai Symphony Orchestra was conducted with and finalists in major parts.

Every year, Beethoven Symphony No. 9 the fourth movement, "Ode to Joy" is planned for the finale of the gala concert and the Festival, when the audience are encouraged and apply to Festival Special Choir. In 2016, the finale was preceded by Edualdo Delgado on piano for Ginastera Sonata No.1. In the Beethoven “Ode to Joy”, contest finalists Ilona Krzywicka (Soprano), Manator (Alto), Krzywicka (Soprano), Naprang Manator (Alto), Rungsun Poonsup (Tenor), and Viriyabhat Kitavadhana (Baritone) sang with an orchestra conducted by Chaipruck Mekara (Thailand), with Payap University Choir and the Chiang Mai International Music Festival (CGIMF) Special Choir.

=== Charity concerts ===
When Atsuko Seta moved to Chiang Mai in the 2000th, she expanded the intention of her charity piano recitals including for the future of Asian children in 2015. Recital to support disaster relief aids for both Thailand and Japan was at Chiang Mai, Thailand in 2011, which was titled “Nodame Concert”, or Nodame after a popular manga with young concert musicians as main characters.

== Style ==
A virtuoso, Seta is noted for her recitals of Beethoven, Chopin and Liszt and also Argentine composer Ginastera and Brahms. She is also well noted for her piano concertos performed with orchestras, particularly by composers such as Khachaturian, Ginastera and Rachmaninov, and has also performed concertos by Grieg and Tchaikovsky. Seta resides in Thailand and in February 2010 performed recitals of Chopin at Chopin's Anniversary concert. Seta also plays Japanese music and has performed the shamisen style music which originated from northern Japan during the aftermath of World War II. She has arranged many pieces in this style for piano. As a player she is fluid and noted in particular for her excellent control of dynamics, which enables her to perform this style effectively using sharp staccato, emulating the percussive sound of bachi against the strings of the shamisen in this musical style.

== Awards and Jury ==
=== Awards ===
- 1992 third place, Japan Classical Music Society Competition
- 1993 Best Soloist Prize, All Japan Musician's Association Competition
- 1996 Masterplayers Prize, the 13th Masterplayers International Music Competition, Italy
- 2003 Music Critic Club Prize, Japan
- 2004 Ginastera Special Award, IBLA Grand Prize, Italy

=== Juries ===
Chiangmai Symphony Orchestra held a competition for conductors and instrumentalists, and in September, served as the artistic director as well as a jury for the whole competition when Eduardo Delgado celebrated the competition award ceremony.

- 1996 Jury, Japan Classical Music Competition
- 1997–1999 Jury, Masterplayers International Music Competition
- 2014 Jury, Hong Kong International Music Competition for Young Pianists
- 2016 Jury and artistic director, Chiangmai Competition for Conductors and Instrumentalists
