= Antica Dolceria Bonajuto =

Chocolate factory in Modica

- Type: Pastry, chocolate shop
- Founded: 1880
- Headquarters: Corso Umberto, I Modica Sicily

The Antica Dolceria Bonajuto is a chocolate factory founded in Modica in 1880, known to be the oldest in Sicily and one of the oldest in Italy and for having been frequented by illustrious people of international fame.

== History ==
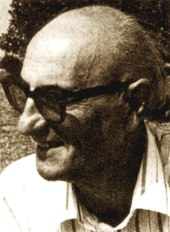
Gesualdo Bufalino.

In 1820, Vincenzo Bonajuto died prematurely, leaving ten children, and the eldest, Francesco Ignazio, invested the inherited estate in a series of commercial activities. In the first half of the 19th century, the Bonajuto family were ice sellers in the Hyblaean Mountains area. Various vicissitudes later led them to turn to pastry-making, focusing on chocolate.

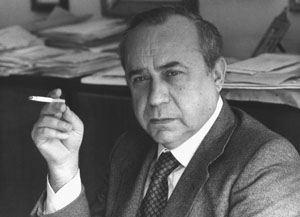
Leonardo Sciascia.

In 1853, Federico Bonajuto, son of Francesco Ignazio Bonajuto, bought a frantoio to crush cacao beans and make the amara dough in his workshop, known in dialect as "fattojo del ciccolatte". In 1880, Francesco Bonajuto founded the current premises under the name Caffè Roma, a socialist-inspired meeting place; it was renamed Antica Dolceria Bonajuto in 1992.

Since the beginning of the 90s, the company has promoted national and international gastronomic tourism in Modica, as well as cultural tourism, helping to revive the town's chocolate tradition, which had been dormant in those years. From the end of the 90s, Franco Ruta, then owner of the chocolate shop, promoted Modica chocolate through media appearances, including a television show hosted by Maurizio Costanzo in 1999 and Omnibus in 2002, and helped make it known internationally.

Patrons of the chocolate shop over the years have included the writer, journalist and art critic Leonardo Sciascia and his friend and colleague Gesualdo Bufalino (winner of the Campiello Prize in 1981 and the Strega Prize in 1988); the intellectual and writer Raffaele Poidomani; the actor Alessandro Quasimodo, son of the Modica-born Nobel laureate Salvatore Quasimodo; and the historian Giuseppe Barone.

The chocolate shop was also visited by New York Times journalist Raymond Walter Apple Jr. in 1999 during a trip to Sicily; by Wall Street Journal correspondent Frederika Randall, who had lived in Italy since 1986 and who in 2002 interviewed the owner, Franco Ruta, on Corso Umberto I; and by Lucinda Hawksley, who wrote an article for BBC News.

== Awards and acknowledgments ==
In 1911, Francesco Bonajuto's chocolates won the gold medal at the Turin International Exhibition, which was organized together with other national exhibitions such as those of Rome (where Bonajuto also received an award) and Florence. In 2014, Il Sole 24 Ore included the company among 10 century-old Italian companies that "improve the Italian economy in the world".

In 2017, the Associazione Franco Ruta was founded in honor of Franco Ruta.

== Modica chocolate and PGI controversy ==
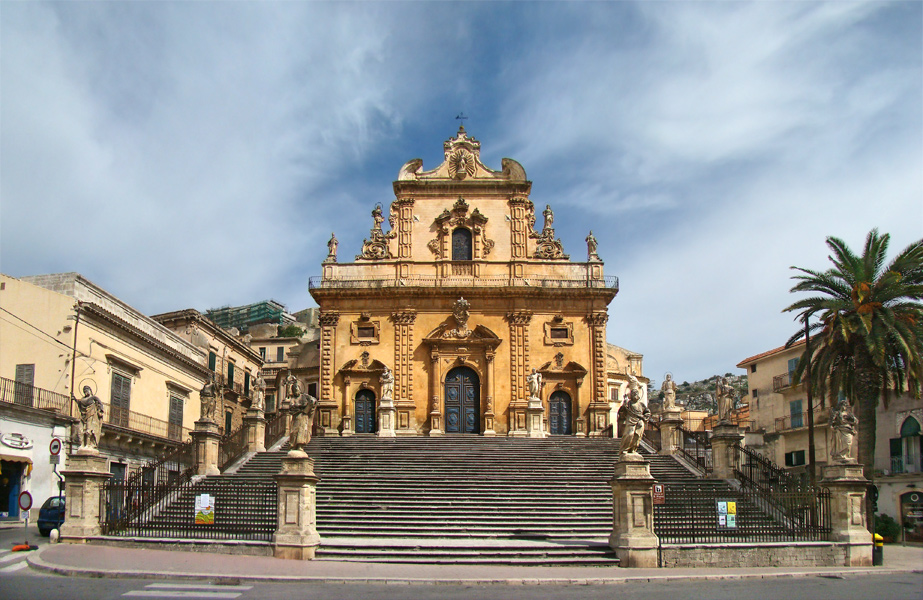
Duomo of San Pietro in front of the Antica Dolceria.

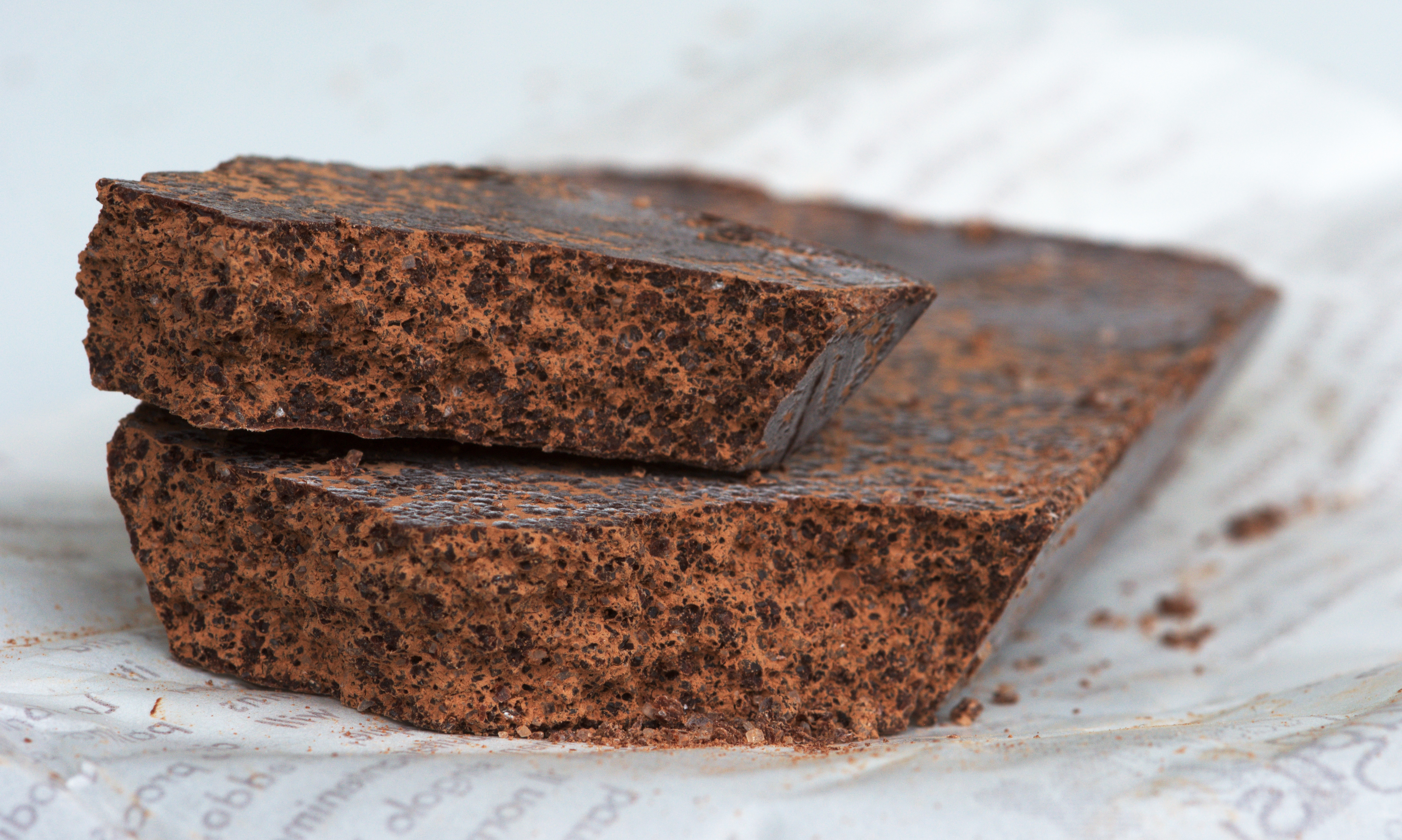
Cioccolato di Modica.

Modica chocolate, the main product of the city's "dolcerie", is made by "cold" processing of the chocolate (at approximately 40 °), which does not melt the sugar. It has received PGI recognition (Protected geographical indication) from the European Union; however, the Dolceria Bonajuto did not accept the production regulations, considering them too permissive and insufficiently recognizing the company's role in rediscovering the product.

The cocoa mass, obtained from roasted and ground seeds that retain their cocoa butter, is heated to make it fluid. It is mixed with granulated or cane sugar and can be enriched with spices such as cinnamon, vanilla, ginger or chili pepper, or with lemon or orange peel. The chocolate retains a high percentage of cocoa mass, at least 50% in the "classic" versions and up to 99% in the purest versions. The product is characterized by its simple processing; its grainy, crumbly texture, owing to the lack of a conching phase and to the sugar remaining in crystals; and the absence of added ingredients (vegetable fats, milk, soy lecithin). Modica chocolate often shows a white patina, caused by cocoa butter surfacing, and tends to crumble.

The product dates back to the 17th century, during the period of Spanish rule in Sicily, after Europeans learned chocolate-making techniques from the Aztecs.

Chocolate became established in the social fabric in the second half of the 19th century, thanks in part to progress in the food industry, which made the product accessible to the less well-off classes. Today, Modica chocolate is manufactured with the help of modern machines that comply with the established rules.

Modica, known as a Baroque city and a Unesco heritage site, is also known as the city of chocolate.

== Bibliography ==
- La dolceria Bonajuto. Storia della cioccolateria più antica di Sicilia, Giovanni Criscione, Palermo, Kalós edizioni d'arte, 2014.
- Il biscotto di legno, Raffaele Poidomani, Modica, Bonajuto, 2005.

== See also ==
List of bean-to-bar chocolate manufacturers
