= Michael Rosenzweig (composer) =

Composer, conductor

Michael Rosenzweig, born 1951 in Cape Town, South Africa, is a composer, conductor, choral trainer and director, multi-instrumentalist and jazz musician.

== Education ==
Merton Barrow provided him a thorough practical grounding as a performer. He played guitar in Merton Barrow's ensemble, the Jazz Workshop for many years. He then studied composition with Donald Martino at New England Conservatory of Music He holds the only internal London University master's degree conferred without undergraduate degree or A-levels. Michael Rosenzweig is acclaimed as one of two notable students of both Jack Beeson, the only American to study composition with Bartok, and of Chou Wen-chung, the editor of French-born American composer Edgard Varese's scores. He studied with both of them while on full scholarship and stipend from Columbia University's doctoral programme.

== Conducting ==
While assistant at the Berliner Konzertchor, he was music director of their youth choir. He conducted their Berlin Philharmonie debut. He conducted the Blacher Ensemble, the new music ensemble from the Berlin Hochschule der Kunste in their international venue debut. He also conducted Sinfonietta Berlin, his own chamber orchestra in major venues and festivals. The orchestra performed both standard repertoire and contemporary music, including premieres of his own music.

In the United Kingdom he has conducted the English Chamber Orchestra and the City of London Sinfonia.

In Central and Eastern Europe he has conducted the Sofia Philharmonic Orchestra, the Bulgarian National Radio Symphony Orchestra, Moravian Philharmonic, the Slovak State Philharmonic, Sudecka Philharmonic in Wałbrzych, Poland, the State Philharmonic of Iaşi and Vidin State Philharmonic among others. Since 2008, he has been the principal guest conductor of the Vidin State Philharmonic. He has also conducted the Royal Oman Symphony Orchestra.

== Composition ==
Maestro Michael Rosenzweig has established himself over more than forty years as a composer of note, having won many major prizes and awards, the highest being the DAAD Berliner Kunstler Fellowship in 1990, an award given to composers such as Igor Stravinsky, Roger Sessions, Elliott Carter, Krzysztof Penderecki, Luigi Dallapiccola, Luciano Berio, György Ligeti, Alberto Ginastera, and others of this eminence. He received this award at age 39. He was the youngest recipient of this award. He has also conducted the Royal Oman Symphony Orchestra.

He has over twenty successfully performed works, nineteen commissions, and four that have won important awards. His other awards include the Greater London Arts Council Young Composer's Award and the Gaudeamus Foundation, won two years running, coming both first and second in the first year.

Commissioners include the London Sinfonietta, the Arditti Quartet, State Philharmonic of Iasi, Divertimenti String Orchestra and BBC Radio 3. Performers include the RLPO, Arditti Quartet, London Sinfonietta, and the State Philharmonic of Iasi. Works have been commissioned by the BBC, the London Sinfonietta, the Divertimenti String Orchestra, and Nina Beilina.

Rosenzweig's String Quartet No. 2 (1989) was commissioned in October 1988, by the BBC for the Arditti Quartet and delivered in April 1989. It was first performed and recorded in June 1995, and broadcast by the BBC Radio 3 on 3 January 2009.

== Selected works ==
=== Commissioned works ===
- Chamber Orchestra
  - Sinfonietta 1
  - Sinfonietta 2
- String Orchestra
  - Elegy – for 13 solo strings
  - Concerto for String Orchestra
  - Fugue '97
- Chamber Ensemble
  - String Octet
- Quartet
  - Piano Quartet
  - String Quartet 2
- Trio
  - Trio for Oboe, Oboe d'Amore and Cor Anglais – GLA Young Composer Award
  - Piano Trio – GLA Young Composer Award
- Duo
- Duo for Clarinet and Piano
- Duo for Violin and Piano
  - Song Cycle for High Voice and Piano
- Solo
  - Solo for Flute
  - Solo for Bass Clarinet
  - Solo for Multipercussion
  - Solo for Vibraphone
  - Solo for Soprano Saxophone

=== Other works ===
- Orchestra
  - Symphony in One Movement – Vaughan Williams Trust Competition & Gaudeamus Award
- Choir
  - Chorale – SATB
- Quartet
  - String Quartet 1 – U Mass Bay Harbor Competition, GLA Young Composer Award
- Solo
  - Solo for Bass Clarinet
