= San Pietro, Modica =

Church building in Modica, Italy

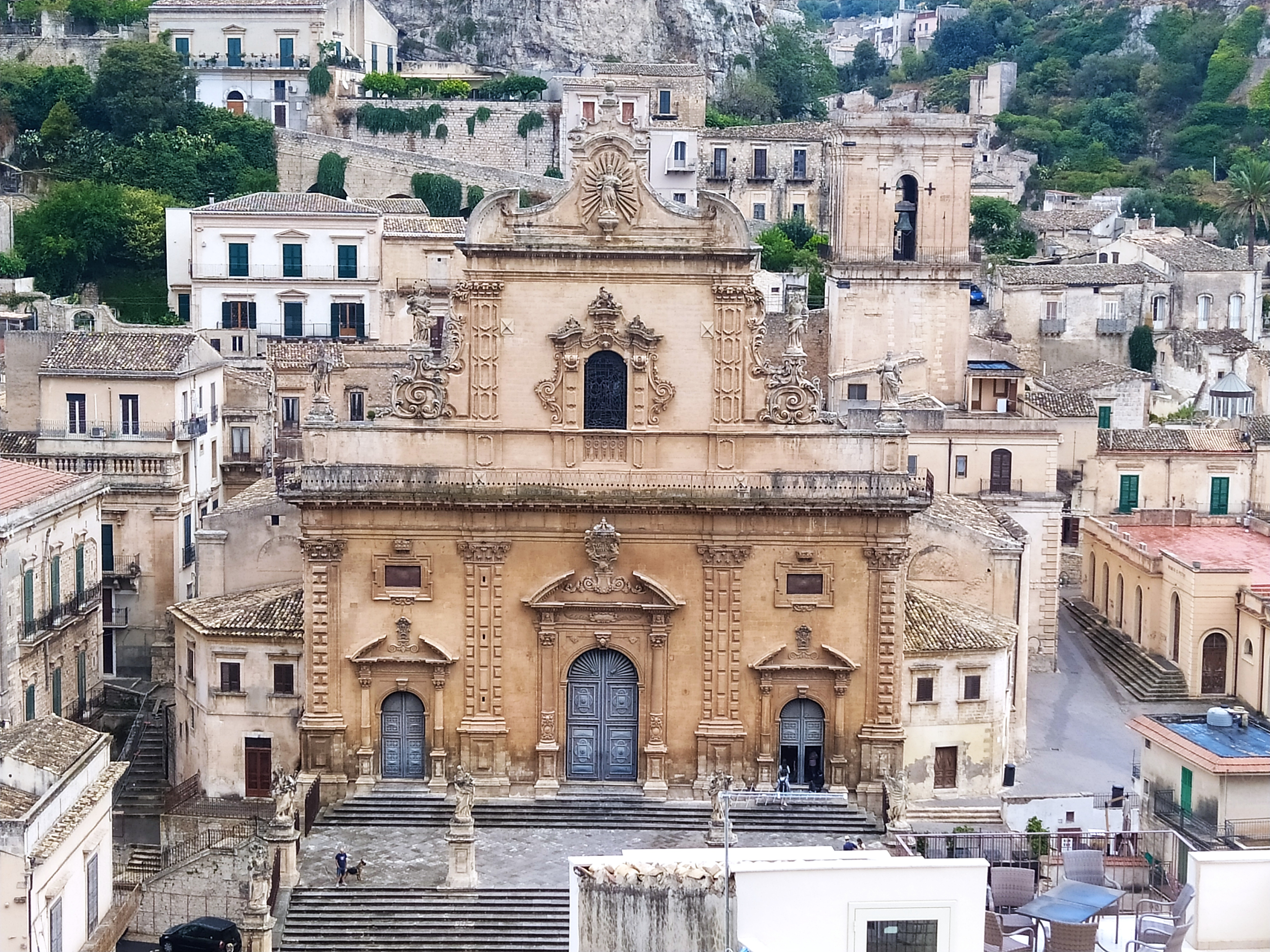

San Pietro is a Roman Catholic church located in the lower town of Modica, province of Ragusa, Sicily, Italy.

== History ==
A church at the site appears to be documented by 1308, although traditions hold that the church was founded by San Marziano, a disciple of St Peter who was the first bishop of Siracusa. This connection of the church with a pupil of St Peter has led to the prolific use inside the church of the tiara and key motifs associated with St Peter. The church was mostly destroyed by the 1693 earthquake and rebuilt in Baroque style under the guidance of Mario Spata and Rosario Boscarino. The church facade is highly decorated. The interior has three naves. Only the Chapel of the Immaculate Conception (1620), now the sacristy, remains from the pre-1693 church. The organ was added in the 19th century. The ramps of stairs leading to the portal were completed in 1876.

In the chapel at the right is a marble statue depicting the Madonna di Trapani (16th-century). The altar has a polychrome icon of te Immaculate conception, to its side are statues of St Peter and St Paul, all works (1773-1775) by Pietro Padula. In the 1780s, the ceiling panels were frescoed by Giovanni Battista Ragazzi with scenes from the Old Testament.
