= Takarazuka Vega Hall =

Concert hall in Hyogo, Japan

Coordinates: 34°48′39.6″N 135°21′8.2″E

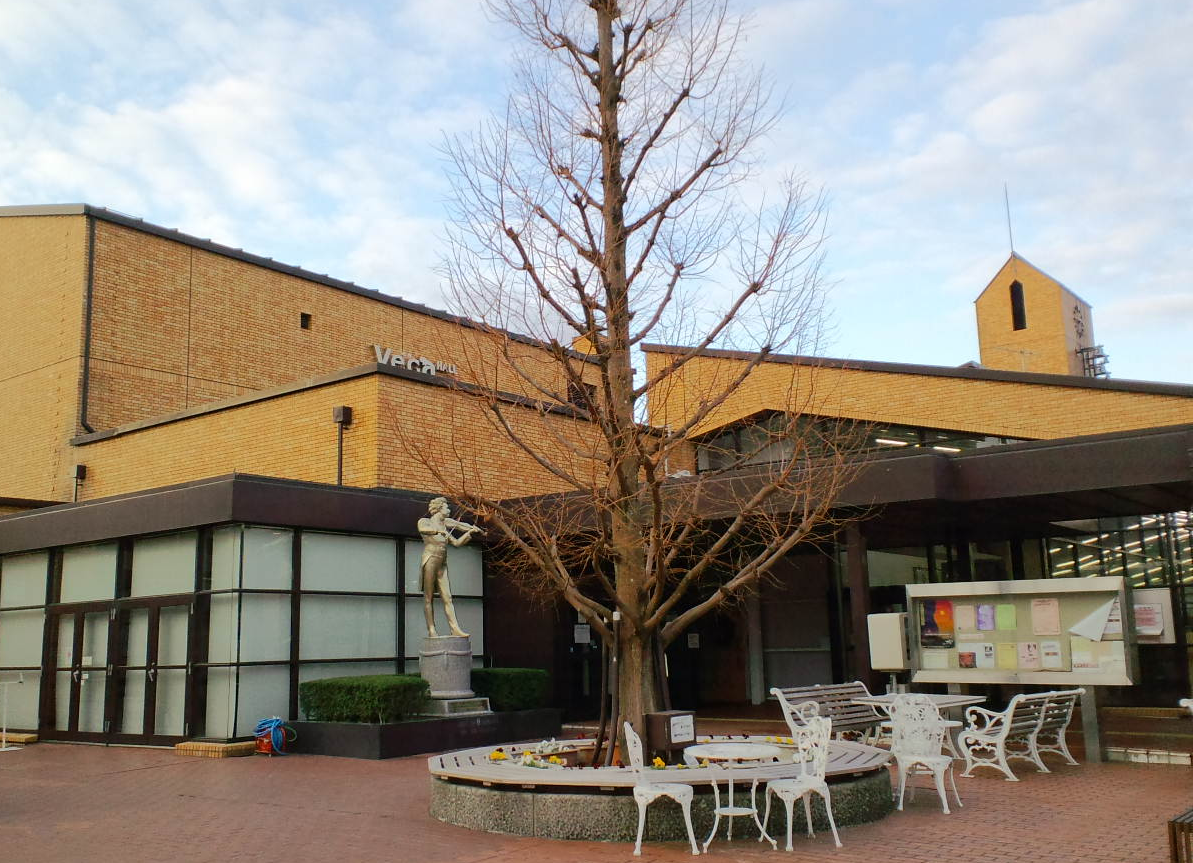
Takarazuka Vega Hall

Takarazuka Vega Hall (宝塚ベガ・ホール) is a concert hall in Hyogo, Japan. It has hosted concerts by some of Japan's most successful musicians. In December 2006, pianist Atsuko Seta gave a recital in the hall.
