= Platytes strigatalis =

Scientific classification
- Kingdom: Animalia
- Phylum: Arthropoda
- Class: Insecta
- Order: Lepidoptera
- Family: Crambidae
- Subfamily: Crambinae
- Tribe: Crambini
- Genus: Platytes
- Species: P. strigatalis

Binomial name
- Platytes strigatalis (Hampson, 1900)

Synonyms
- Diptychophora strigatalis Hampson, 1900

Species of moth

Platytes strigatalis is a moth in the family Crambidae. It was described by George Hampson in 1900. It is found in the Russian Far East (Amur, Ussuri).
