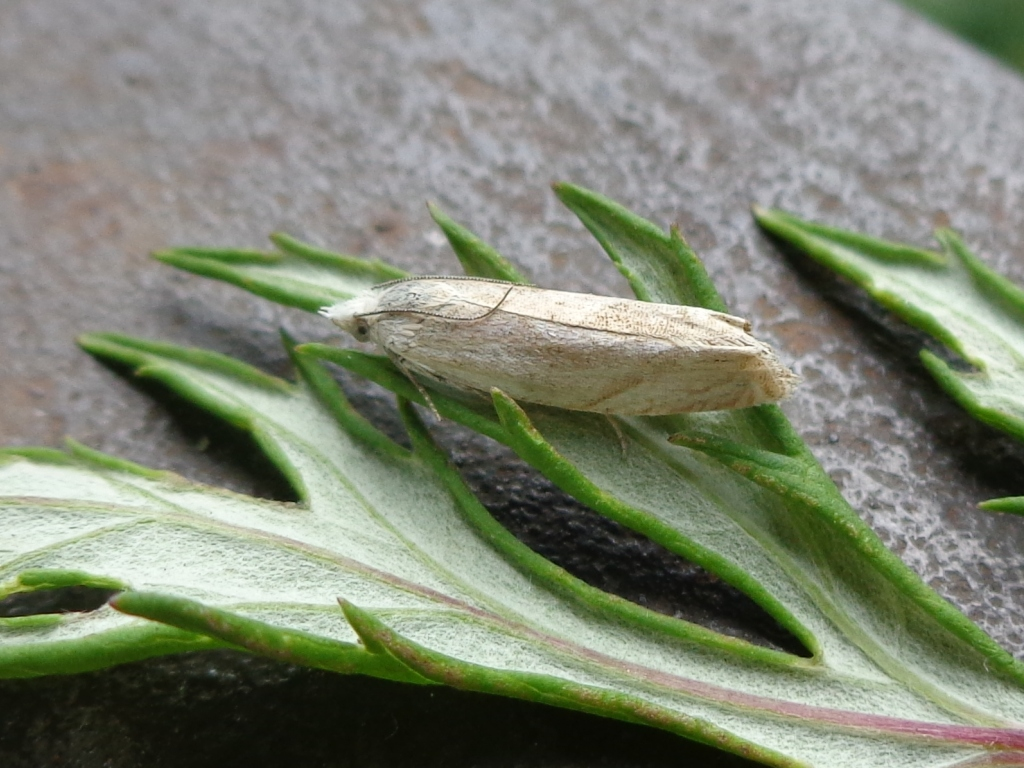

Scientific classification
- Domain: Eukaryota
- Kingdom: Animalia
- Phylum: Arthropoda
- Class: Insecta
- Order: Lepidoptera
- Family: Crambidae
- Subfamily: Crambinae
- Tribe: Crambini
- Genus: Platytes
- Species: P. cerussella

Binomial name
- Platytes cerussella (Denis & Schiffermuller, 1775)

Synonyms
- Tinea cerussella Denis & Schiffermuller, 1775; Crambus cerucellus Wood, 1839; Crambus cerusellus Stephens, 1834; Crambus pygmaeus Stephens, 1834; Crambus pygmaeus Stephens, 1829; Platytes quadrella Denis & Schiffermüller, 1775; Tinea auriferella Hübner, 1796; Palparia aurifera Haworth, 1811; Thisanotia auriferalis Hübner, 1825; Tinea barbella Hübner, 1796; Palparia barba Haworth, 1811

= Platytes cerussella =

Species of moth

Platytes cerussella is a species of moth in the family Crambidae. It is found in almost all of Europe.

The wingspan is 12–16 mm. Males are darker in tone than females and usually slightly larger. Adults are usually flying in June and July.

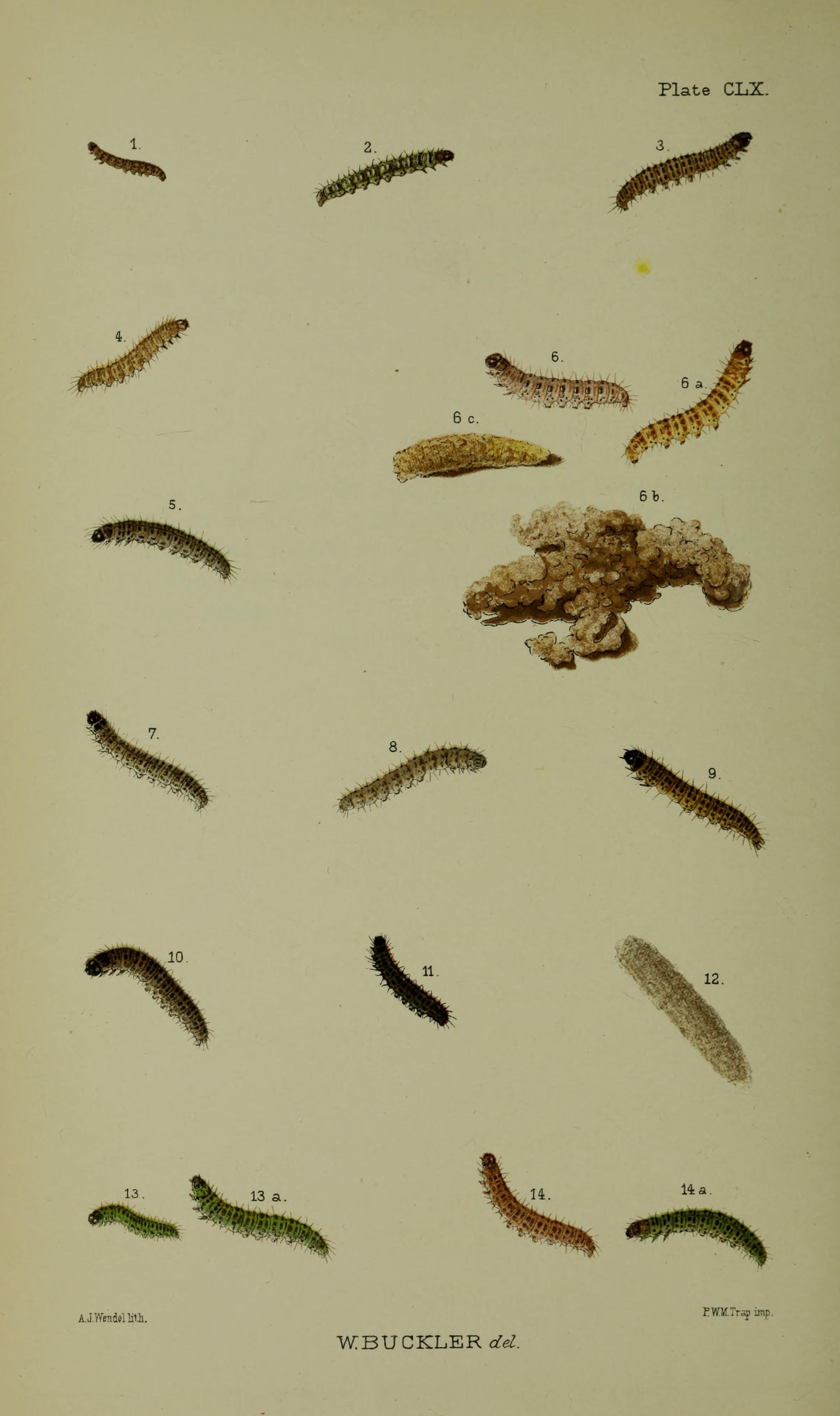
Fig. 1 larva after final moult

The larvae feed on the roots of various plants growing under stones in sandy soil, including Carex arenaria, Festuca and other Gramineae species.
