= Eduardo Delgado =

Argentine musician

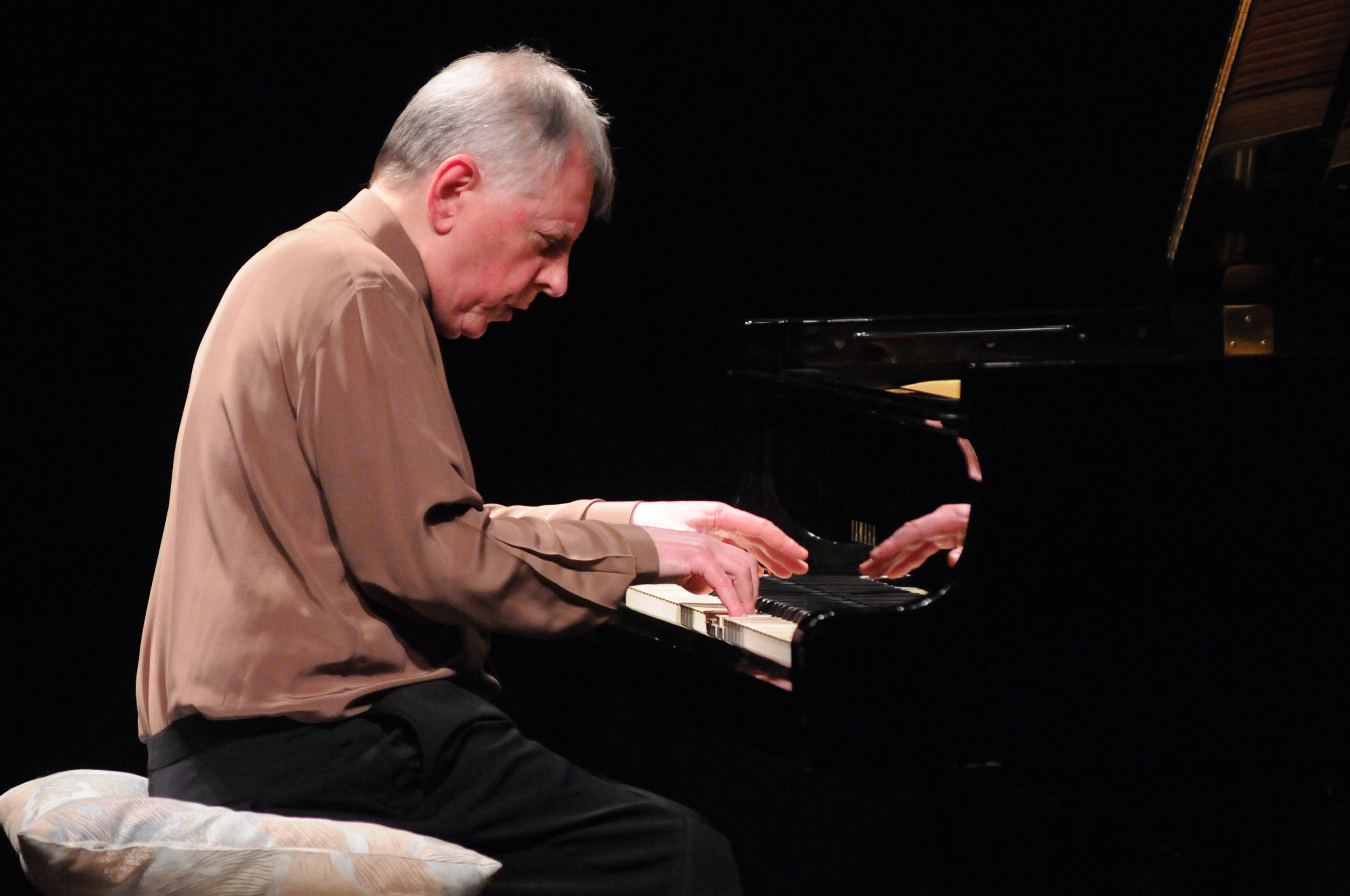
Eduardo Delgado

Eduardo Delgado (born October 3, 1943) is an Argentine classical pianist and teacher living in California. Born in Rosario, Argentina, Delgado is a recipient of the Vladimir Horowitz Award and has received grants from the Mozarteum Argentino, Martha Baird Rockefeller, and the Concert Artists Guild. In 1999, he was awarded by UNESCO in Buenos Aires. Delgado has given recitals all over the world, in Europe, Asia, South America and North America.

== Mentoring ==
Delgado has participated in international competition juries such as the William Kapell, the Gina Bachauer, and the Vega in Japan and in 2003 he served as a juror in the 2nd Martha Argerich International Piano Competition in Buenos Aires. In 2009 he was a member of the jury at the San Antonio International Piano Competition. He is also noted for his extensive work in teaching in universities and workshops in Japan, mentoring, among others, Japanese pianist Atsuko Seta.

He is a part-time instructor at the California State University, Fullerton, where he has established a scholarship fund for pianists in tribute to the renowned late pianist Alicia de Larrocha. To promote this fund, he gave an inaugural recital in 1998 with Alicia de Larrocha herself at the Richard Nixon Library in Yorba Linda, California. Delgado is also the founder of the Castle Green Historic & Cultural Society in his residual town of Pasadena, California.

== Recordings ==
Delgado has recorded the full works of Argentine composer Alberto Ginastera. He has also performed the works of other Argentine composers such as Carlos Guastavino, Alberto Williams, Juan José Castro, Alicia Terzian, Antonio Tauriello and Carlos López Buchardo. Delgado has also recorded the romantic works of Schumann, Liszt, Chopin and Mendelssohn as well as Bach, Mozart and Beethoven.

Delgado is a regular performer at the Verbier Festival in Switzerland and the Martha Argerich Festival in Lugano and Buenos Aires. He has collaborated with Martha Argerich in several duets, the most recent being Tres Romances by Carlos Guastavino. In April 2009 he performed with the Los Angeles Philharmonic Orchestra, in an all-Russian Program which featured the recitals of Prokofiev, Arensky, and Stravinsky. Delgado has also recorded with tenor José Cura.

Delgado is an internationally acclaimed pianist. Norwegian critics have described Delgado as “a pianist of a thousand nuances, a fantastic experience.” In Russia, the Sovetskaya Kultura wrote about Delgado, “Delgado’s Bach had brilliance, a profound meditation and a musical tone rarely heard.”
