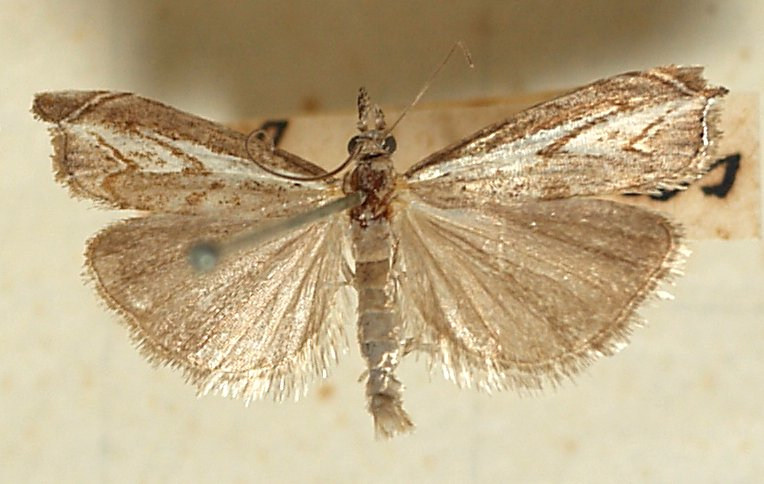

Scientific classification
- Kingdom: Animalia
- Phylum: Arthropoda
- Clade: Pancrustacea
- Class: Insecta
- Order: Lepidoptera
- Family: Crambidae
- Subfamily: Crambinae
- Tribe: Crambini
- Genus: Platytes
- Species: P. alpinella

Binomial name
- Platytes alpinella (Hübner, 1813)

Synonyms
- Tinea alpinella Hübner, 1813; Argyroteuchia alpicolalis Hübner, 1825

= Platytes alpinella =

Species of moth

Platytes alpinella is a species of moth of the family Crambidae described by Jacob Hübner in 1813. It is found in Europe, the area surrounding the Caucasus and the eastern part of Russia.

The wingspan is 18–22 mm. The forewings with apex strongly triangularly produced; brown, mixed with dark fuscous and whitish; a white longitudinal central streak, posteriorly suffused; median and second lines sharply angulated outwards above middle and above dorsum, median dark ochreous brown, blackish on lower edge of central streak, second white, edged with dark brown, in disc posteriorly with blackish; cilia silvery-metallic towards middle. Hindwings grey.

The moth flies from June to September depending on the location.

The larvae feed on various mosses, mainly Tortula species.
