= Platytes duplicilinea =

Scientific classification
- Kingdom: Animalia
- Phylum: Arthropoda
- Class: Insecta
- Order: Lepidoptera
- Family: Crambidae
- Subfamily: Crambinae
- Tribe: Crambini
- Genus: Platytes
- Species: P. duplicilinea

Binomial name
- Platytes duplicilinea (Hampson, 1919)

Synonyms
- Argyria duplicilinea Hampson, 1919

Species of moth

Platytes duplicilinea is a moth in the family Crambidae. It was described by George Hampson in 1919. It is found in Ghana and Sierra Leone.
