= Platytes vobisne =

Scientific classification
- Kingdom: Animalia
- Phylum: Arthropoda
- Class: Insecta
- Order: Lepidoptera
- Family: Crambidae
- Subfamily: Crambinae
- Tribe: Crambini
- Genus: Platytes
- Species: P. vobisne

Binomial name
- Platytes vobisne Dyar, 1920

Species of moth

Platytes vobisne is a moth in the family Crambidae. It was described by Harrison Gray Dyar Jr. in 1920. It has been recorded from the US states of Illinois, Indiana, Kansas, Massachusetts, Michigan, Minnesota, South Dakota and Wisconsin. The habitat consists of grasslands.

The wingspan is 12–13 mm. Adults have been recorded on wing from May to July.
