= Sun Heart Music Hall =

Coordinates: 35.464091°N 139.532697°E

Sun Heart Music Hall is a concert hall in Yokohama, Japan. It has hosted concerts by some of Japan's most successful musicians. In 2008, pianist Atsuko Seta gave a recital in the hall.
