= Platytes albipennella =

Scientific classification
- Kingdom: Animalia
- Phylum: Arthropoda
- Class: Insecta
- Order: Lepidoptera
- Family: Crambidae
- Subfamily: Crambinae
- Tribe: Crambini
- Genus: Platytes
- Species: P. albipennella

Binomial name
- Platytes albipennella Hampson, 1896

Synonyms
- Platytes albipenella Hampson, 1898

Species of moth

Platytes albipennella is a moth in the family Crambidae, described by George Hampson in 1896, in the Punjab region of what was British India.
