= Platytes argyrotricha =

Scientific classification
- Kingdom: Animalia
- Phylum: Arthropoda
- Class: Insecta
- Order: Lepidoptera
- Family: Crambidae
- Subfamily: Crambinae
- Tribe: Crambini
- Genus: Platytes
- Species: P. argyrotricha

Binomial name
- Platytes argyrotricha Hampson, 1908

Species of moth

Platytes argyrotricha is a moth in the family Crambidae. It was described by George Hampson in 1908. It is found in Assam, India.
