= Platytes ornatellus =

Scientific classification
- Domain: Eukaryota
- Kingdom: Animalia
- Phylum: Arthropoda
- Class: Insecta
- Order: Lepidoptera
- Family: Crambidae
- Subfamily: Crambinae
- Tribe: Crambini
- Genus: Platytes
- Species: P. ornatellus

Binomial name
- Platytes ornatellus (Leech, 1889)

Synonyms
- Crambus ornatellus Leech, 1889; Platytes ornatella; Platytes acaudatula Filipjev, 1927

Species of moth

Platytes ornatellus is a moth in the family Crambidae. It was described by John Henry Leech in 1889. It is found in the Russian Far East (Minussinsk, Ussuri), China (Manchuria, Shandong, Szechwan, Tibet), Korea and Japan.
