= Platytes poliopepla =

Scientific classification
- Domain: Eukaryota
- Kingdom: Animalia
- Phylum: Arthropoda
- Class: Insecta
- Order: Lepidoptera
- Family: Crambidae
- Subfamily: Crambinae
- Tribe: Crambini
- Genus: Platytes
- Species: P. poliopepla

Binomial name
- Platytes poliopepla Lower, 1905

Species of moth

Platytes poliopepla is a moth in the family Crambidae. It was described by Oswald Bertram Lower in 1905. It is found in Australia, where it has been recorded from Victoria.
