= Platytes platysticha =

Scientific classification
- Domain: Eukaryota
- Kingdom: Animalia
- Phylum: Arthropoda
- Class: Insecta
- Order: Lepidoptera
- Family: Crambidae
- Subfamily: Crambinae
- Tribe: Crambini
- Genus: Platytes
- Species: P. platysticha

Binomial name
- Platytes platysticha Turner, 1939

Species of moth

Platytes platysticha is a moth in the family Crambidae. It was described by Turner in 1939. It is found in Australia, where it has been recorded from Tasmania.

The wingspan is about 23 mm.
