= Platytes atlantivolella =

Scientific classification
- Domain: Eukaryota
- Kingdom: Animalia
- Phylum: Arthropoda
- Class: Insecta
- Order: Lepidoptera
- Family: Crambidae
- Subfamily: Crambinae
- Tribe: Crambini
- Genus: Platytes
- Species: P. atlantivolella

Binomial name
- Platytes atlantivolella Zerny, 1935

Species of moth

Platytes atlantivolella is a moth in the family Crambidae. It was described by Zerny in 1935. It is found in Morocco (the High Atlas).
