= Nagahama (surname) =

Nagahama (written: 長濱 or 長浜) is a Japanese surname. Notable people with the surname include:

- Hiroshi Nagahama (長濱 博史) (born 1970), Japanese animator
- Hiroyuki Nagahama (長浜 博行) (born 1958), politician of the Democratic Party of Japan
- Kazutoshi Nagahama (長浜 一年) (born 1969), former Japanese cross-country skier
- Tadao Nagahama (長浜 忠夫) (1936–1980), director of puppet shows and animation
- Neru Nagahama (長濱 ねる) (born 1998), retired Japanese idol

== See also ==
- Nagahama (disambiguation)
