= Tommaso Campailla =

Italian philosopher and poet (1668–1740)

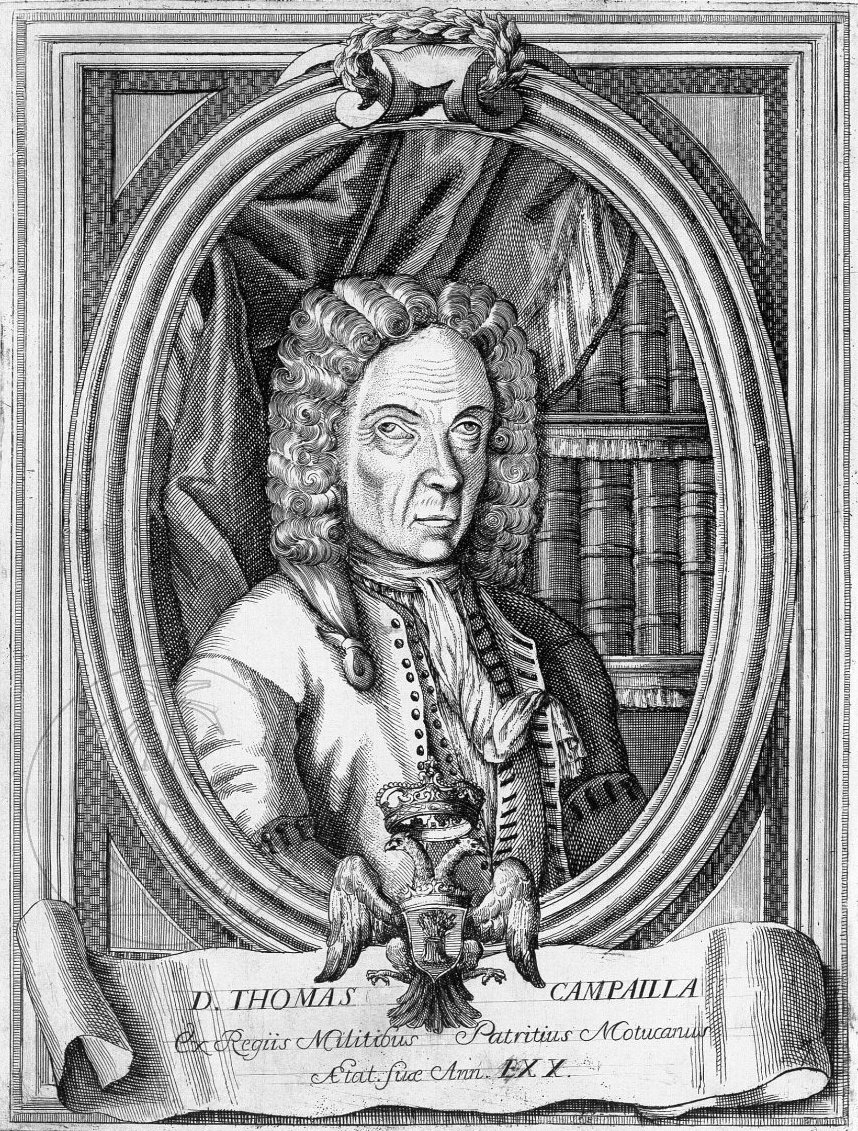
- Engraving of Tommaso Campailla (1737)
- Born: 7 April 1668; Modica, Kingdom of Sicily
- Died: 7 February 1740 (aged 71); Modica, Kingdom of Sicily
- Resting place: San Giorgio Cathedral, Modica
- Occupations: Philosopher; Poet; Physician
- Spouse: Antonia Giovanna Leva (m. 1694)
- Children: 2
- Parent(s): Antonio Campailla and Adriana Campailla (née Giardina)

Academic background
- Education: University of Catania
- Influences: Descartes; Gassendi; Malebranche; Newton; Borelli; Fardella

Tommaso Campailla (7 April 1668 – 7 February 1740) was an Italian philosopher, physician, politician and poet.

== Life ==
Tommaso Campailla was born in Modica, near Syracuse, in 1668. His family belonged to the local nobility. At sixteen he was sent to Catania to study law. He employed his leisure hours in the study of literature, philosophy, science, astronomy, and physics. He studied both neo-Scholastic and Cartesian philosophy, and adopted a mechanical view of the universe.

After the death of his father, Campailla devoted himself to the natural sciences, and to medicine. He practised medicine successfully and taught local physicians. Following a syphilis epidemic that slaughtered the city in the early 18th century, Campailla devoted himself to a systematic search for chemical substances which would cure the infectious disease. In 1698 he introduced fumigation stoves known as botti (barrels), within which patients were suffumigated with cinnabar and incense which were inhaled and absorbed by the sick. In addition to syphilis they were also used to cure tuberculosis. Through this practice, but also thanks to the success of some works on fevers and a treatise on physiology influenced by the iatrophysicist Borelli, Campailla brought the Modica school of medicine to the forefront.

Campailla's most significant work was the philosophical poem in twenty cantos L'Adamo, ovvero il mondo creato (Adam or the created world). The poem describes Adam, the first human (a symbol of good nature that has not yet been corrupted), discovering and contemplating the truths and beauties of the created universe through the help of the archangel Raphael. The first incomplete edition of the poem was published at the beginning of the 18th century (Mazarino and Catania, 1709). The complete edition was published in Messina in 1728, and reissued posthumously in Milan in 1744. The poem achieved remarkable success and earned him a reputation both in Italy and abroad.

The philosopher George Berkeley visited Campailla in his home in Modica in 1718 and introduced him to the works of Isaac Newton, which were to exert significant influence on Campailla's later writings. Berkeley promised to introduce the Italian's work to the scientific circles in England. In 1723, Berkeley sent Campailla from London Newton's Principia and Opticks “as a pledge of sincere friendship” («tamquam sincerae amicitiae pignus»). He informed Campailla that he had given his books "Viro erudito e Societate Regia", "qui cum solertiam, & ingenium tuum pro meritis extimet, tum id plurimum miratur, tantum scientiae lumen in extremo Siciliae angulo tam diu delituisse." The degree to which Campailla and Berkeley might have influenced one another has been debated.

In 1738 Campailla published a series of dialogues in Italian confuting Newtonian physics from a Cartesian perspective. Campailla's dialogues were highly commended by the secretary of the French Academy of Sciences Bernard Le Bovier de Fontenelle.

Campailla was a close friend of Ludovico Antonio Muratori, with whom he corresponded throughout his life. He was also an acquaintance of the Sicilian poet Girolama Lorefice Grimaldi. He was a member of the Arcadian academy, using the pseudonym 'Andremoneo'.

On 24 October 1694 Campailla married Antonia Giovanna Leva, by whom he had two children. He was elected a senator seven times, and refused professorships in London and Padua because of his reluctance to travel. He died of a stroke on 7 February 1740, aged 72, and was buried near the altar of Modica's Cathedral. A plaque to his memory was erected by the church's entrance.

The Museo Medico Tommaso Campailla, in Piazza Campailla, Modica, is named after him. It contains the medical equipment he used, his anatomical theatre, his medical volumes, and more recent photographs of the stages of syphilitic progression. A high school in Modica is named after him.

== Works ==
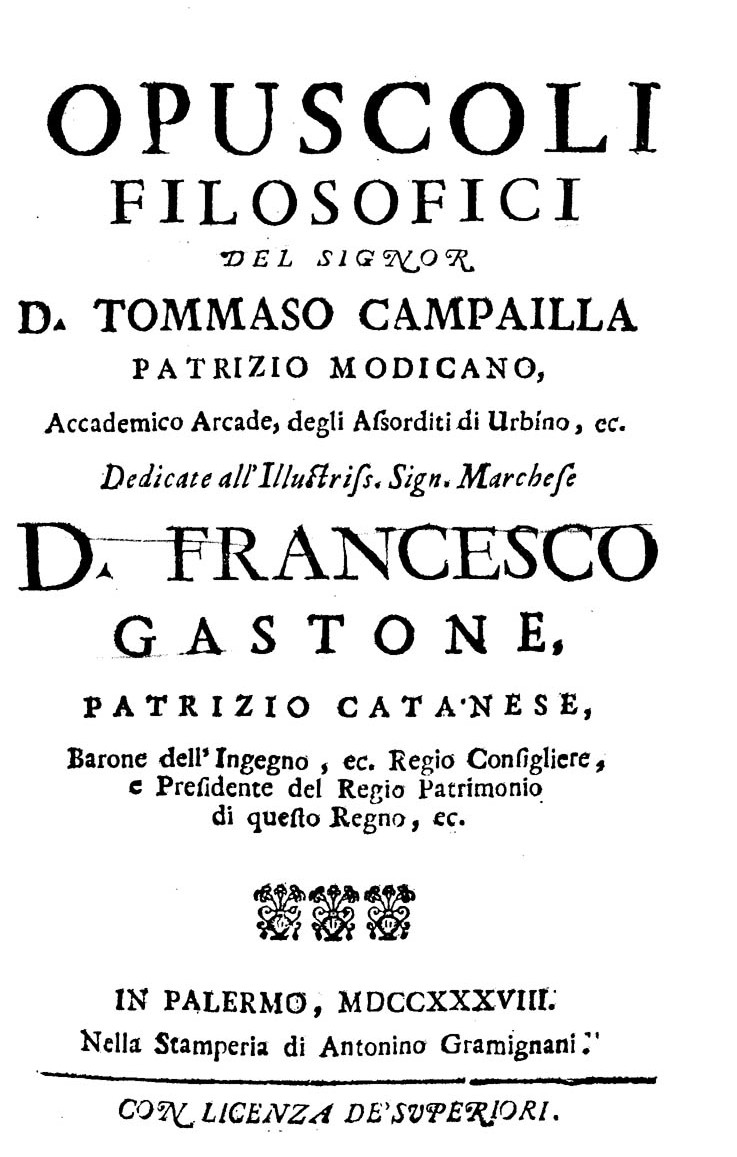
Opuscoli filosofici, 1738

- L'Adamo ovvero il mondo creato, poema filosofico, I, Catania 1709; II, Messina 1723.
- Discorso in cui si risponde alle Opposizioni fattegli dal Sig.r Dottore G. Moncada sopra la sua sentenza della fermentazione. Palermo. 1709.
- Del moto degli animali. Palermo: Antonio Pecora. 1710.
- Gli Emblemi. Palermo: Amato. 1715.
- Problemi naturali. Palermo: G. B. Aiccardo. 1727.
- "Rime di Serpilla Leonzio". Rime degli Ereini di Palermo. 1. Rome: per il Bernabò: 371–372. 1734.
- Discorso diretto all'Accademia del Buon Gusto, dell'incendio dell'Etna e come si accende, Palermo 1738.
- Opuscoli filosofici (in Italian). Palermo: Antonio Gramignani. 1738.
- L'Apocalisse dell'apostolo san Paolo, poema sacro. Rome: ad istanza dell'Accademia degli Ereini di Palermo. 1738.
- Filosofia per principi e cavalieri, 2 vols., Siracusa 1841.
- Alberto Vecchi, ed. (1956). Lettere di Tommaso Campailla a Lodovico Antonio Muratori. Modena: Aedes Muratoriana.
- Aldo Gerbino, ed. (2016). Trattato sulla fermentazione. Armillaria. ISBN 9788899554118.

== Sources ==
- Tommaso Campailla entry (in Italian) by Antonio Belloni in the Enciclopedia Treccani, 1930
- Rossi, Mario-Manlio (1921). "Il viaggio di Berkeley in Sicilia e i suoi rapporti con un filosofo poeta". Archiv für Geschichte der Philosophie. XXVI (3–4): 156–165. doi:10.1515/agph.1921.33.3-4.156.
- Cristofolini, Paolo (1974). "CAMPAILLA, Tommaso". Dizionario Biografico degli Italiani (in Italian). Vol. 17: Calvart–Canefri. Rome: Istituto dell'Enciclopedia Italiana. ISBN 978-88-12-00032-6.
- Ottaviano, Carmelo (1999). Tommaso Campailla: contributo all'interpretazione e alla storia del cartesianesimo in Italia. Padua: CEDAM. ISBN 9788813219307.
- Buscemi, Maria (2007). "The guiacum barrels between science and esoterism: Tommaso Campailla genius loci". Medicina Nei Secoli. 19 (2): 577–87. PMID 18450036.
- Gerbino, Aldo (2007). "Tommaso Campailla: dream stuff and the hypochondria of an eclectic". Medicina Nei Secoli. 19 (2): 481–93. PMID 18450029.
- Charles, Sébastien (2009). "Berkeley et Campailla: Rencontre infructueuse ou influence probable?". Giornale Critico della Filosofia Italiana. 88: 25–40.
- Maatouk, Ismaël (2013). "Tommaso Campailla and the Syphilis Museum in Sicily". JAMA Dermatology. 149 (11): 1318. doi:10.1001/jamadermatol.2013.7819. PMID 24257583.
- Gelmetti, Carlo (2015). "Tommaso Campailla". Storia della Dermatologia e della Venereologia in Italia. Springer Milan. pp. 70–72. ISBN 9788847057173.
- Pareti, Germana (2019). "Scholars and medicine in Sicily between the 18th and 19th centuries. Medical knowledge and universal history". Medicina Historica. 3 (3): 149–155.
- Carta, Ambra (2022). "'L'Adamo, ovvero Il Mondo Creato' di Tommaso Campailla. Un contributo al rinnovamento della cultura scientifica e letteraria in Sicilia". Critica Letteraria. 196 (3): 456–472. doi:10.26379/1690.
