= Mercedari Palace =

Mercedari Palace or the Palazzo Mercedari is a palace and civic and ethnographical museum in Modica, Italy. It was built in the 18th century as a convent for the Fathers of Meredari, attached to the S. Maria delle Grazie sanctuary. Today, the palace contains the library and museum. It often hosts classical music recitals. On December 18, 2004, Japanese pianist Atsuko Seta performed at the palace.
