= Chiesa del Carmine, Modica =

Roman Catholic church in Sicily, Italy

Coordinates: 36.8574°N 14.7612°E

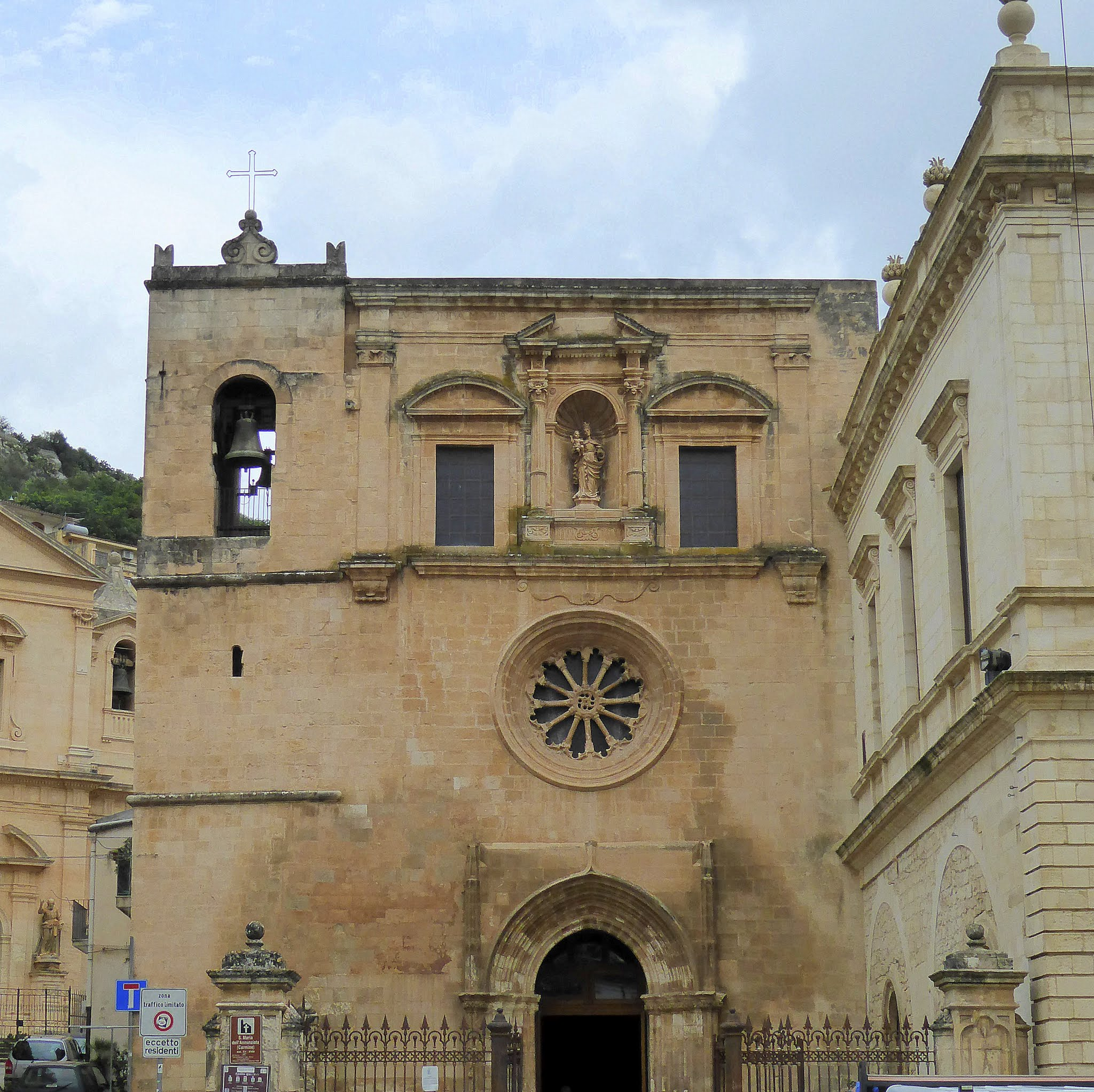

The Chiesa del Carmine is a Roman Catholic church located on Corso Umberto in the town of Modica, province of Ragusa, Sicily, Italy.

== History ==
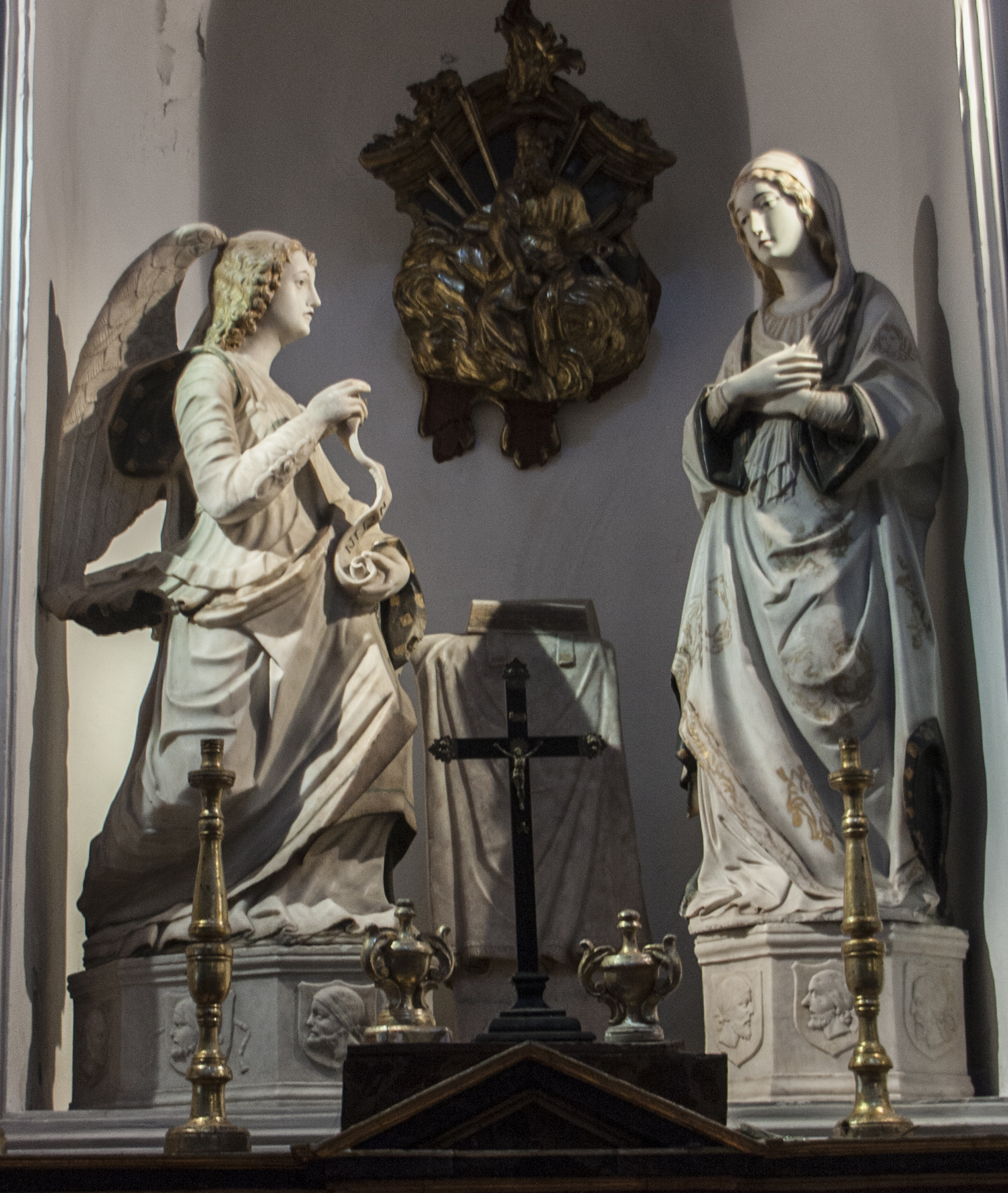

A church at the site along with the convent of the Carmelites was established in Modica by 1390. Most of the church survived the 1693 Sicily earthquake, retaining some of the gothic and romanesque elements, including the portal. Atop the portal is a carved rose window of Saint Margaret. On the left of the facade is the original bell-tower. The interior has a single nave with an apse delimited by pilasters rising to a pointed arch. The ribbed vaults of the roof and walls have traces of medieval frescoes. The interior houses the Pala di Sant'Alberto, an altarpiece depicting this Carmelite Saint holding a book and lily in one hand, and a crucifix in the other. This altarpiece was likely a fragment of a larger 16th-century polyptych. Some attribute the work to Cesare da Sesto. The church has a marble sculpture of the Annunciation, probably by Antonello Gagini.
