= Nagahama Hall =

Concert hall in Japan

Coordinates: 35.357254°N 139.636729°E

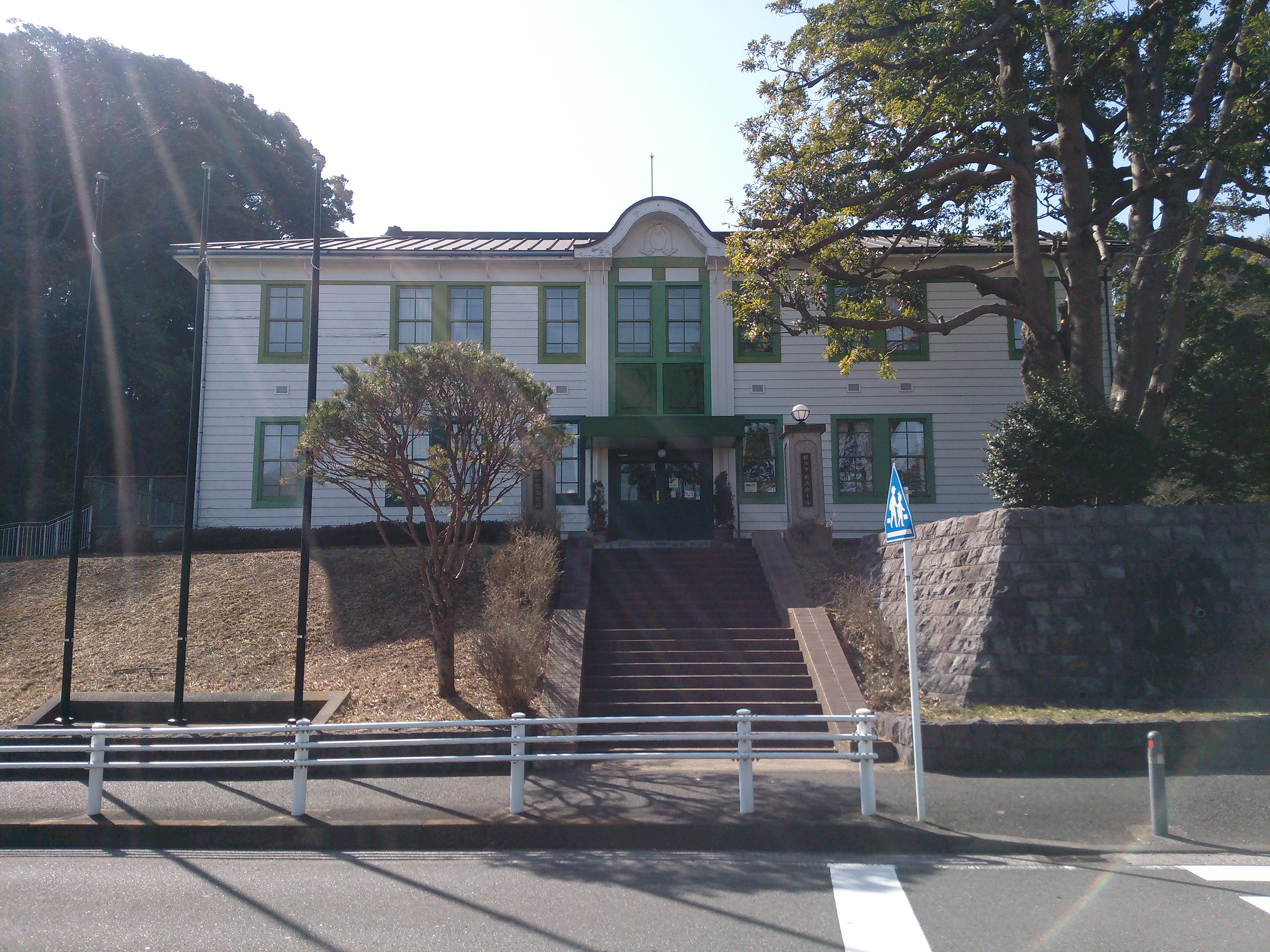
Nagahama Hall

Nagahama Hall (長浜ホール) is a concert hall located in the Hideyo Noguchi Memorial Park in Yokohama, Japan. Built in 1952, it has hosted concerts by some of Japan's most successful musicians. In 2008, pianist Atsuko Seta gave a recital in the hall.
