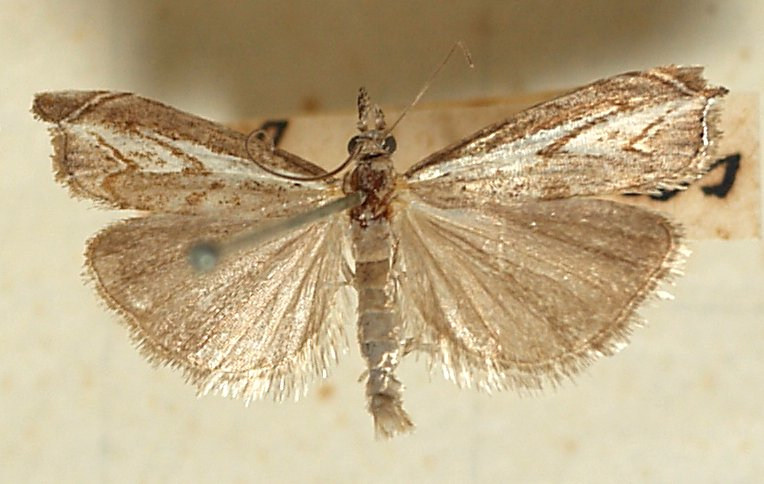
- Platytes alpinella

Scientific classification
- Domain: Eukaryota
- Kingdom: Animalia
- Phylum: Arthropoda
- Class: Insecta
- Order: Lepidoptera
- Family: Crambidae
- Tribe: Crambini
- Genus: Platytes; Guenée, 1845

Synonyms
- Nagahama Marumo, 1933

= Platytes =

Genus of moths

Platytes is a genus of moths of the family Crambidae.

== Species ==
- Platytes albipennella Hampson, 1896
- Platytes alpinella (Hübner, 1813)
- Platytes argyrotricha Hampson, 1908
- Platytes atlantivolella Zerny, 1935
- Platytes cerussella (Denis & Schiffermüller, 1775)
- Platytes duplicilinea (Hampson, 1919)
- Platytes ornatellus (Leech, 1889)
- Platytes platysticha Turner, 1939
- Platytes poliopepla Lower, 1905
- Platytes strigatalis (Hampson, 1900)
- Platytes vobisne Dyar, 1920
