= Cioccolato di Modica =

Italian specialty chocolate

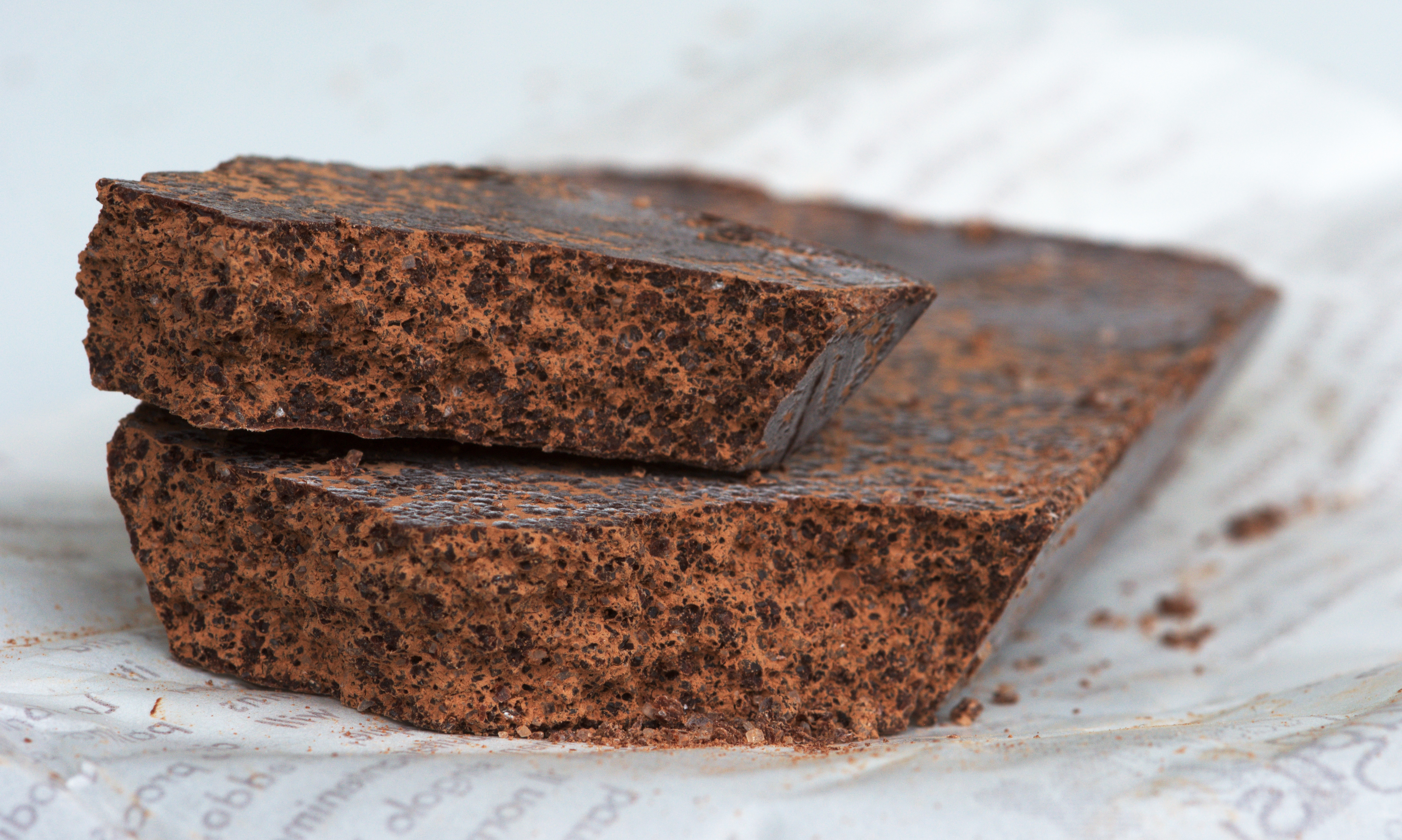
Modica chocolate with cocoa butter blooming

The cioccolato di Modica (Modica chocolate or chocolate of Modica, also known as cioccolata modicana) is an Italian protected geographical indication (PGI) specialty chocolate, typical of the comune (municipality) of Modica, in Sicily, characterized by an ancient and original recipe using manual grinding (rather than conching) which gives the chocolate a peculiar grainy texture and aromatic flavor. As a prodotto agroalimentare tradizionale (PAT), it is a specialty officially recognized by the Italian Ministry of Agriculture, Food and Forestry Policies. Modica chocolate is made "cold" (a freddo) according to a traditional recipe and is not conched.

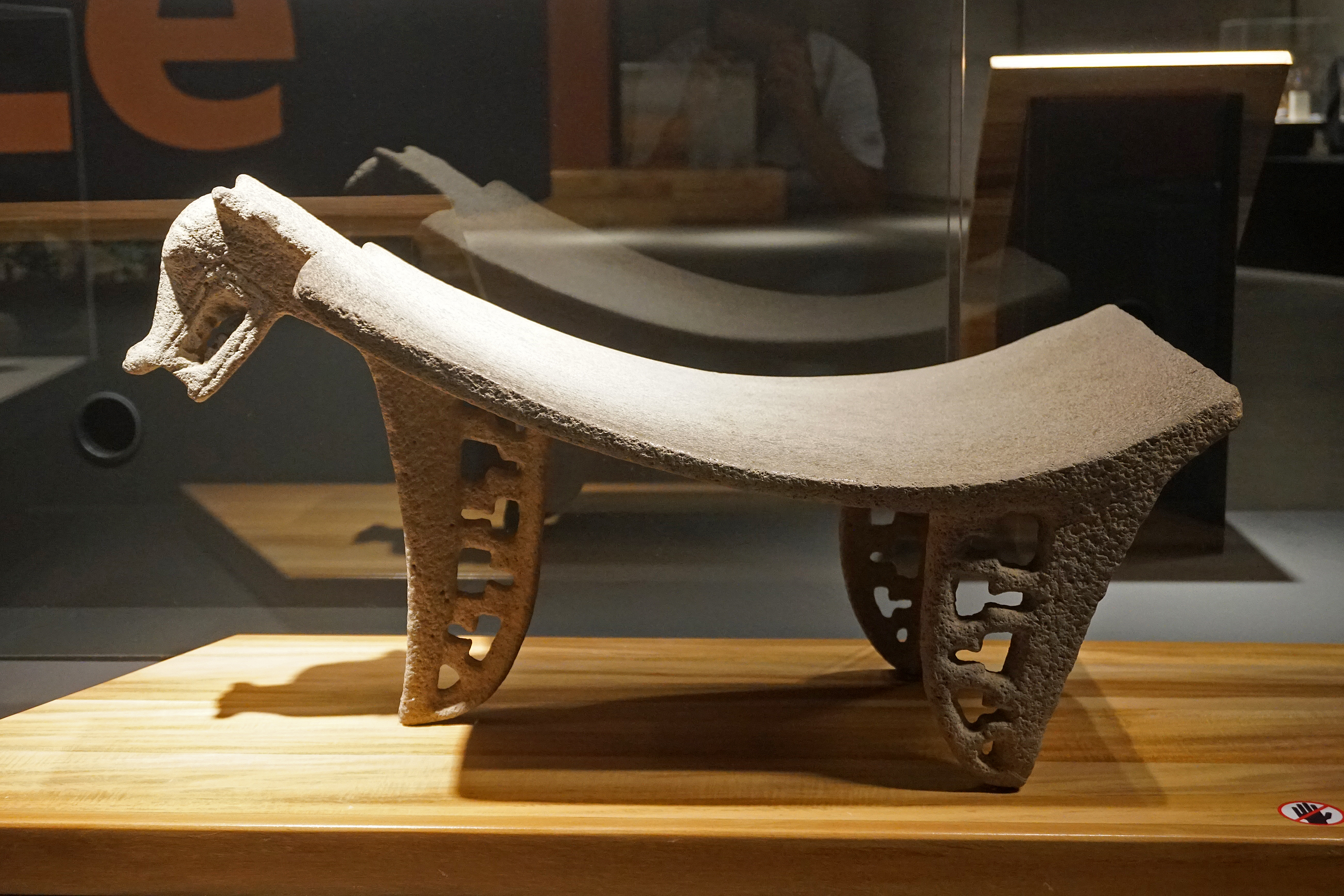
Metate

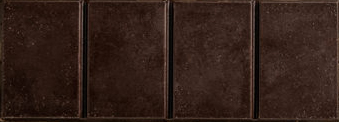
Modica chocolate traditional ingot bar

== History and characteristics ==
The specialty was introduced in the County of Modica by the Spaniards, during their domination in southern Italy. Their noble house was the most influential feudal power in southern Italy in the 16th century, during the Spanish domination of Sicily. Even today there is a similar form of preparation in Spain in the form of chocolate a la piedra; such varieties are also known in Mexico and Guatemala. According to Leonardo Sciascia, the recipe comes from Alicante; there were originally only two forms of preparation, with cinnamon and with vanilla. Before the product became an internationally known specialty, it was a holiday dessert in noble families. The Spaniards probably learned from the Aztecs the technique of processing cocoa beans through the use of metate; however, Modica chocolate uses sugar in addition to cocoa, an ingredient which would have been unavailable to the Aztecs.

Modica chocolate only became nationally known in 1999, when the chocolatier Franco Ruta published a newspaper article and subsequently appeared on the Maurizio Costanzo Show on television. Ruta was managing director of Antica Dolceria Bonajuto, founded in 1880 and called Caffè Roma until 1992. It has been in the hands of Franco Ruta's son Pierpaolo Ruta since 2016. At the same time as Ruta's television appearance, the popular police series Inspector Montalbano, which was partly filmed in Modica, was broadcast on Italian television. The comune (municipality) of Modica reinforced this publicity by hosting an annual chocolate fair ("Chocobarocco"). Within a short period of time there were 75 companies in Modica producing or selling chocolate. The chocolate industry thus became the city's largest employer.

In 2003, 20 local producers founded the Consorzio di Tutela del Cioccolato di Modica to protect Cioccolato di Modica as a protected geographical indication (PGI).

In 2017, the consortium also applied for protection at EU level as protected geographical indication for the same designation, which was granted in October 2018 with the Implementing Regulation (EU) 2018/1529.

The Antica Dolceria Bonajuto, which is considered to be the oldest still existing chocolate shop in the region, did not participate in the consortium. Rather, the Ruta family criticized the specification as insufficient and, after the publication of the PGI, produced chocolates as a provocation under the name cioccolato di un paese vicino a Ragusa (lit. 'chocolate from a village near Ragusa').

== Manufacturing ==
Modica chocolate is cold processed and has no cocoa butter added, at 45 degrees Celsius and without the conching process sugar does not dissolve; that's why it has a different texture. The finished chocolate therefore has a grainy, rough consistency, with the inclusion of small air bubbles; it crumbles when broken. When sold, the bars are slightly gray on the surface due to the cocoa butter that has been excreted. In the mouth, the chocolate unfolds an intense cocoa aroma. According to the age old Modica cold working process all the beneficial properties of cocoa are kept intact.

Ground cocoa, from which the cocoa butter has not been extracted, is heated to a maximum of 40 °C (104 °F). Sugar is added to the mass and possibly a spice such as cinnamon, vanilla, ginger, chili, ground almonds or nuts or grated citrus peel. The cocoa content is 45–90%. In traditional hand preparation, the mass was rolled out in a crescent-shaped, heated mold made of lava rock in several steps with rollers of different thicknesses until it had the desired consistency. Nowadays this is done by machines. The finished, warm chocolate mass is then poured into pewter molds in the form of thick bars.

Modica chocolate often has a white patina and tends to crumble. The cocoa butter blooming alters the traditional organoleptic properties of the product. Apart from the substances mentioned, Modica chocolate contains no other ingredients, in particular no milk, no butter, no vegetable fat and no lecithin.

== Events ==
From 2005 to 2008, Modica hosted Eurochocolate alongside Perugia. Since 2009 a festival named "Chocobarocco" is held every year in the city, organized together with the Fine Chocolate Organization.

== See also ==
- List of Italian desserts and pastries
- Types of chocolate
