= Modica =

Modica Muòrica (Sicilian)
- Comune
- Comune di Modica
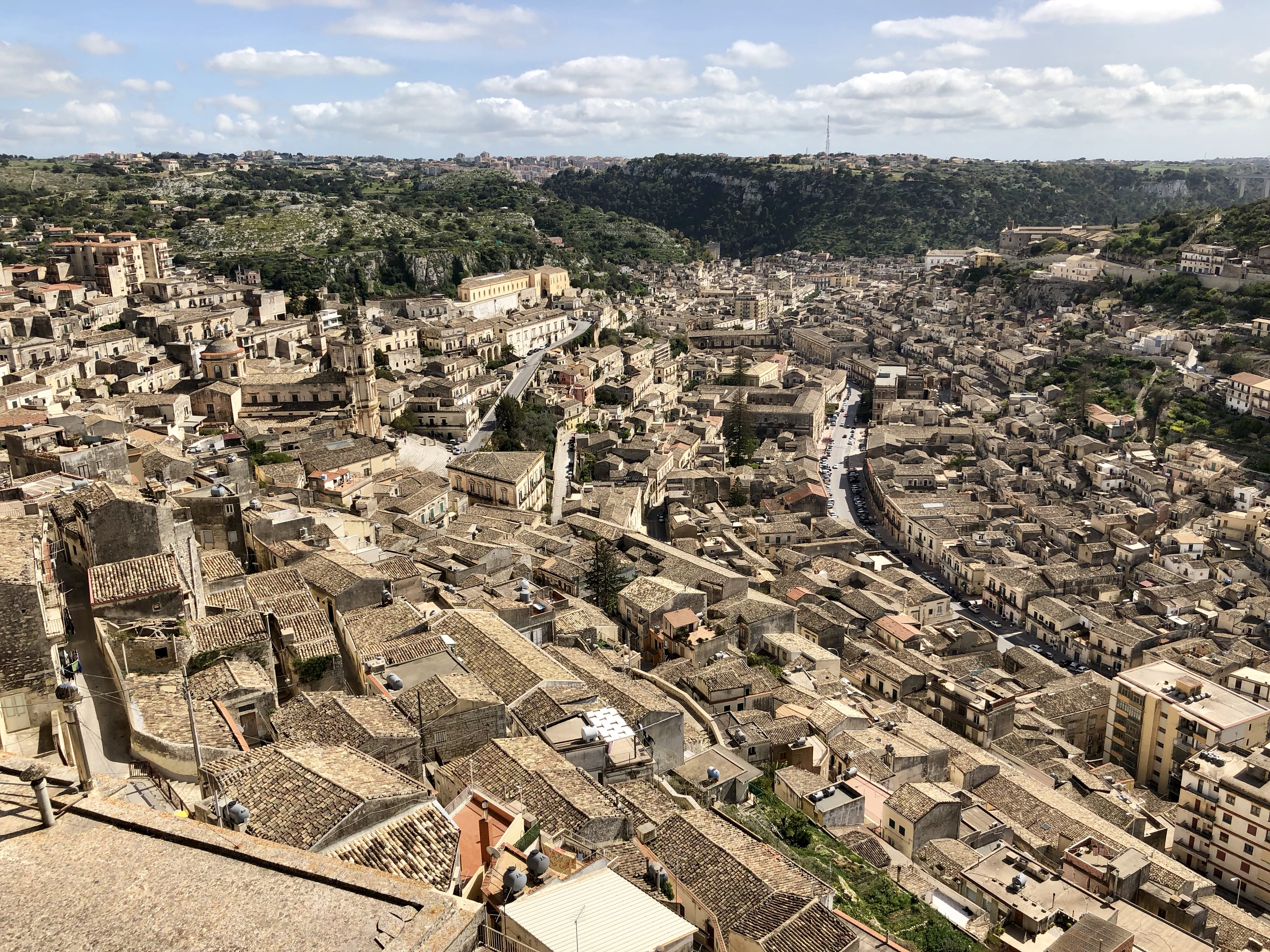

- Flag Coat of arms

- Location within Italy Location within Sicily
- Coordinates: 36°51′N 14°46′E
- Country: Italy
- Region: Sicily
- Province: Ragusa (RG)
- Frazioni: Frigintini, Marina di Modica

Government
  - Mayor: Maria Monisteri Caschetto

Area
  - Total: 292.37 km^{2} (112.88 sq mi)
- Elevation: 296 m (971 ft)

Population (2025)
  - Total: 53,413
  - Density: 182.69/km^{2} (473.16/sq mi)
- Demonym: Modicani
- Time zone: UTC+1 (CET)
  - Summer (DST): UTC+2 (CEST)
- Postal code: 97015
- Dialing code: 0932
- Patron saint: St. George
- Saint day: 23 April
- Website: Official website

UNESCO World Heritage Site
- Part of: Late Baroque Towns of the Val di Noto (South-Eastern Sicily)
- Criteria: Cultural: (i)(ii)(iv)(v)
- Reference: 1024rev-004
- Inscription: 2002 (26th Session)
- Area: 9 ha (970,000 sq ft)
- Buffer zone: 34 ha (3,700,000 sq ft)

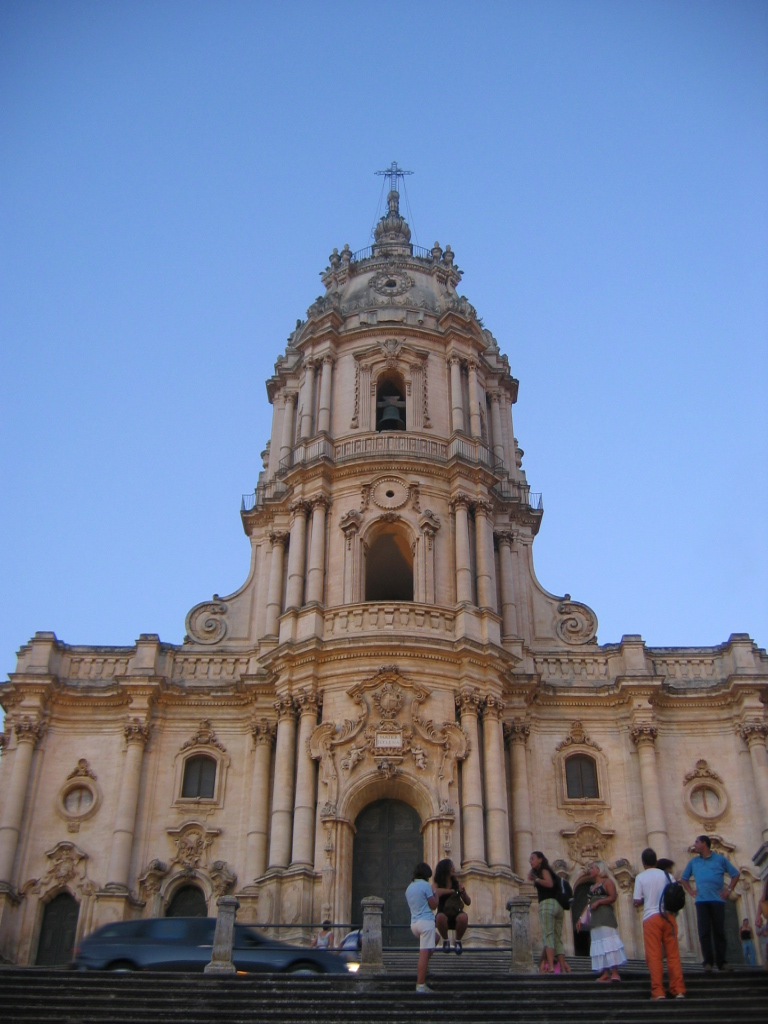
The Cathedral of San Giorgio.

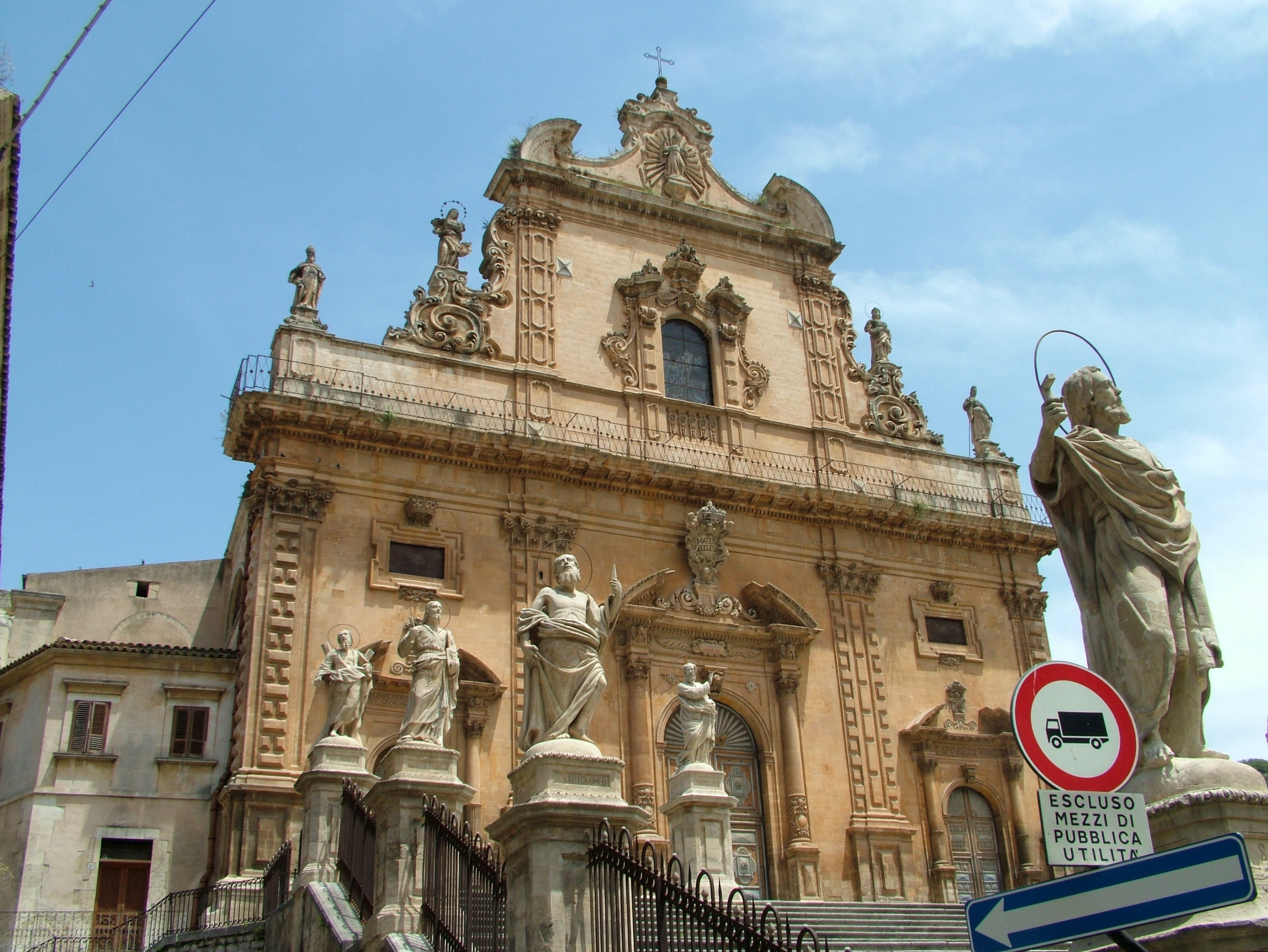
Façade of the Baroque church of San Pietro.

Modica (Italian: [ˈmɔːdika]; Sicilian: Muòrica) is a city and municipality (comune) in the Province of Ragusa, Sicily, southern Italy. The city is situated in the Hyblaean Mountains. It has 53,413 inhabitants.

Modica has neolithic origins and it represents the historical capital of the area which today almost corresponds to the Province of Ragusa. Until the 19th century it was the capital of a County that exercised such a wide political, economical and cultural influence to be counted among the most powerful feuds of the Mezzogiorno.

Rebuilt following the devastating earthquake of 1693, its architecture has been recognised as providing outstanding testimony to the genius and final flowering of Baroque art in Europe and, along with other towns in the Val di Noto, is part of UNESCO Heritage Sites in Italy.

== History ==
According to Thucydides, the city was founded in 1360 BC or 1031 BC and was inhabited by the Sicels in the 7th century BC. It was probably a dependency of Syracuse. Modica was occupied by the Romans after the battle of the Egadi islands against the Carthaginians in the Punic Wars 241 BC, together with Syracuse and all of Sicily. Modica became one of the thirty-five decuman ("spontaneously submitted") cities of the island and was oppressed by the praetor Verres. It became an independent municipium, and apparently a place of some consequence. The city is also mentioned among the inland towns of the island both by Pliny and Ptolemy; and though its name is not found in the Itineraries, it is again mentioned by the Geographer of Ravenna. Silius Italicus also includes it in his list of Sicilian cities, and immediately associates it with Netum (now Noto Antica), with which it was clearly in the same neighborhood. The southeast of Sicily and Modica (according to the German historian L. Hertling) was rapidly Christianized, as the diocese of Syracuse boasts an apostolic foundation by St. Paul in 61 AD. In 535, the Byzantine general Belisarius expelled the Ostrogoths and established for Justinian I the government of the East-Roman Empire (also known as the Byzantine Empire) and the already Greek-speaking population fixed their culture until the Latinization of the Normans in the 11th century.

In 845, Modica was captured by the Arabs during the Muslim conquest of Sicily. They referred to the city as Mudiqah. The year after its capture, the Arabs fortified its citadels and it subsequently prospered under their rule. In 1091 the conquest of Modica and the entire Val di Noto ended the long lasting war of the Normans, led by Roger of Hauteville, against the Arabs.

In 1296, Modica became the capital of an important county, which under the Chiaramonte family became a flourishing semi-independent state controlling the whole southern third of the island, with the right of a mint of its own and other privileges (see County of Modica).

On August 15, 1474, in the city of Modica, a violent attack took place against the Jewish population living in the Cartellone neighborhood, an area inhabited almost exclusively by Jews. A group of armed individuals entered the quarter, shouting "Long Live Mary and Death to the Jews". The attack resulted in the deaths of approximately 360 Jews.

Later, the earthquake of 1693 destroyed the entire Val di Noto, and to a slightly lesser extent in Modica. Annexed to Italy in 1860, Modica remained district capital until 1926, when it was included in the province of Ragusa.

== Landmarks ==
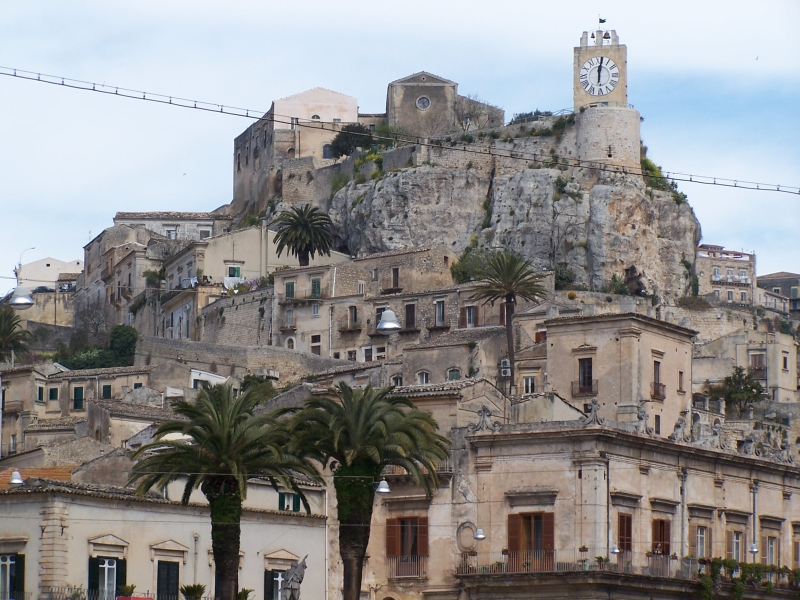
The Castle of the Counts of Modica.

Modica consists of two urban centres, "Modica Alta" (Upper Modica) and "Modica Bassa" (Lower Modica). The older upper part is perched on the rocky top of the southern Ibeli hill, the lower part is built on the lower slopes and valley below. The walk down from Modica Alta to Modica Bassa reveals vistas of the lower town and involves many steps; not many attempt the reverse journey on foot.

During the last century the city has extended and developed new suburbs which include Sacro Cuore (or "Sorda"), Monserrato, Idria, these are often referred to as Modern Modica; both old and modern quarters of the city are today joined by one of Europe's highest bridge, the Guerrieri bridge, 300 metres (980 ft) long.

Despite being ravaged by earthquakes in 1613 and 1693, and floods in 1833 and 1902, Modica has retained some of its world-renowned architecture in Sicily. Much of the city was rebuilt after the 1693 earthquake with imposing and conspicuous urban monuments in the Sicilian Baroque style.

San Giorgio is the cathedral, dedicated to St George. While the cathedral was rebuilt in a Baroque-style following the earthquake of 1693, like many other parts of the city its roots are in the Middle Ages. From the front of the cathedral a staircase of 300 steps leads down towards Modica Bassa.

San Pietro is another church, dedicated to St Peter, in Modica Bassa, featuring a principal façade crowned by a typical Sicilian Baroque belltower, 49 metres (161 ft) high.

Other sights include:

- Castello dei Conti (Castle)
- Chiesa del Carmine
- Church of St. Mary of Betlehem
- Garibaldi Theater
- Mercedari Palace -contains a museum and library

== Demographics ==
Historical population

Year	Pop.	±%
1861	32,492	—
1871	34,933	+7.5%
1881	43,254	+23.8%
1901	52,354	+21.0%
1911	59,932	+14.5%
1921	64,637	+7.9%
1931	49,703	−23.1%
1936	41,170	−17.2%

Year	Pop.	±%
1951	43,810	+6.4%
1961	44,050	+0.5%
1971	44,131	+0.2%
1981	47,537	+7.7%
1991	50,529	+6.3%
2001	52,639	+4.2%
2011	53,959	+2.5%
2021	53,554	−0.8%

Source: ISTAT

== Economy ==
The economy of the area was once principally agricultural, producing olives, carobs, legumes, cereals, and cattle. Modica is known for its unique chocolate, the cioccolato di Modica, produced with an ancient and original Aztec recipe. The city has now been joined by factories producing textiles, furniture and cars. Tourism is also an important industry to the area, since Modica became a UNESCO World Heritage Site in 2002.

== Culture ==
The eighteenth century saw Modica in the role of art and culture town, counting philosophers (Tommaso Campailla), poets (Girolama Grimaldi Lorefice), a school of medicine (Campailla, Gaspare Cannata, Michele Gallo, the Polara family) and literary academies among its inhabitants. In the nineteenth century, feudalism was abolished and Modica became a "bourgeois" town peopled by notables such as the writer and anthropologist Serafino Amabile Guastella, the agronomist Clemente Grimaldi, the musician Pietro Floridia and many painters, historians and other intellectuals.

Modica was also the birthplace of writer Salvatore Quasimodo, recipient of the Nobel Prize for Literature in 1959.

== See also ==
- County of Modica
- History of Sicily
- Sicilian Baroque
- Cioccolato di Modica
