= Sudecka Philharmonic =

The Sudeten Philharmonic (Polish: Filharmonia Sudecka) is an orchestra based in Wałbrzych, in southwestern Poland. In 2012 it recorded the two Violin Concertos by Maltese composer Karl Fiorini for a CD to be released by Metier Records (a Divine Art Recordings Group label) in early 2014. The recording was conducted by Bartosz Zurakowski.
