= Cadbury Heroes =

Confectionery

- Top view of a Cadbury Heroes tub
- Product type: Confectionery
- Current owner: Mondelez International
- Country: United Kingdom
- Introduced: 1999
- Related brands: List of Cadbury products
- Markets: United Kingdom, Ireland, South Africa, New Zealand and Australia

Cadbury Heroes (originally Cadbury's Miniature Heroes), known as Cadbury Favourites in Australia and New Zealand, is a brand of packaged confectionery containing a selection of miniature chocolate bars manufactured by British company Cadbury. They were introduced in 1999 as a response to Celebrations by rival Mars which were launched in 1997.

== History ==
Cadbury launched the new product in Britain as Cadbury's Miniature Heroes in September 1999, with the tag line The people magnet in a campaign designed by TBWA GGT Simons Palmer, and with sponsorship of Coronation Street, with the whole campaign costing £4.8 million. In 2002, the product name was just shortened to Cadbury Heroes in a campaign managed by TWBA.

In 2018, a Twitter campaign was started to remove the Eclair from the Heroes collection as it was normal sized and not a "miniature" as per the other chocolates in the selection. In 2022, due to production issues, some packs of Heroes contained two full size Twirls instead of the miniatures. Cadbury Heroes launched in South Africa in 2017.

The product also launched in Australia in 1999. In 2019, as a marketing campaign, a 10-metre tall Favourites box was built in Sydney. In 2023, Cadbury replaced Flake and Dream with Caramilk and Twirl.

In October 2025, Mondelez announced that they were trialling the replacement of plastic tubs with paper tubes. The tubes were being manufactured by packaging company D S Smith were to be only sold through Tesco stores, which would also see Éclairs replaced by Cadbury Flake. The plastic tubs would continue to contain Éclairs.

== Flavours ==
=== Britain, Ireland and Isle of Man ===
The following list are the chocolate bars currently included in Cadbury Heroes as sold in Britain, Ireland and the Isle of Man:

- Fudge
- Dairy Milk Caramel
- Dairy Milk
- Wispa (Added in 2015)
- Twirl
- Creme Egg Twisted (Added in 2009)
- Eclair (Added in 2008)
- Double Decker (Known as "Dinky Decker", added in 2019)
- Crunchie (Originally as Crunchie Bite. Removed in 2008 but re-added in 2019 as Crunchie Bits)

In 2019, Mondelez commissioned YouGov to poll the British public to find out the country's favourite Cadbury Heroes for its 20th anniversary. The top spot was shared at 13% between Crunchie and Twirl.

==== Discontinued ====
- Bournville (Added in 2008, removed in 2013)
- Dairy Milk Whole Nut (Dairy Milk with added hazelnut in the centre. Added in 2002, removed in 2008)
- Dream (Added in 2002, Removed in 2008)
- Fuse (Removed in 2004)
- Picnic (Removed in 2007)
- Time Out (Removed in 2007)
- Toblerone (Added for Christmas 2013, 2014 and 2015)
- Nuts About Caramel (Cadbury's Caramel with added hazelnut in the centre. Removed in early-2000's)

=== South Africa ===
The following are chocolate bars included in Cadbury Heroes in South Africa:

- Dairy Milk
- Chomp
- Lunch Bar
- Flake
- Dairy Milk Top Deck

=== Australia and New Zealand ===
Cadbury Favourites is the antipodean name for Cadbury Heroes, but contains it own unique mix of miniature chocolate bars and is sold in Australia and New Zealand. The following list are the chocolate bars included in Cadbury Favourites:

- Caramilk (Added in 2023)
- Cherry Ripe
- Crunchie
- Dairy Milk
- Fry's Turkish Delight
- Moro
- Twirl (Added in 2023)
- Old Gold
- Picnic

A 2021 poll conducted by news.com.au determined that Australia's favourite flavour in the box was Fry's Turkish Delight, followed by Cherry Ripe.

Discontinued

- Dream (Removed in 2023)
- Flake (Removed in 2023)

==== Editions ====
- Dark chocolate edition, launched in 2019.
- Easter edition, which contains small Cadbury Creme Eggs.
- Kiwiana, which contains chocolate fish.
