= List of Cadbury brands =

Cadbury is the second largest confectionery company globally after Mars, Incorporated and is a subsidiary of American company Mondelēz International. Cadbury has been manufacturing chocolate products since 1824, they are widely distributed and sold in many countries, the main markets being the United Kingdom and Isle of Man, Ireland, Canada, India, Australia, New Zealand, South Africa and the United States. The list here includes products made under Cadbury owned brands, including J. S. Fry and Sons and Pascall, while some of the following products are made under licence using the Cadbury name, including the US, where Hershey has the license to manufacture Cadbury goods.

== Current products ==
Product name	Product type	Countries sold in (varies on variations)	Variations	Date first produced	References				
Product name	Product type	Countries sold in (varies on variations)	Variations	Date first produced	References	5 Star	Caramel and nougat mix covered with milk chocolate	India; Indonesia; Malaysia; Brazil; South Africa; Philippines; Egypt	1969
Animals with Freddo	Half covered chocolate Biscuit	United Kingdom; Ireland							
Boost	Chocolate bar	United Kingdom; Ireland(Known as Moro Bar); Australia; New Zealand; South Africa	Boost Duo; Boost Layers	1985					
Bournville	Chocolate bar, block, bags and beverage	United Kingdom; Ireland; South Africa; India; Pakistan	Bournville Cocoa; Bournville Old Jamaica; Bournville Orange; Bournville Giant Buttons; Bournville Classic Dark Chocolate with Mint; Bournville Almond; Bournville Hazelnut; Bournville Raisin & Nut; Bournville Rich Cocoa; Bournville Cranberry	1908					
Bournvita	Beverage	United Kingdom; United States; Canada; India; Nepal; Bangladesh; Nigeria; Benin; Togo; Pakistan							
Brunch	Chocolate bar	United Kingdom; Ireland	Choc Chip; Peanut; Raisin; Bournville Choc Chip						
Buzz Bar	Chocolate bar	New Zealand							
Cadbury Almendras	Chocolate bar	Argentina							
Cadbury Cake Bars	Cake		Caramel; Milk Chocolate						
Cadbury Celebrations	Chocolate bar	United Kingdom; Australia; New Zealand; India	Assortment box						
Cadbury Creme Egg	Chocolate confection in Egg shape	United Kingdom; Ireland; Australia; New Zealand; Canada; United States	Creme Egg; White Creme Egg; Oreo Egg; Caramel Egg	1963					
Cadbury Dairy Milk	Chocolate bar, block, bags, cake, biscuits, desserts and ice-cream	United Kingdom; Ireland; Australia; New Zealand; South Africa; United States; Canada; India; China; Sri Lanka; Pakistan; Philippines; Indonesia; Kazakhstan; Bangladesh	Dairy Milk 5Star; Dairy Milk 30% Less Sugar; Dairy Milk Astros; Dairy Milk Baubles; Dairy Milk Caramello Baubles; Dairy Milk Peppermint Baubles; Dairy Milk Big Taste Oreo Crunch; Dairy Milk Big Taste Triple Choc; Dairy Milk Biscuit; Dairy Milk Black Forest; Dairy Milk Boysenberry Ripple; Dairy Milk Breakaway; Dairy Milk Breakaway Mint; Dairy Milk Brownie Bites; Dairy Milk Bubbly; Dairy Milk Bubbly Mint; Dairy Milk Bubbly Oreo; Dairy Milk Bubbly Top Deck; Dairy Milk Bunny; Dairy Milk Bunny Milk Clinker; Dairy Milk Buttons; Dairy Milk Buttons Dessert; Dairy Milk Buttons Mint; Dairy Milk Buttons Orange; Dairy Milk Buttons Twisted; Dairy Milk Caramel; Dairy Milk Caramel Flapjack Bites; Dairy Milk Caramel Mini Cookies; Dairy Milk Caramel Nibbles; Dairy Milk Caramello; Dairy Milk Caramilk; Dairy Milk Caramilk Top Deck; Dairy Milk Cashew Nut; Dairy Milk Cashew & Coconut; Dairy Milk Chocolate Maker's Mint Chip; Dairy Milk Chocolate Mousse; Dairy Milk Cluster Bites; Dairy Milk Coconut Rough milk chocolate bar; Dairy Milk Coins; Dairy Milk Crackle; Dairy Milk Crunchie Bits; Dairy Milk Daim; Dairy Milk Duo; Dairy Milk Fingers; Dairy Milk Freddo; Dairy Milk Freddo Caramel; Dairy Milk Freddo Milky Top; Dairy Milk Fruit & Nut; Dairy Milk Fruitier & Nuttier Trail Mix; Dairy Milk Fruitier & Nuttier Orangier Trail Mix; Dairy Milk Giant Buttons; Dairy Milk Gingerbread Biscuit; Dairy Milk Golden Crisp; Dairy Milk Hazelnut; Dairy Milk Humpty Dumpty; Dairy Milk Inventor Bars Banoffee Nut Crumble; Dairy Milk Inventor Bars Fizzing Cherry; Dairy Milk Inventor Bars No Frowny Brownie; Dairy Milk Little Bar; Dairy Milk Luxury Ice Creams; Dairy Milk Madbury Tangy Mango; Dairy Milk Madbury Nutty Kulfi; Dairy Milk Marble Chocolate Bar; Dairy Milk Marvellous Creations Jelly Popping Candy; Dairy Milk Marvellous Creations Pascall Lolly; Dairy Milk Marvellous Creations Rocky Road; Dairy Milk Chocolate milk chocolate roll; Dairy Milk Mixed Chunks; Dairy Milk More with Mixed Roast Nuts; Dairy Milk More with Nuts & Salted Toffee; Dairy Milk Mystery Bar; Dairy Milk Orange; Dairy Milk Oreo; Dairy Milk with Pascall Clinkers Chocolate; Dairy Milk Peppermint; Dairy Milk Pots of Joy; Dairy Milk Pots of Joy Caramel; Dairy Milk Pots of Joy Chocolate Brownie; Dairy Milk Pots of Joy Orange; Dairy Milk Roast Almond; Dairy Milk Rum & Raisin; Dairy Milk Salted Caramel; Dairy Milk Slices Crackle; Dairy Milk Slices Vanilla Passionfruit; Cadbury Dairy Milk Snack; Dairy Milk Strawberry Block; Dairy Milk Tiffin; Dairy Milk Top Deck; Dairy Milk Top Deck Mint; Dairy Milk Tropical Pineapple; Dairy Milk Turkish Delight; Dairy Milk Turkish; Dairy Milk Whole Nut	1905					
Cadbury Chocolate Cake Mix	Cake mix		Warm Brownie Mix; Chocolate Cookie Mix						
Cadbury Chocolate Spread	Spread								
Cadbury Chocolate Flavour Icing	Frosting								
Cadbury Drinking Hot Chocolate	Beverage	United Kingdom; Ireland							
Cadbury Eclairs	Milk chocolate encased in a chewy caramel	United Kingdom; Ireland; Australia; Kenya; Hong Kong; South Africa; Pakistan		1965					
Cadbury Glow	Box	India							
Cadbury Intense	Chocolate bar	Argentina							
Cadbury Magical Elves		Australia; New Zealand	Chocolate bar	2007					
Cadbury Old Gold	Chocolate bar	Australia; New Zealand	Old Gold Dark Chocolate Slices Mint Creme; Old Gold Dark Chocolate Coated Peanut & Honeycomb; Old Gold Dark Chocolate Peanut Brittle; Old Gold More with Fruit N Nut; Old Gold Dark Chocolate Old Jamaica Rum N Raisin; Old Gold Dark Chocolate Coated Almonds; Old Gold Fruit n Nut Dark Chocolate Coated Bites; Old Gold Dark Chocolate Orange; Old Gold Dark Chocolate Peppermint; Old Gold Dark Chocolate Cherry Ripe; Old Gold Dark Chocolate Roast Almond; Old Gold Dark Chocolate 70% Cocoa	1916					
Cadbury P.S. Milk Chocolate	Bars	South Africa	P.S. Caramilk						
Cadbury Pasas	Chocolate bar	Argentina							
Cadbury Roses	Boxed or bagged wrapped chocolates	United Kingdom; Ireland; Australia		1938					
Cadbury Silk Pralines	Box	India							
Cadbury Temptation Almond Treat	Chocolate bar	India	Cadbury Temptation Rum and Raisin						
Cadbury Tres Sueños	Chocolate bar	Argentina							
Cadbury White	Block	United Kingdom; Ireland	Cadbury White Buttons						
Cadbury Yoghurt Fruitilla	Chocolate bar	Argentina							
Caramello Koala		Australia		1966					
Caramilk	Chocolate bar	United Kingdom; Ireland; Canada; Australia	1968						
Cherry Ripe	Chocolate bar	Australia; New Zealand		1924					
Chomp	Chocolate bar	United Kingdom; Ireland; Australia; New Zealand; South Africa		1970					
Chixo	Chocolate bar	South Africa							
Crispy Crunch	Chocolate Bar	Canada							
Crunchie	Chocolate bar and bags	United Kingdom; Ireland; Jordan; Canada; Australia; New Zealand; South Africa; India	Crunchie Rocks; Crunchie Treat Size; Crunchie Sharepack	1929					
Curly Wurly	Chocolate bar and bags	United Kingdom; Ireland; Australia; New Zealand	Curly Wurly Squirlies	1970					
Darkmilk	Chocolate bar, block, bags and ice creams	United Kingdom; Australia; Canada	Darkmilk Crunchy Cocoa Pieces; Darkmilk Roasted Almond; Darkmilk Salted Caramel; Darkmilk Giant Buttons; Dark Milk Crunchy Salted Caramel; Dark Milk Roasted & Caramelised Hazelnuts; Dark Milk Sweet Zingy Raspberry; Dark Milk Crunchy Salted Caramel Pieces; Dark Milk Roasted & Caramelized Hazelnut	2017					
Double Decker	Chocolate bar and bags	United Kingdom; Ireland; Australia	Double Decker Duo; Dinky Deckers	1976					
Favourites	Boxed/tinned confectionery	Australia; New Zealand	Favourites Party Edition; Favourites Dark Edition	1999					
Flake	Chocolate bar, cake, ice cream and dessert	United Kingdom; Ireland; Australia; New Zealand; South Africa; Egypt	Dipped Flake; Flake 99 Ice Cream Cone; Flake Chocolate Dessert; Flake Celebration Cake	1930					
Fry's Chocolate Cream	Chocolate bar	United Kingdom	Fry's Orange Cream; Fry's Peppermint Cream; Fry's Raspberry Cream	1866					
Fry's Turkish Delight	Chocolate bar	United Kingdom; Australia		1914					
Fudge	Chocolate bar and bags	United Kingdom; Ireland	Fudge Minis; Fudge Treat Size	1938					
Fuse	Chocolate bar	India		1996					
Heroes	Boxed/tinned confectionery and dessert	United Kingdom; Ireland		1999					
Neilson Jersey Milk	Chocolate bar	Canada							
Lunch Bar		South Africa		1965					
Milk Tray	Boxed chocolates	Australia; Canada; Ireland; New Zealand; South Africa; United Kingdom		1915					
Mini Eggs	Milk chocolate encased in a thin coating of hard candy egg shaped shell	United Kingdom; Ireland; Australia; New Zealand; United States	Mini Eggs; Micro Mini Eggs; Shimmer Mini Eggs; Popping Mini Eggs; Dark Mini Eggs; White Mini Eggs; Orange Mini Eggs; Mini Egg Bar	1967					
Mini Fingers	Chocolate coated Biscuit	United Kingdom; Ireland							
Mini Rolls	Miniature chocolate covered Swiss roll	United Kingdom; Ireland	Mini Roll Raspberry						
Monster Gems	Bag	India							
Moro	Chocolate bar	Australia; New Zealand							
Mr. Big	Chocolate bar	Canada							
Nutties	Bag	India							
Pascall Clinkers	Bag	Australia							
Pascall Caramels	Bag	Australia							
Perk	Chocolate bar, Bags	India	Perk Bites						
Picnic	Chocolate bar and bags	Australia; Canada; New Zealand; United States; India; Ireland; United Kingdom	Picnic Bites	1950					
Shots	Bag	India							
Snack	Chocolate bar	United Kingdom; Ireland	Snack Sandwich	1950s					
Snacker Original	Bar	South Africa	Snacker Fruit						
Starbar	Chocolate bar	United Kingdom; Ireland		1976					
Time Out Wafer	Chocolate bar	United Kingdom; Ireland		1992					
Top Deck	Bar	United Kingdom		Originally 1993. Re-launched 2024.					
Tumbles Shortcake	Bag	South Africa	Tumbles Raisin						
Twirl	Chocolate bar	United Kingdom; Ireland; Australia; New Zealand	Twirl Orange; Twirl Mint; Twirl Bites; Twirl Honeycomb Sundae; Twirl Strawberry; Twirl Caramilk	1985					
Wispa	Chocolate bar, desserts and bags	United Kingdom; Ireland	Wispa Gold; Wispa Bites	1981					
Wunderbar	Chocolate bar	Canada; Germany							
Zip	Chocolate bar	Malaysia							

== Companies and brands operated or formerly operated by Cadbury ==
- Barratt & Co 1989 - 2008
- Bassett's 1989–2012
- Carambar 1998-2012
- Chocolat Poulain 1998-2012
- J. S. Fry & Sons 1919-
- Hartley-Chivers 1969–1986
- Hollywood 2000-2012
- Kenco 1969-1986
- Kiss Cool 2000-2012
- Kréma 2000-2012
- La Pie qui Chante 1998-2012
- La Vosgienne 2000-2012
- MacRobertson's 1967–2002
- Malabar 2000-2012
- Maynards 1989–2012
- Michoko 1998-2012
- James Pascall 1964-
- Peter Paul Candy Manufacturing Company 1978–1988
- Schweppes 1969–2008
- Tonigum 2000-2012
- Trebor 1989–2012
- Typhoo 1969-1986
- E. Wedel 1999-2010

== Discontinued products: UK, Ireland and Isle of Man ==
=== Bars and Blocks ===
- Almond
- Almond Dessert Chocolate
- Amazin' Raisin
- Apple Jack
- Apricot & Almond
- Autumn Nuts
- Aztec
- Aztec 2000
- Bar Noir
- Bar Six
- Big One
- Bitter Chocolate
- Black Forest
- Blended Chocolate
- Bonus
- Boost Coconut
- Boost + Protein
- Boost + Protein Peanut
- Boost Peanut
- Boost with Guarana
- Border Creme
- Border Creme Egg
- Bournville Deeply Dark
- Bournville Deeply Dark Coffee
- Bournville Mint Crisp
- Bournville Roasted Almond
- Brandy Snap
- Brazil Nut
- Brunch Cranberry & Orange
- Brunch Hazelnut
- Butterscotch Brittle
- California Dreaming
- Cappuccino
- Caramello
- Caramel Double Chocolate Dream
- Caramel Dark Chocolate Mint
- Caramel with a hint of Mint
- Carbohydrate Modified Chocolate
- Cheesy Criss Cross
- Chocolate Lollipop Wenlock and Mandeville Mascots
- Chocolate Mascots Wenlock and Mandeville
- Chocolate Truffle
- Classic
- Classics Golden Crisp
- Classics Royal Mint
- Classics Tiffin
- Classics Turkish
- Classic Selection Golden Crisp
- Classic Selection Ginger
- Classic Selection Orange & Walnut
- Classic Selection Sliced Brazil
- Classic Selection Tropical Fruit
- Cookies & Cream
- Country Style
- Coffee Break
- Coffee Creme
- Coffee Dessert
- Coffee & Truffle Milk Block
- Coffee & Walnut
- Craze
- Creme Bear
- Creme Egg Twisted
- Crispello Double Choc
- Crispello Vanilla Velvet
- Crispy Byte
- Crunchie Blast
- Crunchie Bubbly
- Crunchie Explosion
- Crunchie Lemonade
- Crunchie Mint
- Crunchie Orange
- Crunchie Splash of Bubbly
- Crunchie Tango
- Curly Wurly Cool Orange
- Dairy Milk Apricot Crumble Crunch
- Dairy Milk Bar of Plenty Berry Fruit & Vanilla Shortcake
- Dairy Milk Bar of Plenty Honey Flakes & Caramelised Pecans
- Dairy Milk Bar of Plenty Roast Hazelnut & Honey Roast Cashews
- Dairy Milk Bar of Plenty Toffee Apple
- Dairy Milk Banoffee Nut Crumble
- Dairy Milk Bliss
- Dairy Milk Bliss Dreamy Chocolate Truffle
- Dairy Milk Bliss Irresistible Hazelnut Truffle
- Dairy Milk Bliss Scrumptious Toffee Flavour Truffle
- Dairy Milk Bronzed Creme Crunch
- Dairy Milk Bubbly Mini
- Dairy Milk Chips Ahoy
- Dairy Milk Cranberry and Granola
- Dairy Milk Crispies
- Dairy Milk Double Choc
- Dairy Milk Fizzing Cherry
- Dairy Milk Fruit & Nut Bar & a Half
- Dairy Milk Golden Biscuit Crunch
- Dairy Milk Green & Gold
- Dairy Milk Hoppy Bunny
- Dairy Milk Lu
- Dairy Milk Madbury Choco-Latte
- Dairy Milk Madbury Coconutty
- Dairy Milk Madbury Out of The Blueberry
- Dairy Milk Madbury Raspberry Shortcake
- Dairy Milk Madbury Simply The Zest
- Dairy Milk Magical Elves
- Dairy Milk Marvellous Creations Banana Caramel Crisp
- Dairy Milk Marvellous Creations Cola Prezel Honeycomb
- Dairy Milk Marvellous Creations Cookie Nut Crunch
- Dairy Milk Marvellous Creations Rocky Mallow Road
- Dairy Milk Marvellous Smashables Jelly Popping Candy
- Dairy Milk Marvellous Smashables Rocky Mallow Road
- Dairy Milk Medley Dark Chocolate, Hazelnuts and Raspberry Pieces
- Dairy Milk Miniatures
- Dairy Milk Mint Chips
- Dairy Milk Mint Crisp
- Dairy Milk Mystery Bar No.1 Rhubarb and Custard
- Dairy Milk Mystery Bar No.2 Blue Raspberry Slush
- Dairy Milk Lu
- Dairy Milk No Frownie Brownie
- Dairy Milk Nuts for Gold
- Dairy Milk Nutty Caramel
- Dairy Milk Oat Crunch
- Dairy Milk Orange Chips
- Dairy Milk Puddles Smooth Hazelnut
- Dairy Milk Puddles Smooth Mint
- Dairy Milk Quick
- Dairy Milk Ritz
- Dairy Milk Shortcake Biscuit
- Dairy Milk Silvery Creme
- Dairy Milk Snowy Delight
- Dairy Milk Strawberries & Creme
- Dairy Milk Toffee Popcorn
- Dairy Milk Tropical Pineapple
- Dairy Milk Wafer
- Dipped Flake
- Double Fudge Dream
- Dream
- Dream with Real Strawberries
- Extra
- Filled Block Peppermint
- Filled Block Vanilla Creme
- Filled Block Ginger Delight
- Filled Block Orange Creme
- Filled Block Caramello
- Filled Block Marzipan
- Filled Block Turkish Delight
- Filled Block Coffee & Truffle
- Filled Block Truffle Dark
- Filled Block Truffle Milk
- Filled Block Coffee Creme
- Fine Dessert Chocolate
- Flake Allure
- Flake Dark
- Flake Dipped
- Flake Praline
- Flake Snow
- Fruit
- Fruit Sundae
- Fruit & Nut Blended Chocolate
- Fruit & Nut Bournville
- Fry's Border Creme Egg
- Fry's Blended Chocolate
- Fry's Bristol Chocolate
- Fry's Chocolate Marshmallow
- Fry's Chocolate Sandwich - Double Milk
- Fry's Cokernut
- Fry's Crunchie
- Fry's Grapefruit Cream
- Fry's Jersey Cream
- Fry's Judy Bar
- Fry's Macaroon
- Fry's Maltegg
- Fry's Marzipan
- Fry's Medley
- Fry's Milk Chocolate
- Fry's Milk Chocolate Cream Egg
- Fry's Milk Sandwich
- Fry's Ripple
- Fry's Scorched Almond
- Fry's Super Mousse
- Fry's Swing
- Fry's Tiffin
- Fry's Valencia
- Fry's Whole Nut Milk Chocolate
- Furry Friend
- Fuse
- Gambit
- Ginger Biscuit
- Go
- Golden Crisp
- Gold Mine
- Grand Seville
- Hazel in Sweet Disguises
- Highlights
- Ice Breaker
- Laughs
- Lemon
- Lime
- Lime Tray Block
- Lunch Chocolate
- Mandarin
- Marble
- Marshmallow
- Marzipan
- Marzipan Walnut
- Mild Dessert Chocolate
- Milk Almond Nougat
- Milk Coffee Creme Stick
- Milk Creme Strawberry
- Milk Marshmallow
- Milk Tray Bar
- Mint Crisp
- Mis-shapes
- Monster Bar
- Nobble
- Noisette
- Nunch
- Nut Crisp
- Nuts About Caramel
- Nuts About Caramel Double Chocolate
- Old Jamaica
- Orange Creme
- Oranges & Lemons
- Peanut Sub
- Peppermint
- Peppermint Pattie
- Pineapple
- Plain Choice
- Plain Diabetic Chocolate
- Plain Flake
- Plain Six
- Puds Minis
- Raspberry
- Ration Chocolate
- Roasted Almond
- Roobarb
- Royal Mint
- Ruffle
- Rum & Butter
- Rumba
- Sultana
- Sandwich Plain Chocolate
- Shortcake Snack
- Shush
- Silk
- Skippy
- Slides Caramels
- Slides Peppermint
- Slides Turkish Delight
- Sliced Nut
- Smiley
- Smooth Mint Creme
- Snack Raisin Cereal Bar
- Snack Wafer
- Snack 7 Finger
- Soccerbar
- Special Recipe
- Spectacular 7
- Spice Girls
- Spira / Dairy Milk Spira
- Spots V Stripes Challenge Bar
- Spots V Stripes The Big Race
- Star Wars Episode I
- Strawberry
- Strawberry Creme
- Strawberry Tray Block
- Sultana
- Summer Fruits
- Sunfruits Blackcurrant
- Super Mousse
- Swiss Chalet
- Tangerine
- Taz
- The Shoe People
- The Wombles
- Three Wishes
- Ticket
- Time Out
- Time Out Chunky
- Time Out Mint Chunky
- Time Out Orange
- Toffee
- Toffee Tray
- Touch Down
- Truffle with Orange Liqueur Flavour
- Truffle Rum Flavour
- Turkish
- Turkish Delight
- Vanilla & Cream
- Velvet Blend
- Velvet Mint
- Wacky Races
- Walnut
- Walnut & Orange
- Welcome
- Westlife
- Whipped Creme Caramel
- Whipped Creme Walnut
- Whistler
- White Christmas
- Whole Fruit
- Whole Hazels
- Whole Nut Blended Chocolate
- Wildlife Bar
- Wishes
- Wispa Bite
- Wispaccino
- Wispa Mint
- Wispa Orange
- Wispa Strawberry
- Wriggler
- Yuletide
- Zousse Banana
- Zousse Orange
- Zousse Strawberry

=== Bags, Boxes and Rolls ===
- Allora
- Almond Whirls
- Amethyst Assortment
- Animal Playmates
- Animals Bites
- Astros
- Biarritz
- Bizarre
- Black Cat
- Bond Street
- Bournville Selection
- Choc’ Full of Clusters
- Choc’ Full of Peanuts
- Choc’ Full of Raisins
- Chocolate Dainty Creams
- Chocolate Éclairs Roll
- Crispello Double Choc
- Crispello Vanilla Velvet
- Crunchie Nuggets
- Crunchums
- Contrast
- Dairy Milk Buttons Multipack
- Dairy Milk Chocos
- Dairy Milk Melts Deliciously Dark
- Dairy Milk Melts Heavenly Praline
- Dairy Milk Melts Velvety Milk
- Dairy Milk Mix-Ups with Maynard's
- Dairy Milk Mix-Ups with Oreo
- Dairy Milk Pebbles
- Dairy Milk Tasters
- Dairy Milk Variety
- Darkness Chocolates
- Dream Snow Bites
- Éclairs Velvet Coffee Flavour
- Fruit & Nut Tasters
- Gems
- Golden Cups
- Hazel Whirls
- Inspirations Chocolates
- King Edward Chocolates
- King George Chocolates
- Koko Milk Chocolate Truffles
- Koko Truffle Collection
- Lucky Numbers
- Marlborough
- Mayfair Chocolates
- Milk Chocolate Caramels
- Miniature Heroes
- Nuts Chocolates
- Pascall Clearmints
- Pascall Fruit Bon Bons
- Pascall Marshmallows
- Popcorn
- Pretzels
- Princess Chocolates
- Roses Caramel Barrel
- Roses Luxury
- Roses Strawberry Dream
- Selected
- Shots
- Snack Shots
- Snaps Caramel Crunch
- Snaps Hazelnut
- Snaps Milk Chocolate
- Snaps Mint
- Snaps Orange
- Something Special Chocolates
- Spice Collection
- Strawberry Buttons
- Strollers
- Stuart Chocolates
- Thank You Pralines
- Toffee Buttons
- Tops Assorted Fruits
- Tops Liquorice
- Tops Mint
- Tribute
- Trillions
- Twenties
- Vogue
- Wicked
- With Love Pralines
- Whole Nut Tasters

=== Beverages ===
- Bournvita
- Breakfast Cocoa
- Chocolate Break
- Chocolate Milk
- Cocoa Essence
- Cream Liqueur
- Cup Chocolate
- Dietetic Cocoa
- Double Strength Red Label Drinking Chocolate
- Fine Brew Instant Tea
- Gem Chocolate Powder
- Highlights Caramel
- Highlights Chocolate Mocha
- Highlights Dark Chocolate
- Highlights Hazelnut
- Highlights Mint
- Highlights Orange
- Hot Choc Chunks
- Instant Break
- Marvel
- Pearl Cocoa
- Suprema
- Top Choc Vending

=== Desserts ===
- Almond Slices
- Appletree Dried Apple Flavour
- Appletree Bilberry and Dried Apple Flavour
- Appletree Lemon and Dried Apple Flavour
- Appletree Orange and Dried Apple Flavour
- Apple Twins
- Apricot Pie
- Assorted Tarts
- Banana Mini Rolls
- Brazilian Gateau
- Butter Sponge Lemon
- Butter Sponge Vanillia
- Cola Mini Rolls
- Dairy Milk Caramel Nibbles Twin Pot
- Dairy Milk Crunchie Twin Pot
- Dairy Milk Freddo Faces Twin Pot
- Dairy Milk Marvellous Mix-Ups Banana Sour Fudge Twin Pot
- Dairy Milk Marvellous Mix-Ups Cherry Cola Fizz Twin Pot
- Dairy Milk Marvellous Mix-Ups Fruity Jelly Popping Candy Twin Pot
- Dairy Milk Mint Chips Twin Pot
- Dairy Milk Pebbles Twin Pot
- Dairy Milk Shortcake Biscuit Twin Pot
- Double Chocolate Mini Rolls
- Caramel Cake Bites
- Caramel Mini Rolls
- Caramel Mousse
- Caramel Trifle
- Cherry & Vanilla Mini Rolls
- Cherry Iced Gateau
- Chillo
- Choc Chip Cake Bites
- Chocolate Chaos Pot
- Chocolate Cheesecake Flake
- Chocolate House Cake
- Chocolate House Fancies
- Chocolate Orange Mini Rolls
- Clusters Twin Pot
- Coffee Gateau
- Custard Dessert Mix with Caramel Topping
- Delights
- Fresca
- Fruit & Nut Cake Bars
- Fudge Cake Bars
- Fudge Cake Bites
- Fudge Diamonds
- Gooseberry Pie
- Hazelnut Mini Rolls
- Highlights Cake Bars Toffee
- Hot Cakes Butterscotch
- Hot Cakes Double Choc
- Hot Caramel Pudding
- Hot Chocolate Orange Pudding
- Hot Chocolate Pudding
- Ice Caps Lemon
- Ice Caps Raspberry
- Iced Coffee Gateau
- Iced Gateau
- Layers of Joy Black Forest
- Layers of Joy Caramellionaire
- Lemon Iced Gateau
- Lemon Meringue Pie
- Lemon Ring
- Light Mousse
- Light Trifle
- Milk Chocolate Jaffa Cake Bars
- Milk Chocolate Mint Cake Bars
- Mini Bakes Chocolate Brownie
- Mini Mini Rolls
- Mini-Sponges Coffee
- Mini-Sponges Raspberry & Vanillia
- Mint Choc Flavour Mini Rolls
- Mint Mousse
- Orange Mousse
- Raspberry Ripple Flavour Mini Rolls
- Rich Genoa Cake
- Ring Ding Swiss Roll Slice
- Roses Coffee Escape Cake Bars
- Roses Orange Creme Cake Bars
- Roses Pots of Joy Coffee Escape
- Roses Pots of Joy Hazelnut Whirl
- Roses Pots of Joy Strawberry Dream
- Roses Strawberry Dream Cake Bars
- Sandwich with Vanillia Filling
- Smart Pots Light
- Smart Pots Milk Chocolate
- Smart Pots Mint
- Sponge Roll with Apricot & Vanillia Fillings
- Strawberry Mini Rolls
- Strawberry & Blueberry Mini Rolls
- Swiss Dessert Chocolate Flavour
- Swiss Dessert Vanilla Flavour
- Swiss Roll with Raspberry Flavour Filling
- Toffee Ripple Flavour Mini Rolls
- Triple Choc Crisp Cake Bites
- Turkish Cake Bars

=== Cooking ===
- Buttons Minis Muffins Mix
- Chocolate Brownies
- Heavenly Chocolate Cake
- Milk Chocolate Chunk Brownie Mix
- Milk Chocolate Cookies
- White Chocolate Buttons Cake Mix

=== Biscuits ===
- Angel Creams
- Animal Bites
- Big Crunch Milk Chocolate
- Big Crunch Plain Chocolate
- BiscBits Caramel Crisp
- BiscBits Chocolate Crisp
- BiscBits Honeycomb Crunch
- BiscBits Mint Crunch
- BiscBits Orange Crisp
- BiscBits Rocky Road Crunch
- Bournville Biscuits
- Brownie
- Brunch Bakes Apple & Sultana
- Brunch Bakes Fruit & Nut
- Brunch Breaks Granola, Hazelnut & Raisin
- Brunch Breaks Sunflower Seeds, Hazelnuts & Raisins
- Brunch Munch Oat & Apricot
- Brunch Munch Oat & Honey
- Butter Shorties
- Caprice
- Chocolate Flapjack
- Chocolate Sandwich Chocolate Biscuits
- Chocolate Wafers
- Choc Brownie Flavour
- Choc Rings
- Cookies Chunky Choc & Fruit
- Cookies Chunky Milk, Dark & White Choc
- Dark Chocolate Mint Fingers
- Double Choc Cookies
- Elizabethan Wafers Milk Chocolate
- Elizabethan Wafers Plain Chocolate
- Fingers Bournville
- Fingers Caramel
- Fingers Dark Chocolate Mint
- Fingers Double Chocolate
- Fingers Salted Caramel Crunch
- Fingers Salted Peanut Crunch
- Fingers Toffee Crunch
- Fruit & Nut Flapjack
- Giant Fingers
- Gingermen
- Half Covered Cokernut Milk Chocolate Biscuits
- Half Covered Milk Chocolate Rich T's
- Highlights Chocolate Cookie Crunch
- Highlights Chocolate Nibbles
- Highlights Honeycomb Nibbles
- Highlights Orange Cookie Crunch
- High Tea
- Holiday
- Home Grain
- Honeycomb Fabulous Fingers
- Jestives
- Jestives Choc Chip
- Jumbo Animals
- Lime Creams
- Little Monsters
- Midler
- Milk Assorted
- Milk Finger
- Milk Wafer
- Mini Fingers Honeycomb
- Mini Fingers Mint
- Mini Fingers Toffee Crunch
- Oat & Choc Chip
- Orange Creams
- Orange Sandwich Chocolate Biscuits
- Pickwick Biscuits
- Polar Bears
- Praline Fabulous Fingers
- Raspberry Wafer
- Table Biscuits
- Turkish Biscuits
- White Chocolate Bears

=== Miscellaneous ===
- Christmas Pudding
- Decimal Coins Milk Chocolate
- Milk Chocolate Hazelnut Spread
- Mince Pies
- Smash
- Stackers

== Discontinued Products: Europe ==
=== Germany ===
==== Bars and Blocks ====
- Bournville
- Milk Chocolate
- Milk Chocolate Mocha

=== France ===
==== Bars and Blocks ====
- Milk Chocolate
- Milk Chocolate with Rum and Raisin
- Milk Chocolate with Wholenuts

=== Spain ===
==== Bars and Blocks ====
- Huesitos Leche
- Huesitos Leche x2
- Huesitos Original
- Huesitos Original x2
- Milk Tray Block
- Tokke
- Tokke 3 Pack

==== Bags and Boxes ====
- Huesitos Balls
- Huesitos Mini

==== Multipacks ====
- Huesitos Original 6 Pack
- Huesitos Original 10 Pack

=== Poland ===
==== Bars and Blocks ====
- Allye
- Dairy Milk
- King
- Picnic
- Samba Nougat

== Discontinued products: Africa ==
=== Egypt ===
==== Bars and Blocks ====
- Dairy Milk Marvellous Creations Cookie Gummy Crunch
- Mandolin
- Moro

=== Kenya ===
==== Bars and Blocks ====
- Fruit & Biscuit Crunch
- Grand Seville
- Milk Chocolate Crunch
- Nut Crunch
- Old Jamaica
- Supa Snack Orange
- Fudge
- Mint choc

=== South Africa ===
==== Bars and Blocks ====
- Bournville Classic Dark Chocolate with Caramel Crisp
- Bournville Classic Dark Chocolate with Mint Essence
- Bournville Classic Dark Chocolate with Roasted Almonds
- Bournville Classic Dark Chocolate with Orange Essence
- Bigger Chomp
- Bonton Cappuccino
- Bonton Mint
- Brazil Nut
- Candy Nut
- Centerfold
- Cherry Chomp
- Chunky Fruit & Nut
- Chunky Golden Crisp
- Chunky Snack
- Dairy Milk Chocolate Brownie
- Dairy Milk Coconut Ice
- Dairy Milk Coffee & Condensed Milk
- Dairy Milk Crème Caramel
- Dairy Milk Marula & Ice Cream
- Dairy Milk Marvellous Creations Cookie Gummy Crunch
- Dairy Milk Mint Crisp Fridge Tart
- Dairy Milk Mousse
- Dairy Milk Question
- Dairy Milk Traditional Milk Tart
- Dairy Milk Turkish
- Dream with Almond and Coconut
- Flake Dipped
- Fruit
- Fruit Fare
- Honey Crisp
- Liquid Centres Caramel
- Liquid Centres Condensed Milk
- Liquid Centres Peppermint
- Lunch Bar Triple Choc
- Sevens
- Snacker Yoghurt
- Snowflake
- Special Selection Apricots in Brandy
- Special Selection Ginger Pieces
- Special Selection Pineapple and Almonds
- Sweetie Pie
- Tempo
- Tempo Power-Nut
- Three Wishes Caramilk Centre
- Walnut

== Discontinued products: Australia ==
=== Bars and Blocks ===
- Boost Max Caramel
- Boost Max Caramel Twin Pack
- Boost Max Choc
- Boost Max Choc x2
- Boost Nuts
- Boost Stix
- Boost Toffee Crunch
- Boost Totally Nuts
- Brazil Nut
- Breakaway Dream
- Breakaway King Size
- Breakaway Share Pack
- Bubbly Dark
- Butter Chip
- Candy Nut
- Cashews
- Cashew Nut
- Cherry Nut
- Cherry Ripe Burst
- Cherry Ripe Cherry Roll
- Cherry Ripe Dark Ganache
- Cherry Ripe Double Dipped with 60% Cocoa
- Cherry Ripe In A Block
- Chunky Dairy Milk
- Chunky Peppermint
- Chunky Top Deck
- Coconut Ice
- Coconut Rough
- Coco 70% Cocoa Raspberry
- Coco 70% Cocoa Salty Liquoce
- Coco 70% Cocoa Sea Salt & Pecan
- Coffee Walnut
- Connoisseur Coffee and Cream
- Connoisseur Grand Marnier Truffle
- Connoisseur Praline
- Crispello Double Choc
- Crispello Vanilla Velvet
- Crisp-O Mint
- Dairy Milk Apple Crumble
- Dairy Milk Breakaway (relaunched 2021 as part of the Cadbury Old Gold breakaway introduced)
- Dairy Milk Bubbly Honeycomb
- Dairy Milk Bubbly Strawberry
- Dairy Milk Bubbly White
- Dairy Milk Cookies
- Dairy Milk Crackle
- Dairy Milk Desserts Boysenberry Shortcake
- Dairy Milk Desserts Fudge Brownie
- Dairy Milk Desserts Lemon Cheesecake
- Dairy Milk Desserts Tiramisu
- Dairy Milk Desserts Crème Brulee
- Dairy Milk Golden Toffee
- Dairy Milk Green and Gold
- Dairy Milk Lamington
- Dairy Milk Marvellous Creations Banana Candy Peanut Drops Choc Biscuit
- Dairy Milk Marvellous Creations Clinkers Gummi Bears Choc Biscuit
- Dairy Milk Marvellous Creations Cola Popping Candy Fizzy Crunch
- Dairy Milk Marvellous Creations Jammy Doughnut
- Dairy Milk Marvellous Creations Max! Popping Candy, Fizz Lollies and Jelly
- Dairy Milk Marvellous Creations Orange Lolly Orange Chew Fizzy Crunch
- Dairy Milk Marvellous Creations Peanut Toffee Cookie
- Dairy Milk Marvellous Creations Raspberry Lemonade
- Dairy Milk Marvellous Creations Toffee Apple Chew Toffee Apple Chip Crunchie Bits
- Dairy Milk Mega Crunchie
- Dairy Milk Mint Chip
- Dairy Milk Mousse Caramel
- Dairy Milk Mousse Chocolate
- Dairy Milk Mousse Double Chocolate
- Dairy Milk Mousse Hazelnut
- Dairy Milk Mousse Raspberry Chocolate
- Dairy Milk Picnic In A Block
- Dairy Milk Pretzel & Peanut
- Dairy Milk Salted Caramel
- Dairy Milk Strawberries & Crème
- Dairy Milk Toffee Brittle
- Dairy Milk with Vegemite
- Dream Rainbow Balls & Popping Candy
- Dream with Oreo (launched 2017, discontinued in 2019, and relaunched in 2023)
- Energy
- Flake Dipped
- Flake Luxury
- Flake Mint
- Flake Mocha
- Flake Snow
- Finest Dark
- Freddo Crunchie
- Freddo Jelly Block
- Freddo Rainbow Chip
- Freddo Twins Pineapple
- Freddo 100s and 1000s
- Fruit & Nut Milk
- Ginger
- Gold Caramel
- Grilled Almond Dark
- Guinea Gold
- Hazelnut Cream
- Honey Crisp
- Lite Milk
- Looney Tunes Family Block
- Milk Lunch
- Milk Punch
- Mini White Farm Friends
- Mocha-Orange Truffle
- Mr Big Picnic
- Nut Break
- Nut Crunch
- Nut Milk
- Old Gold Liqueur Flavoured Selection
- Old Gold Toffee Crunch
- Old Jamaica
- Peanut Bar
- Picnic Cookie Crunch
- Picnic Frugly
- Picnic Fruit & Nut
- Picnic Hedgehog
- Picnic Honeycomb
- Picnic Honey Almond Nougat
- Picnic Roast Almond Feast
- Picnic Rocky Road
- Pocket Pack Caramello
- Pocket Pack Fruit & Nut
- Pocket Pack Peppermint
- Scorched Almond
- Snack Strawberries & Cream
- Story Block
- Strawberry
- Sultana
- Summer Fruits
- Swiss Chalet
- Toffee Nut
- Toffee Regal
- Twirl Caramel
- Twirl Mint
- Twirl Orange
- White
- Wobbly

=== Bags, Boxes and Rolls ===
- Crispello Double Choc
- Crispello Vanilla Velvet
- Crunchie Rocks
- Dairy Milk Caramello Nibbles
- Dairy Milk Caramello Roll
- Dairy Milk Marvellous Creations Caramel Shakes
- Dairy Milk Marvellous Creations Jelly Zingers
- Dairy Milk Marvellous Creations Toffee Nutters
- Dairy Milk Peppermint Roll
- Dairy Milk Roll
- Mini Drops
- Scotch Terrier Assortment

=== Biscuits ===
- Breakaway Honeycomb
- Crunchie Biscuits
- Dairy Milk Biscuits
- Fingers Honeycomb
- Freddo Chocolate Biscuits
- Freddo Chocolate Snack Pack
- Freddo Vanilla Biscuits
- Freddo Vanilla Snack Pack
- Mini Fingers Honeycomb
- Mini Fingers Milk Chocolate

=== Ice Creams ===
- Dairy Milk Marvellous Ice Cream Banana Candy, Bubblegum and Fudge Cookie
- Dairy Milk Marvellous Ice Cream Choc-Honeycomb Cookie
- Dairy Milk Marvellous Ice Cream Jelly Popping Candy Beanies

=== Beverages ===
- Export Cola

== Discontinued products: New Zealand ==
=== Bars and Blocks ===
- Almond Nut
- Aztec
- Banana Shake
- Black Forest Chunky
- Biscotti
- Caramello Kiwi
- Charlie Brown Bar
- Coconice
- Coconut Delight
- Coconut Royal
- Countrystyle
- Choc-A-Nut
- Crunch
- Cruson
- Curly Wurly Banana
- Dairy Milk Apple Crumble
- Dairy Milk Bonkers 4 Berry
- Dairy Milk Crackle
- Dairy Milk Craving 4 Coffee
- Dairy Milk Crazy 4 Caramel
- Dairy Milk Lamington
- Dairy Milk Mad 4 Mint
- Dairy Milk Marvellous Creations Cola Popping Candy Fizzy Crunch
- Dairy Milk Marvellous Creations Orange Lolly Orange Chew Fizzy Crunch
- Dairy Milk Marvellous Creations Peanut Toffee Cookie
- Dairy Milk Marvellous Creations Toffee Apple Chew Toffee Apple Chip Crunchie Bits
- Dairy Milk Mousse Chocolate
- Dairy Milk Mousse Double Chocolate
- Dairy Milk Pretzel & Peanut
- Dairy Milk Raspberry Chocolate
- Dairy Milk Raspberry & Lemonade
- Dairy Milk Salted Caramel
- Dairy Milk with Jaffas
- Double Choc Hit
- Energy Chunky
- English Toffee Truffle
- Farm Animals
- Farm Friends
- Fruit Crunch
- Goldie Bar
- Guinea Gold
- Happy Times
- Honeycomb
- Honey Nougat
- Honeycomb Sandwich
- Jelly Choc Chip
- Jurassic Park Bar
- King Size Plus Crunch
- King Size Plus Double Chocolate
- Kool Bananas
- Kool Cola
- Kool Krunch
- Looney Tunes Bar
- Lunas Bar
- Luxury Flake
- Milky White
- Mini White Farm Animals
- Mint Crunchie
- Monster Bar
- Moro Almond
- Moro Energy Max
- Moro Gold Max Caramel
- Moro Gold Max Caramel Twin Pack
- Moro Gold Stix
- Moro Gold Totally Nuts
- Neopolitan
- Nudge
- Nut Milk
- Nutty Bar
- Ooze Bar
- Orange Truffle
- Pineapple Milk Chocolate
- Raisin
- Rocky Road Chunky
- Rum and Butter
- Snoopy Bar
- Snowflake
- Story Block
- Sunny
- Swing
- Take 5
- Tempo
- Test Players
- The Simpsons Bar
- The Wombles Bar
- The Young Indiana Jones Chronicles Bar
- Toastie
- Trigger
- Viking with Guarana
- Whip
- White Top
- Wobbly
- Wriggler
- Y2K

=== Bags, Boxes and Rolls ===
- Choc Shocks
- Dairy Milk Bubbly Sharepack
- D.M.C's
- Dairy Milk Croquettes Roll
- Fudge Duets
- Footys
- Jax
- Pebbles
- Scorched Almonds
- Snowballs

=== Beverages ===
- Bournvita

=== Biscuits ===
- Fingers Chocolate
- Fingers Honeycomb
- Fingers Milk Chocolate
- Freddo Chocolate Biscuits
- Freddo Vanilla Biscuits

=== Miscellaneous ===
- Chippies Salt & Vinegar Potato Chips

== Discontinued products: Canada ==
=== Bars and Blocks ===
- Almonds
- Almond & Raisin
- Amazon Brittle
- Astros
- Bar Six
- Brazil Nut
- Cappuccino
- Caramilk Choc-o-Men
- Caramilk Coffee
- Caramilk Fudge
- Caramilk Maple
- Caramilk Secrets
- Coconut
- Coffee
- Crisps & Honey
- Crunch
- Crunchie Crush Orange
- Dairy Milk Bunnies
- Dairy Milk Coconut & Cashews
- Dairy Milk Honey Roasted Cashews & Hazelnuts
- Dairy Milk Peanut Butter
- Dairy Milk Salty Caramelised Peanut
- Dairy Milk Thins
- Dairy Milk Thins Mint Chip
- Dairy Milk Thins Toffee
- Extra
- Finest Dark
- Fusion
- Golden Crisp
- Honeycrisp
- Ice Breaker
- Macaroon
- Malted Milk
- Milk Tray Chocolate
- Mr. Big Double Dunk
- Nut Milk
- Pep
- Peppermint
- Raspberry
- Rum & Butter
- Semi-Sweet
- Snack Bar
- Sweet Marie
- Thick Hazel Nut
- Time Out
- Vanilla Creme
- Yogurt

== Discontinued products: North America ==
=== Bars and Blocks ===
- Almond
- Almond Joy
- Brazil Nut
- Choice
- Coconut
- Crisp
- Curly Wurly
- Hazel Nut
- Krisp
- Mint
- Starbar

== Discontinued products: India ==
=== Bars, Blocks, Bags and Boxes ===
- Bournville Fruit & Nut
- Chocki Stick Chocolates
- Chocki Stick Mango
- Chocki Stick Strawberry
- Chocki Stick Vanilla
- Dairy Milk Butterscotch Crunch
- Dairy Milk Cashew & Coconut
- Dairy Milk Silk Orange Peel
- Dairy Milk Wowie
- Milk Treat
- Milk Treat Creamy
- Orange Delite
- Relish
- Temptations Black Forest
- Temptations Cashew Delite
- Temptations Honey Apricot
- Temptations Mint Crunch
- Temptations Old Jamaica
- Temptations Roast Almond Coffee
- Tiffins
- Cadbury Bytes
