= Mini Eggs =

Chocolate candy produced by Cadbury

Cadbury Mini Eggs
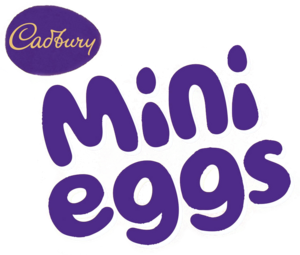

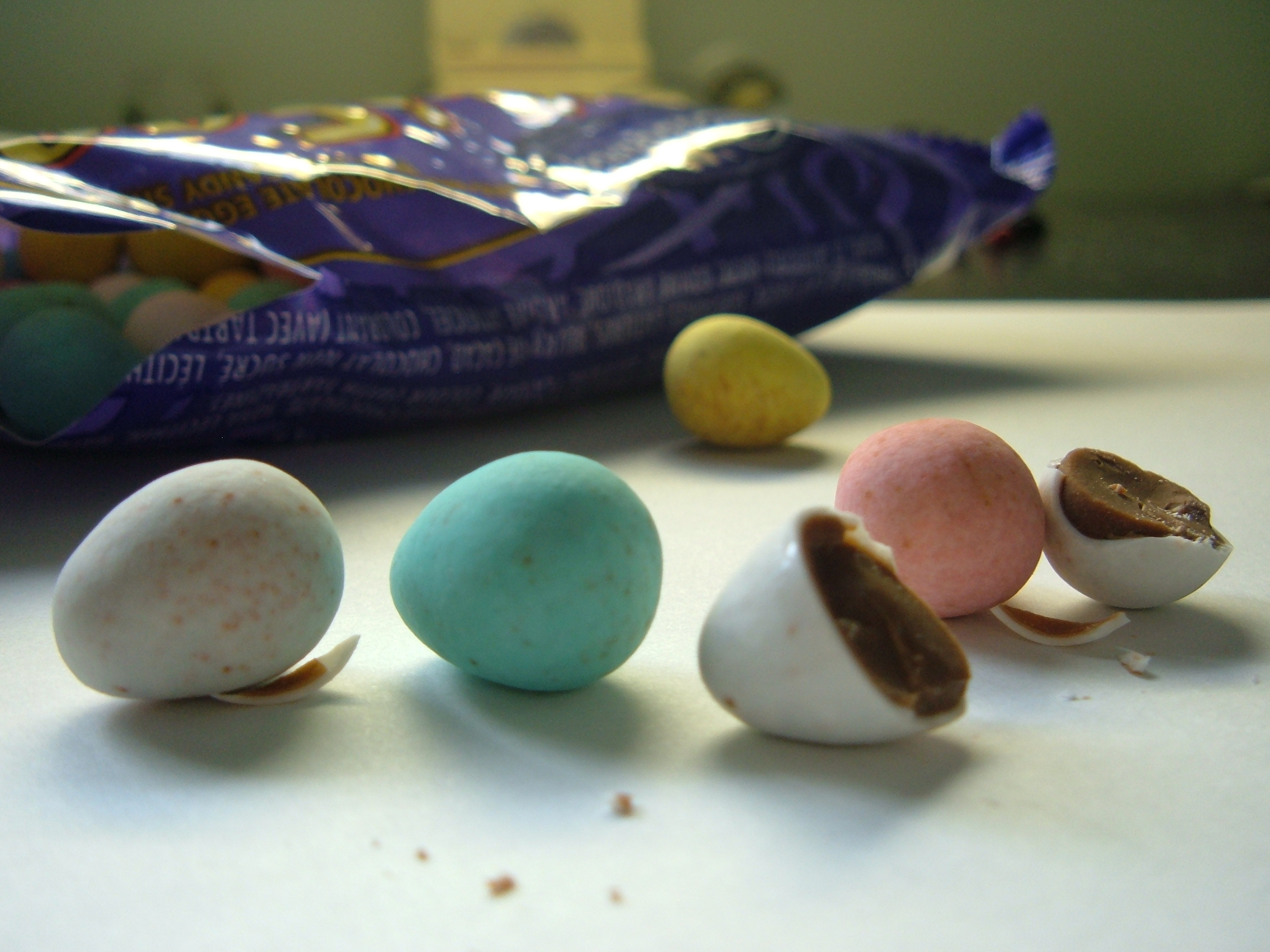
- Mini Eggs, one broken to show the chocolate interior
- Product type: Confectionery
- Current owner: Cadbury
- Produced by: Cadbury
- Country: United Kingdom
- Introduced: 1967; 59 years ago
- Website: cadbury.co.uk/products/brands/mini-eggs

Cadbury Mini Eggs are a milk chocolate product created and produced by Cadbury. Introduced in 1967, the egg is solid milk chocolate encased in a thin coating of hard candy "shell", molded to resemble a miniature egg. They are popular around Easter.

Mini Eggs were previously produced in the Keynsham plant in Somerset, England; however, as of February 2010, production has moved to Cadbury's new plant in Bielany Wrocławskie, Poland.

== Variants ==
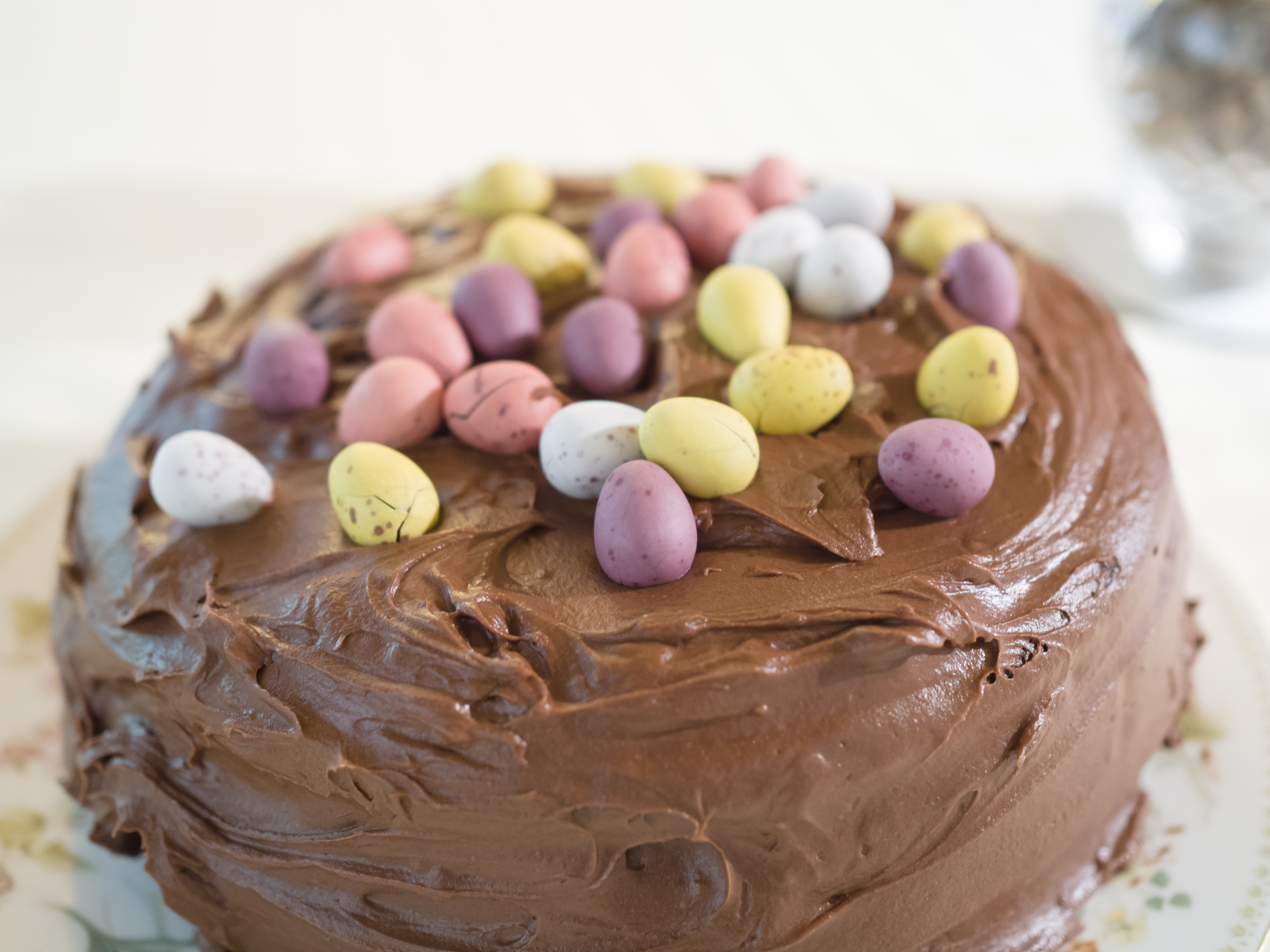
A chocolate cake decorated with Mini Eggs

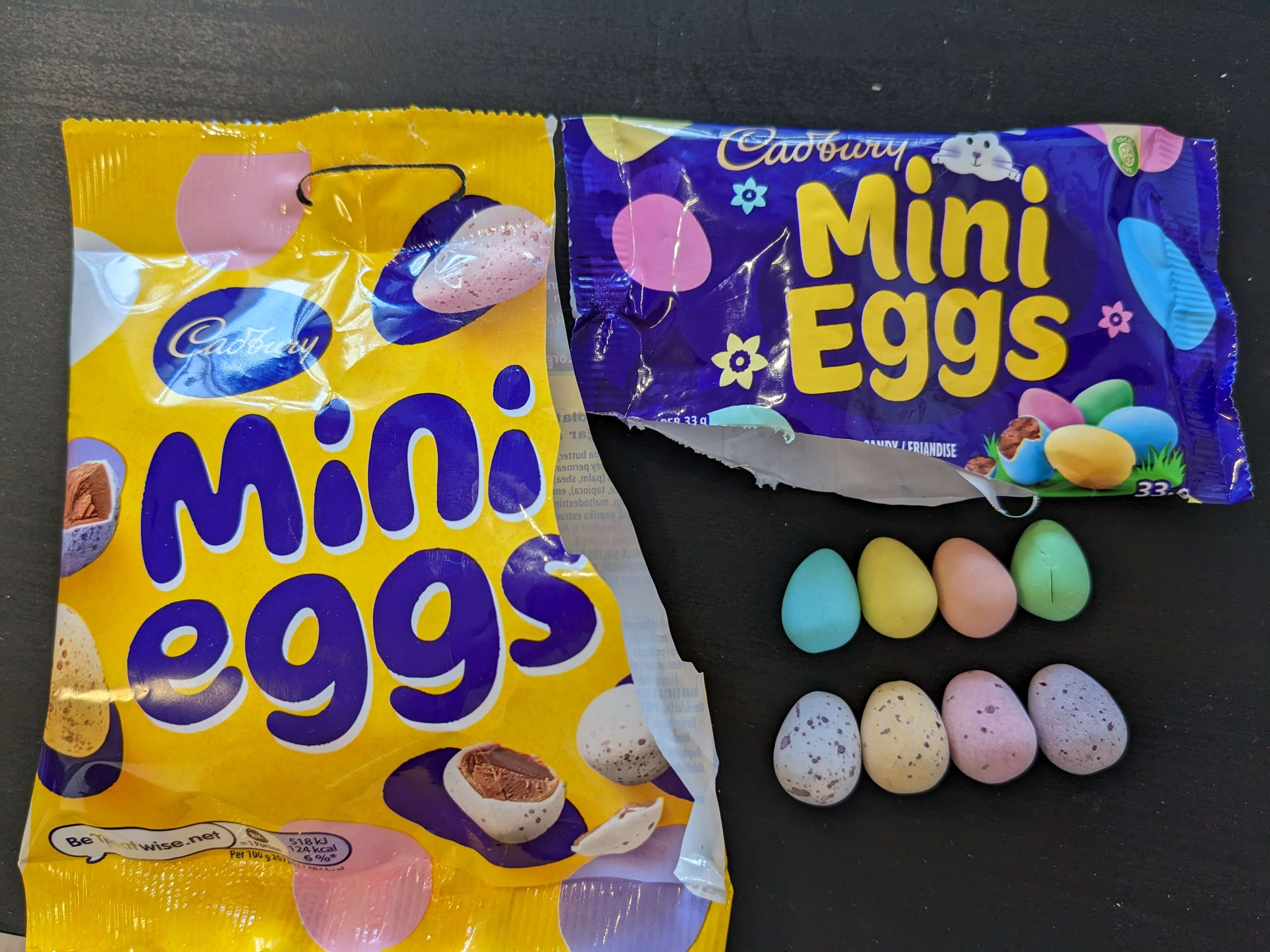
Canadian Mini Eggs (top) differ in size and colour, compared to British Mini Eggs (bottom)

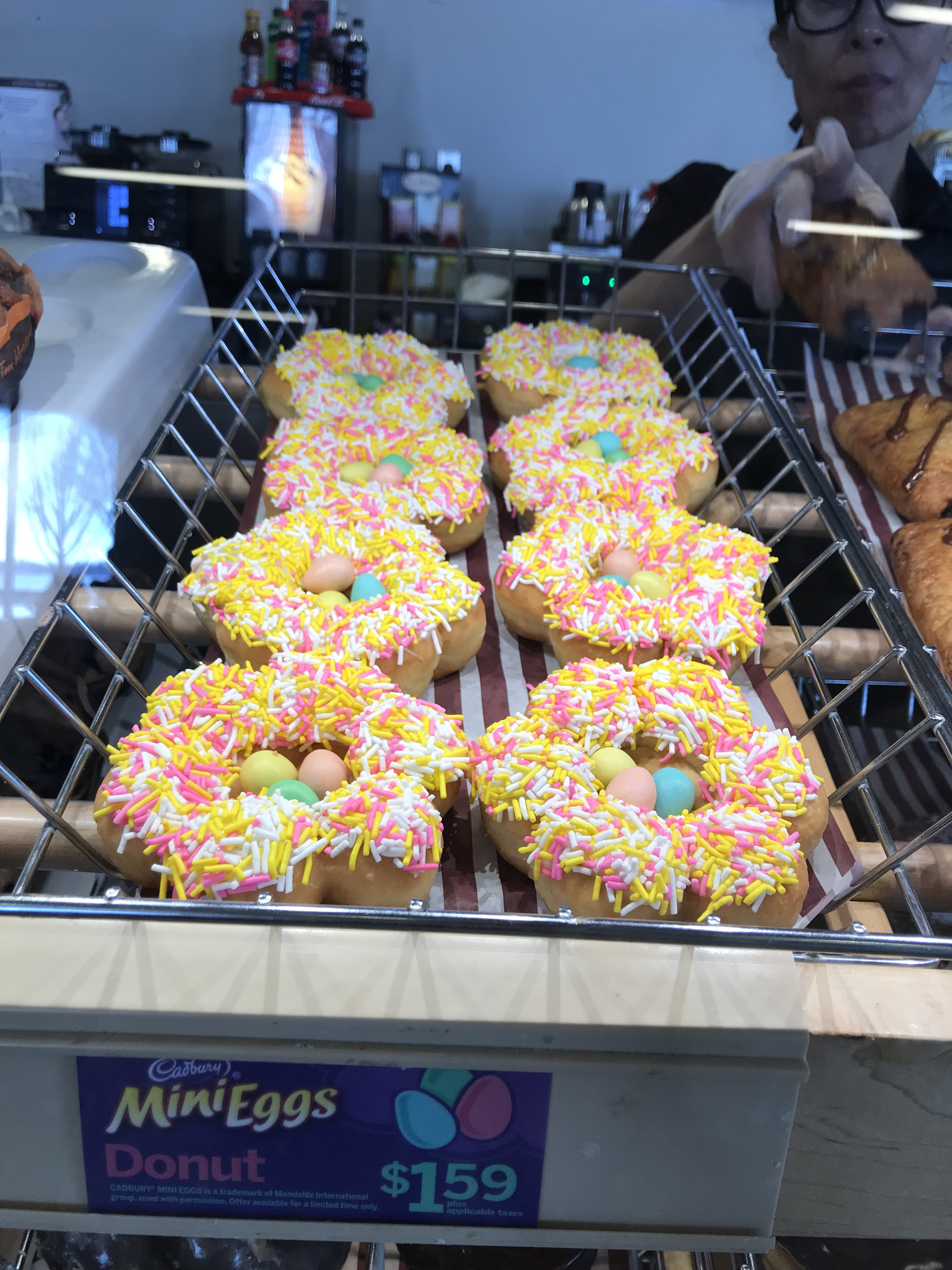
Mini Egg doughnuts on display at Canadian café franchise Tim Hortons

Over the years, Cadbury has introduced a number of variations related to the original Mini Eggs, including:

- Shimmer Mini Eggs (metallic colored shells)
- Dark Mini Eggs (dark chocolate, discontinued)
- Popping Mini Eggs ("pops" when melted in mouth)
- Micro Mini Eggs (even smaller variation of Mini Eggs) (introduced in 2007)
- White Mini Eggs (white Mini Eggs with white chocolate inside) (introduced as a Target exclusive in 2014)
- Orange Mini Eggs (orange flavour milk chocolate in an orange shell) (This variety is exclusive to Tesco stores)

== See also ==
- List of Cadbury products
- Cadbury Creme Egg
