= Twirl (chocolate bar) =

Cadbury chocolate bar

- Product type: Confectionery
- Current owner: Cadbury
- Country: Ireland
- Introduced: 1985
- Related brands: List of Cadbury products

Twirl is a chocolate bar manufactured by the British chocolate company Cadbury. Twirl consists of two Flake-style fingers covered in milk chocolate. Twirl was invented in Dublin by Cadbury Ireland, and launched there in 1985 as a single-finger bar. It was named through a competition in the "Beano" comic, the winning name coming from a child in the West Riding of Yorkshire. Then released in Britain two years later as a twin-finger bar. It has been marketed internationally since the 1990s and is now one of the best-selling chocolate Cadbury products.

== Variations ==
Cadbury have produced many variants of the standard Twirl. A snack sized version called Twirl Bites, which come in a bag containing several smaller Twirl-like chocolates, is available. As of 2023 there is also a multipack version containing 5 single Twirl bars. This 5-pack weighs 107.5 grams, each bar weighing exactly 21.5 grams. This is a reduction in weight relative to the previously available 34 gram, 4-bar multipacks of 21%. Other flavours include orange that launched as a limited edition in 2019 in Britain. Many stores struggled to keep stock of the bar, repeatedly selling out due to the high demand. In August 2020, Cadbury announced the return of the Orange Twirl and it has since become a permanent product.

In June 2022, Cadbury launched a new flavour, Twirl Caramel, and in May 2023, Cadbury launched the Twirl Mint. A discontinued Iced Latte Twirl was available in Australia.In 2025 a limited edition White dipped version was launched in the UK. A Twirl Caramilk variation is available in Australia as of August 2026. In Australia, the chocolate bar Time Out was rebranded to Twirl Breakaway and later Twirl Crispy. A cookie dough version was briefly available but is now discontinued. A bigger version of Twirl, known as Big Twirl, weighs 43g compared to the standard 39g.
