= Fuse (chocolate bar) =

Brand of chocolate bar manufactured by Cadbury in the United Kingdom

- Product type: Confectionery
- Current owner: Cadbury
- Country: United Kingdom; India
- Introduced: 1996 (UK); 2015 (Promotional relaunch of 100 bars); 2016 (India)
- Discontinued: 2006 (UK)
- Related brands: List of Cadbury products
- Tagline: "Don't blow a fuse, eat one." "Only eat while wearing rubber soled shoes."

Fuse is a brand of chocolate bar manufactured by Cadbury in India since 2016. A different bar of the same name was produced in the United Kingdom between 1996 and 2006.

== British Fuse ==
The original British product was a 70% solid bar of milk chocolate, and 30%, sliced peanuts, raisins, crisp cereal and fudge pieces suspended within it. Fuse was Cadbury's fastest selling new chocolate bar since the launch of Cadbury ‘Wispa’ in 1983. The bar tested very well in research, with 82% rating it as excellent or very good and 83% proposing to purchase it regularly.

Fuse was the subject of a large marketing campaign leading to a national rollout of the product on "FuseDay" - Tuesday 24 September 1996.

The unusually large marketing campaign was the subject of a documentary by TV Choice Ltd - The Marketing Mix at Cadbury's (1998).

Forty million Fuse bars were sold in the first week of release.

In September 1999 Cadbury launched Miniature Heroes which were a response to rival Mars' Celebrations. Miniature Heroes contained miniature versions of various Cadbury chocolate bars including Fuse which was featured in the selection until being retired in 2004.

Fuse bars were discontinued in November 2006.

As of early 2010, there are various campaigns in progress to see its return to the shelves.

In October 2015, Cadbury launched a Twitter campaign, #CadburyCraveyard, where fans could tweet the hashtag or comment on a qualifying Facebook post for which chocolate bar, out of Fuse or Marble, they wanted to resurrect for Halloween. The bar that proved to be most popular was Fuse, and it was then recreated using the same recipe and ingredients and distributed to 100 randomly selected winners. By July 2016 Cadbury had begun secret product testing and taste trials with select consumers across the UK to perfect the recipe prior to its public relaunch.

== Indian Fuse ==
Mondelez Ltd., the manufacturer of Cadbury products, launched Fuse in India in September 2016.

"I think now we have an opportunity here to create a premium product to what we had in 5 Star. I think Cadbury Fuse will do that for us and create a whole new segment," said Manu Anand, president, chocolate, Asia-Pacific, Mondelez International. It launched in an e-commerce portal, two weeks before it hit the shelves The 2016 Indian bar is different from the original.
