= Cadbury Creme Egg =

Chocolate egg with fondant creme filling

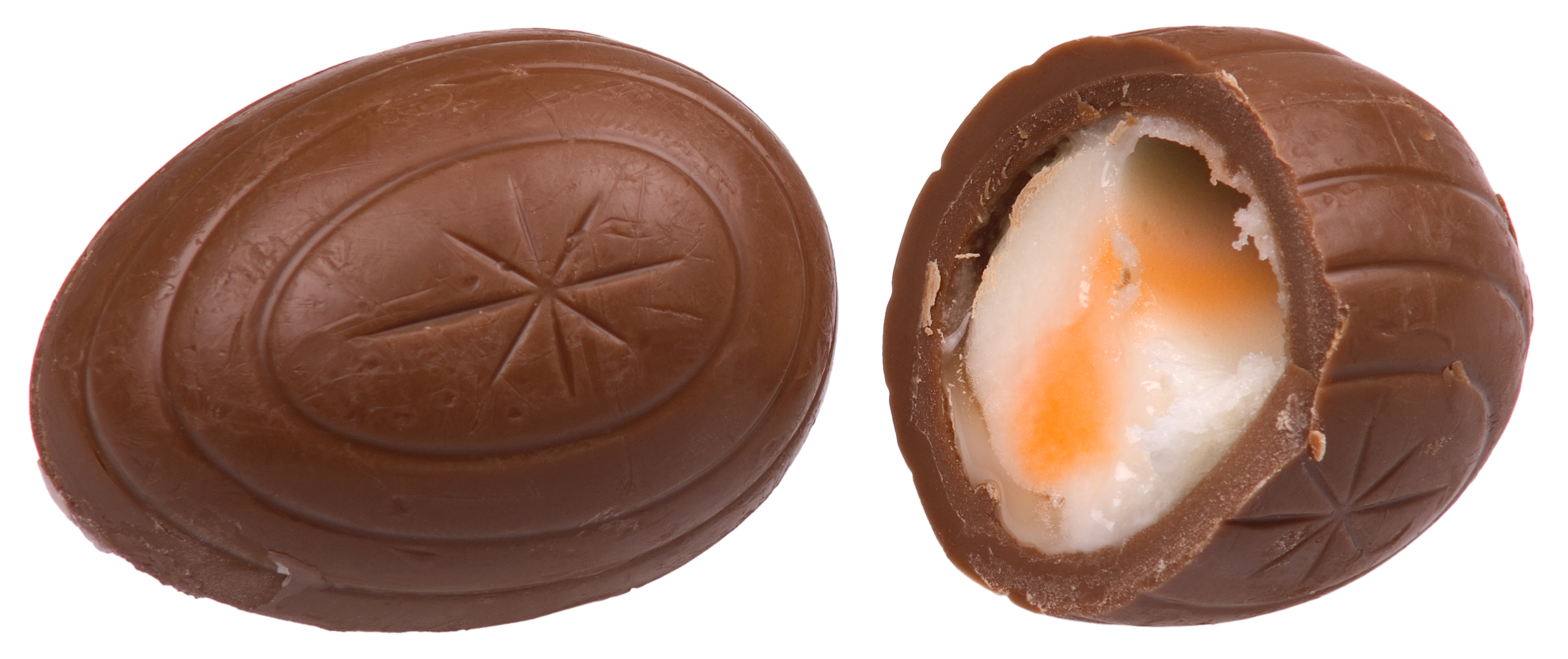
- A whole and split Cadbury Creme Egg
- Product type: Confectionery
- Current owner: Cadbury (Mondelez International)
- Produced by: The Hershey Company (US market)
- Country: United Kingdom
- Introduced: 1963; 63 years ago (renamed Cadbury Creme Egg in 1971)
- Related brands: List of Cadbury brands
- Markets: Worldwide
- Website: cadbury.co.uk/creme-egg

Cadbury Creme Egg (originally named Fry's Creme Egg), is a seasonal chocolate confection produced in the shape of an egg. It was launched by the British chocolatier J. S. Fry's in 1963 before being renamed under sister brand Cadbury's in 1971. The product consists of a thick chocolate shell containing a sweet white and yellow fondant filling. The filling mimics the egg white and yolk of a soft boiled egg.

== History ==
While filled eggs were first manufactured by the Cadbury Brothers in 1923, the Creme Egg in its current form was introduced in 1963. Initially known as Fry's Creme Eggs, they were renamed Cadbury's Creme Eggs in 1971.

== Composition ==
Cadbury Creme Egg
- Type: Artificial
- Place of origin: England
- Region or state: West Midlands
- Invented: 1963
- Main ingredients: Sugar, glucose syrup, invert sugar syrup, palm oil, industrial-grade cocoa mass
- Variations: Screme Egg (Halloween, United Kingdom); Creme Egg McFlurry (McDonald's UK); Creme Egg Twisted Bar (Cadbury, UK)
- Food energy (per 40 g (1.4 oz) serving): 177 kcal (740 kJ)
Nutritional value
(per 40 g (1.4 oz) serving)
- Protein: g
- Fat: 6.1 g
- Carbohydrate: 29 g

Cadbury Creme Eggs are manufactured as two chocolate half shells, each of which is filled with a white fondant made from sugar, glucose syrup, inverted sugar syrup, dried egg white and flavouring. The fondant in each half is topped with a smaller amount of the same mixture coloured yellow with paprika extract, to mimic the yolk and white of a real egg. Both halves are then quickly joined and cooled, the shell bonding together in the process. The solid eggs are removed from the moulds and wrapped in foil.

During an interview in a 2007 episode of Late Night with Conan O'Brien, actor B. J. Novak drew attention to the fact that American market Cadbury Creme Eggs had decreased in size, despite the official Cadbury website stating otherwise. American Creme Eggs at the time weighed 34 g (1.2 oz) and contained 150 kcal. Before 2006, the eggs marketed by Hershey were identical to the UK version, weighing 39 g (1.4 oz) and containing 170 kcal.

In 2015, the British Cadbury company under the American Mondelez International conglomerate announced that it had changed the formula of the Cadbury Creme Egg by replacing its Cadbury Dairy Milk chocolate with "standard cocoa mix chocolate". It had also reduced the packaging from six eggs to five, with a less than proportionate decrease in price. This resulted in a large number of complaints from consumers. Analysts at IRI found that Cadbury lost more than $12 million in Creme Egg sales in the UK.

== Manufacture ==
Creme Eggs are produced by Cadbury in the United Kingdom, by The Hershey Company in the United States, and by Cadbury Adams in Canada. They are sold by Cadbury parent Mondelez International in all markets except the US, where The Hershey Company has the local marketing rights for all Cadbury products there. At Cadbury's Bournville factory in the English city of Birmingham, they are manufactured at a rate of 1.5 million per day.

The Creme Egg was also previously manufactured in New Zealand, but has been imported from the UK since 2009. Creme Eggs were manufactured in New Zealand at the Cadbury factory in Dunedin from 1983 to 2009. Cadbury in New Zealand and Australia went through a restructuring process, with most Cadbury products previously produced in New Zealand being manufactured instead at Cadbury factories in Australia. Cadbury Australia produces some Creme Eggs products for the Australian market, most prominently the Mini Creme Egg. New Zealand's Dunedin plant later received a $69 million upgrade to specialise in boxed products such as Cadbury Roses, and Creme Eggs were no longer produced there. The result of the changes meant that Creme Eggs were instead imported from the United Kingdom. The change also saw the range of Creme Eggs available for sale decrease. The size also dropped from 40 g (1.4 oz) to 39 g (1.4 oz) in this time. The response from New Zealanders was not positive, with complaints including the filling not being as runny as the New Zealand version. As of 2024, Cadbury Australia continue to produce the Mini Egg variant.

== Sales ==
A YouGov poll saw the Creme Egg ranked as the most famous confectionery in the UK.

As of 2011 the Creme Egg was the best-selling confectionery item between New Year's Day and Easter in the UK, with annual sales in excess of 200 million eggs and a brand value of approximately £55 million. However, in 2016 sales plummeted after the controversial decision to change the recipe from the original Cadbury Dairy Milk chocolate to a cheaper substitute, with reports of a loss of more than £6M in sales.

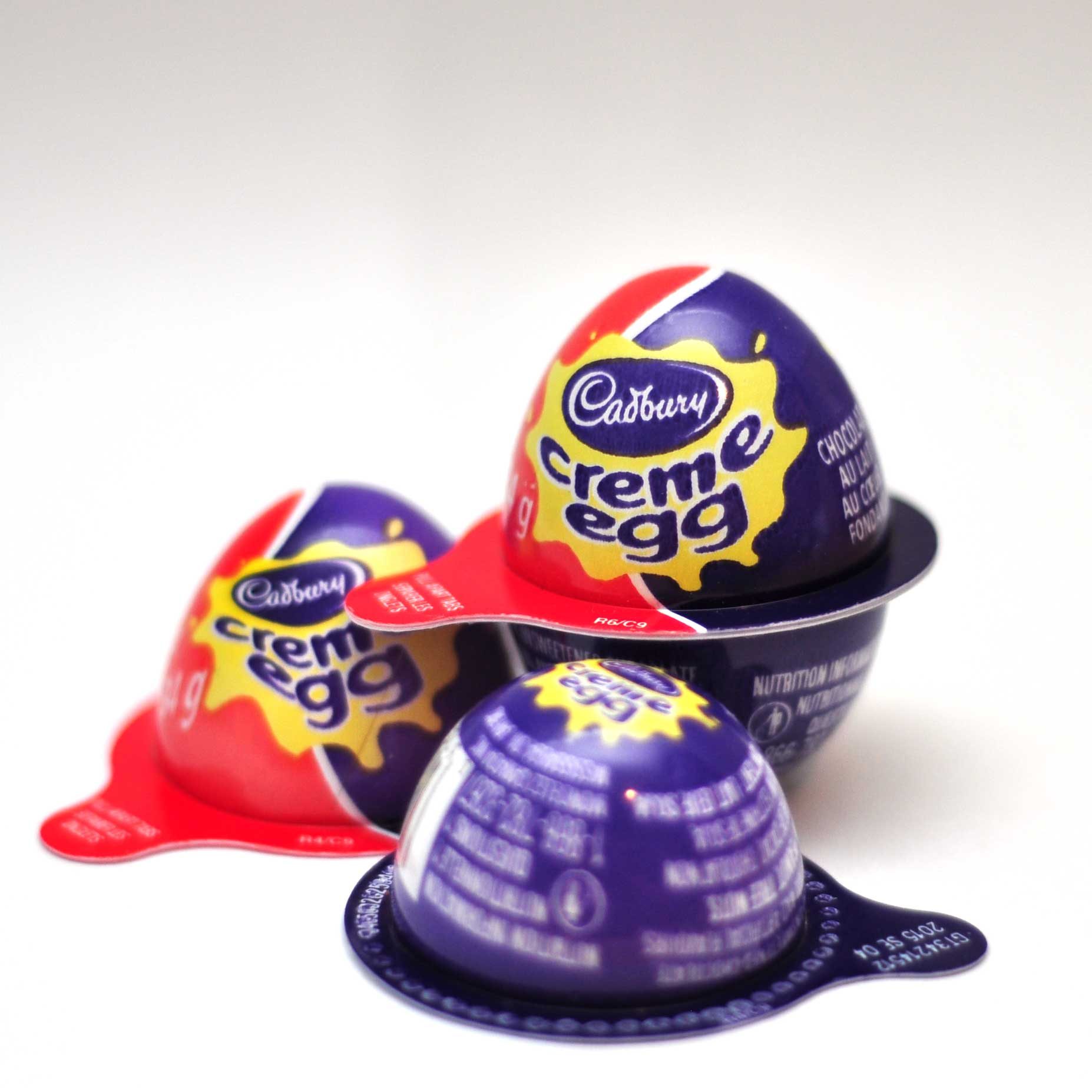
New packaging introduced in Canada

Creme Eggs are available individually and in boxes, with the numbers of eggs per package varying per country. The foil wrapping of the eggs was traditionally pink, blue, green, and yellow with a chick on it in the United Kingdom and Ireland, though green and the chick were removed and purple replaced blue early in the 21st century. In the United States, some green is incorporated into the design, which previously featured the product's mascot, the Creme Egg Chick. As of 2015, the packaging in Canada has been changed to a 34 g (1.2 oz), purple, red and yellow soft plastic shell.

Creme Eggs are available annually between New Year's Day and Easter. In the UK in the 1980s, Cadbury made Creme Eggs available year-round but sales dropped and they returned to seasonal availability. In 2018, white chocolate versions of the Creme Eggs were made available. These eggs were not given a wrapper that clearly marked them as white chocolate eggs, and were mixed in with the normal Creme Eggs in the United Kingdom. Individuals who discovered an egg would win money via a ticket that had a code printed on it inside of the wrapper.

== Advertising ==
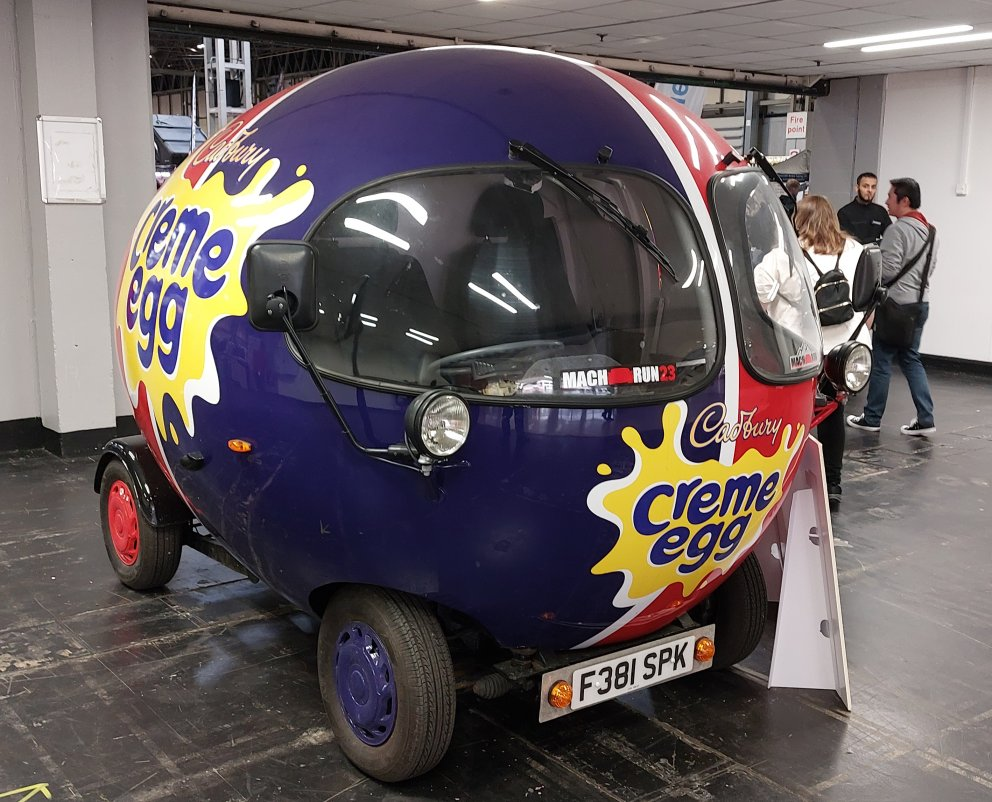
A Creme Egg brandmobile

The Creme Egg has been marketed in the UK and Ireland with the question "How do you eat yours?" and in New Zealand with the slogan "Don't get caught with egg on your face". Australia and New Zealand have also used a variation of the UK question, using the slogan "How do you do it?"

In the US, Creme Eggs are advertised on television with a small white rabbit called the Cadbury Bunny (alluding to the Easter Bunny) which clucks like a chicken. Other animals dressed with bunny ears have also been used in the television ads, and in 2021, out of over 12,000 submissions in the Hershey Company's third annual tryouts, an Australian tree frog named Betty was named the newest Cadbury Bunny. Ads for caramel eggs use a larger gold-coloured rabbit which also clucks, and chocolate eggs use a large brown rabbit which clucks in a deep voice. The advertisements use the slogan "Nobunny knows Easter better than him", spoken by TV personality Mason Adams. The adverts have continued to air nearly unchanged into the high definition era and after Adams's death in 2005, though currently the ad image is slightly zoomed to fill the screen. The majority of rabbits used in the Cadbury commercials are Flemish Giants.

In the UK, around the year 2000, selected stores were provided standalone paperboard cutouts of something resembling a "love tester". The shopper would press a button in the centre and a "spinner" (a series of LED lights) would select at random a way of eating the Creme Egg, e.g. "with chips". These were withdrawn within a year. There are also the "Creme Egg Cars" which are, as the name suggest, ovular vehicles painted to look like Creme Eggs. They are driven to various places to advertise the eggs but are based mainly at the Cadbury factory in Bournville. Five "Creme Egg Cars" were built from Bedford Rascal donor vehicles by John Mitchell coachbuilder of Biggleswade. His design necessitated the construction of bespoke chassis. The headlights are taken from a Citroën 2CV.

For the 2008/2009 season, advertising in the UK, Ireland, Australia, New Zealand and Canada consisted of stopmotion adverts in the "Here Today, Goo Tomorrow" campaign which comprised a Creme Egg stripping its wrapper off and then breaking its own shell, usually with household appliances and equipment, while making various 'goo' sounds/noises (as the only sounds and voices they make are the sole word "goo"), and a 'relieved' sound/noise when it has finally been able to break its shell. The Cadbury's Creme Egg website featured games where the player had to prevent the egg from finding a way to release its own "goo".

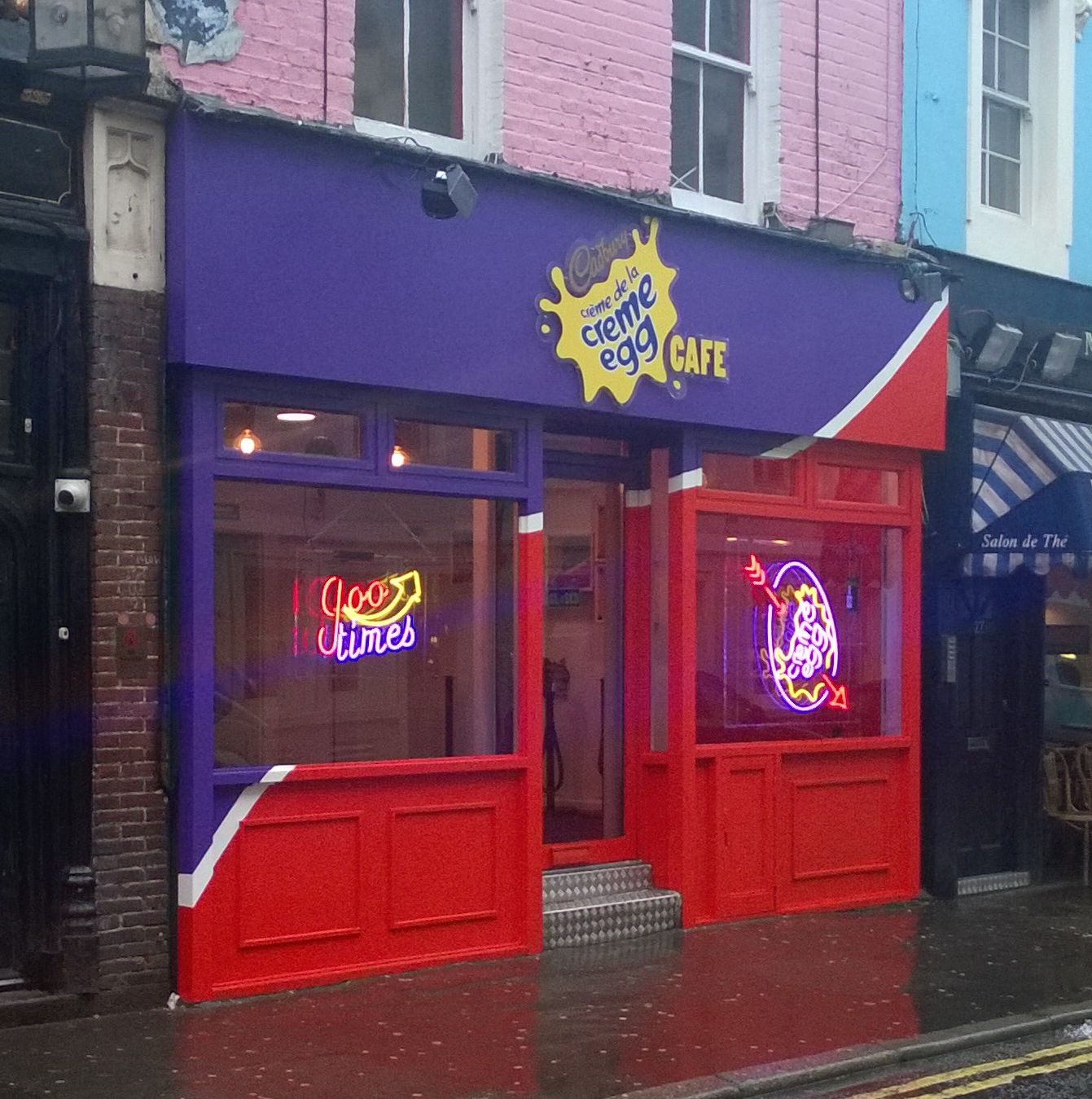
Crème de la Creme Egg pop-up café in Soho, London, 2016

A similar advertising campaign in 2010 featured animated Creme Eggs destroying themselves in large numbers, such as gathering together at a cinema before bombarding into each other to release all of the eggs' goo, and another which featured eggs being destroyed by mouse traps.

In Halloween 2011, 2012 and 2013, advertising in Canada and New Zealand consisted of the "Screme Egg" Easter aliens, such as 48 seconds in the advertising.

=== Creme Egg Café ===
In 2016, Cadbury opened a pop-up café titled "Crème de la Creme Egg Café" in London. Tickets for the café sold out within an hour of being published online. The café on Greek Street, Soho, was open every Friday, Saturday and Sunday from 22 January to 6 March 2016.

=== Creme Egg Camp ===
In 2018, Cadbury opened a pop-up camp. The camp in Last Days of Shoreditch, Old Street was open every Thursday to Sunday from 19 January, to 18 February 2018

== Varieties ==
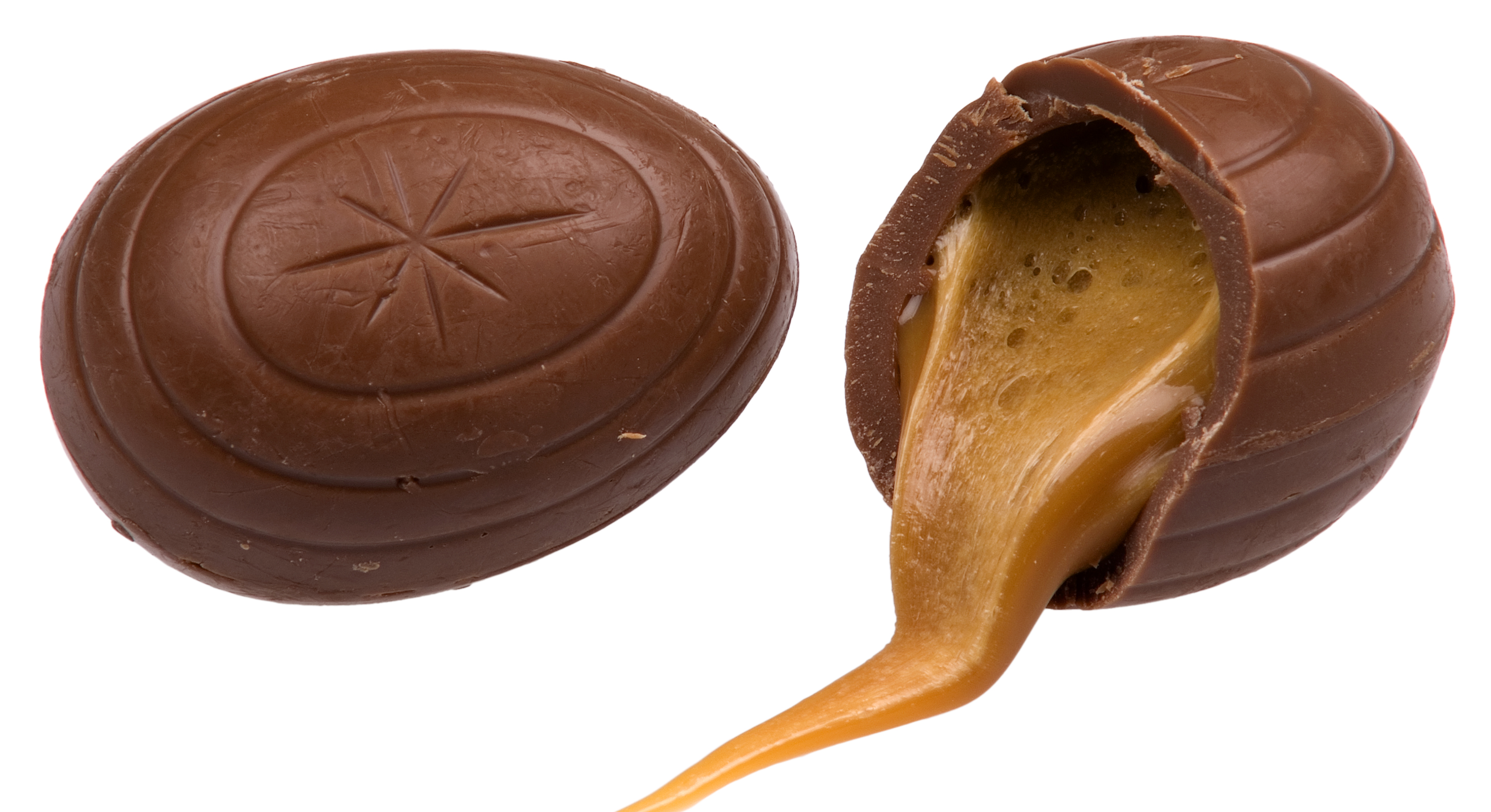
Cadbury Caramel Eggs, whole and split

Cadbury has introduced many variants to the original Creme Egg, including:

| Name | Year launched | Notes | Ref. |
|---|---|---|---|
| Border Creme Egg | 1970 | The first flavour extension of the Creme Egg. It contained a creamy chocolate fondant filling, with its tartan foil packaging featuring various colours. It was first sold as Fry's Border Creme Egg before being renamed as Cadbury's in 1974. They were discontinued in 1981. | |
| Mini Creme Egg | 1989 | Smaller bite-sized versions of the standard Creme Egg. | |
| Berry Creme Eggs | 1987 | Contained pink-coloured berry-flavoured fondant, with magenta-coloured foil. They were only sold in Australia for a short time. | |
| Double Chocolate Creme Egg | Late-1980s | Almost the same as the Border Creme Eggs, containing chocolate-flavoured fondant. They were only sold in New Zealand until the 1990s. | |
| Caramel Egg | 1994 | A variant containing Caramel instead of fondant. They have also been sold as "Dairy Milk Caramel Egg" during 2003–2012. They are also available in the United States, Canada (as "Caramilk Egg") and Australia. | |
| Mini Caramel Egg | 1994 | Smaller bite-sized versions of the Caramel Egg. | |
| Creme Chicks | 1995 | A variant of the standard Creme Egg shaped like the Chick mascot. | |
| Caramilk Egg | 1990s | This New Zealand variant replicates the style of Caramilk, with the shell containing a mixture of caramel and white chocolate and the filling being of a similar type. | |
| Dream Egg | N/A | Another New Zealand-exclusive variant. It featured a white chocolate shell with a white chocolate fondant filling. They were discontinued in 2010 after the manufacturing of the standard Creme Eggs moved to the United Kingdom, due to an inability to source these products over there. | |
| Mad About Chocolate Egg | N/A | Only sold in Australia and New Zealand, this variant contained a chocolate fudge filling and was wrapped up in purple foil. It was discontinued in 2010 after the manufacturing of the standard Creme Eggs moved to the United Kingdom, due to an inability to source these products over there. | |
| Peppermint Egg | N/A | Another variant only sold in New Zealand, it featured a minty creme centre, and was also discontinued in 2010 for the same reasons as the other New Zealand-exclusive eggs. | |
| Chocolate Creme Eggs | 1999 | Another alternative take on the Border Creme Eggs, manufactured and sold in the United States by The Hershey Company. | |
| Giant Creme Egg | N/A | A thick chocolate shell with white and caramel fondant filling. Manufactured in North America. Discontinued in 2006. | |
| Creme Egg McFlurry | 2001 | A standard McDonald's McFlurry with a Creme Egg fondant sauce and sprinkled chocolate. It is available in the United Kingdom, historically as part of McDonald's' Monopoly promotions (which has not been during spring since 2019). It is also available in Ireland, and has also been sold in Canada and Australia at a time. | |
| Dairy Milk with Creme Egg | 2006 | A Cadbury Dairy Milk chocolate bar with a Creme Egg-flavoured centre. It was sold in the United Kingdom for two years, being discontinued in 2007. It was later sold in New Zealand. | |
| Orange Creme Egg | 2007 | Contained orange-flavoured fondant and chocolate. Manufactured and sold in the United States by The Hershey Company. | |
| Holiday Ornament Creme Egg | 2007 | The same as a standard Creme Egg sold in the United States, but with Christmas-themed packaging. Manufactured and sold in the United States by The Hershey Company. | |
| Creme Egg Twisted | 2008 | A chocolate bar paying homage to the standard Creme Egg. No longer sold, but a smaller variant is currently available in Cadbury Heroes. It was also introduced to Australia in 2010 but was quickly discontinued. | |
| Screme Egg | 2010 | A variant of the standard Creme Egg with a green yolk instead of a yellow one. They were first sold in the UK in 2010, and were available every Halloween until 2015. They were also sold in Canada beginning in 2012, and in the United States soon afterwards. | |
| Screme Egg Minis | 2011 | Bite-size mini versions of the Screme Egg. | |
| Creme Egg Splats | 2012 | fried egg shaped pieces of milk chocolate filled with fondant. Sold in the UK. | |
| Fudgee-O Egg | 2015 | A Canadian-exclusive variant with a fudge creme centre. | |
| Oreo Egg | 2016 (Canada); 2019 (United Kingdom) | Initially exclusive to Canada before being released in the United Kingdom, this variant contains a white cream centre with Oreo cookie crumbs. | |
| Ghost Egg/Goo Heads | 2016 | Another Halloween variant, but this time lacking any yolk. Sold in the UK. | |
| Chips Ahoy! Egg | 2017 | A Canadian-exclusive variant with a chocolate chip cookie dough centre. | |
| White Creme Egg | 2018 | A variant with a white chocolate shell. First released in 2018 as part of a UK promotion, it was made a permanent part of the Easter range in 2023. | |
| Golden Creme Egg | 2021 | A variant with golden-coloured chocolate. Released in 2021 as part of the 50th Anniversary of the product under Cadbury's ownership. | |
| Salted Caramel Egg | 2023 | A variant of the standard Caramel Egg with salted caramel filling. | |

Other products include:

- Creme Egg Fondant in a narrow cardboard tube (limited edition)
- Creme Egg ice cream with a fondant sauce in milk chocolate
- Creme Egg Pots of Joy – melted Cadbury milk chocolate with a fondant layer
- Screme Egg Pots of Joy – melted Cadbury milk chocolate but with a layer of Screme Egg fondant
- Creme Egg Layers of Joy – A layered sharing dessert with Cadbury milk chocolate, chocolate mousse, chocolate chip cookie and fondant dessert with a creamy topping.
- Jaffa Egg – Manufactured in New Zealand, Dark chocolate with orange filling
- Marble Egg – Manufactured in New Zealand, Dairy Milk and Dream Chocolate swirled together
