= Creme Egg Twisted =

British Cadbury Chocolate Bar

Cadbury Creme Egg Twisted

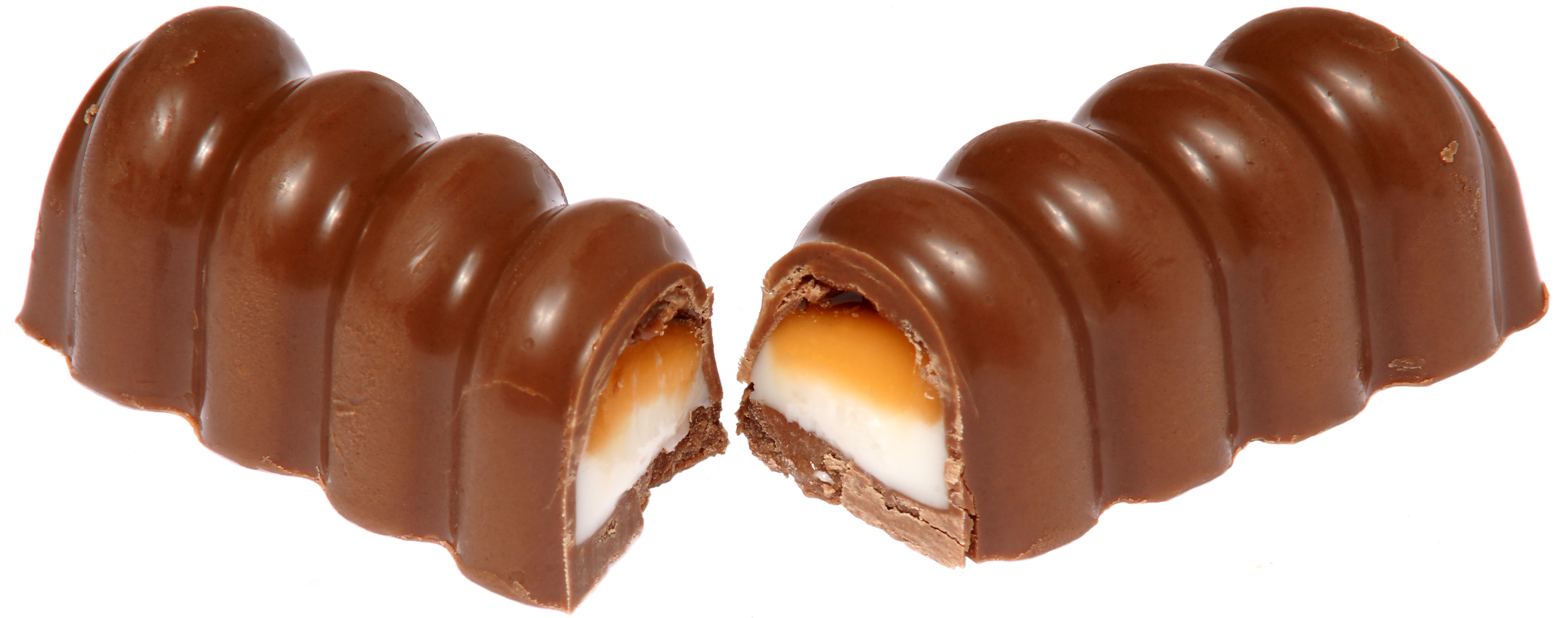
- Product type: Confectionery
- Current owner: Cadbury UK
- Country: United Kingdom
- Introduced: 2008
- Related brands: List of Cadbury products
- Markets: World
- Website: cadbury.co.uk/creme-egg

The Cadbury Creme Egg Twisted was a chocolate bar produced by Cadbury UK in the United Kingdom. It was a milk chocolate bar with a filling of Cadbury Creme Egg fondant. Introduced in 2008, it was a result of Cadbury researching that customers wanted the Creme Egg to be available all year, mainly for the fondant centre rather than the egg shape. Previously, the fondant Creme Egg center was available as a filling in the Cadbury Dairy Milk line, but that has since then been phased out with the Creme Egg Twisted replacing it. Currently, only the Cadbury Heroes mini variation is available in the UK.

During 2011, the bar was introduced to Australia, but was pulled from stores several months later due to low popularity.

In 2023, some twisted minis were sold with an unmarked filling swap, replacing the egg filling with Cadbury's strawberry cream.

== Advertising ==
In May 2008, an advertisement screened on ITV and Channel 4 in the United Kingdom, featured in various ways a creme egg being melted while still in its wrapper (there were various versions of the commercial), only to mutate into a Twisted while yelling "Goo!" at random intervals and "spitting" out some of its goo, before repeating the word again when the advert finishes.

== Types ==
Creme Egg Twisted

- Milk chocolate with a soft fondant Creme Egg centre
- Launched 2007, discontinued 2012, secretly relaunched 2013 and discontinued again

Creme Egg Twisted Minis

- A small chocolate parcel with a soft fondant yellow and white Creme Egg filling.
- Launched 2009
- Availability varies; in some markets may still appear in Cadbury Heroes assortments or sharing packs

== See also ==
- Cadbury Creme Egg
- Cadbury Dairy Milk
- Cadbury
- Easter
