= Aztec (chocolate bar) =

Chocolate bar by Cadbury's

- Product type: Chocolate bar
- Current owner: Cadbury
- Country: United Kingdom
- Introduced: 1967; 59 years ago
- Discontinued: 1978; 48 years ago
- Tagline: A feast of a bar

Aztec was a chocolate bar produced by Cadbury's from 1967. It was made of nougat and caramel covered with milk chocolate and was sold in a deep purple wrapper. The Aztec was created by Cadbury's to compete with the Mars Bar, but it was discontinued in 1978.

The Aztec was briefly revived as Aztec 2000 in 2000, but was discontinued again soon after.

The Moro is a similar Cadbury product, first sold in New Zealand in the 1960s, that was a much more successful competitor to the Mars Bar.
