= Double Decker (chocolate bar) =

British brand of chocolate bar

- Type: Confectionery
- Course: Sweet Snack
- Place of origin: United Kingdom
- Invented: 1975
- Food energy (per 100 g serving): 459 kcal (1,920 kJ)
Nutritional value
(per 100 g serving)
- Protein: 4 g
- Fat: 17 g
- Carbohydrate: 71 g
- Similar dishes: List of Cadbury products

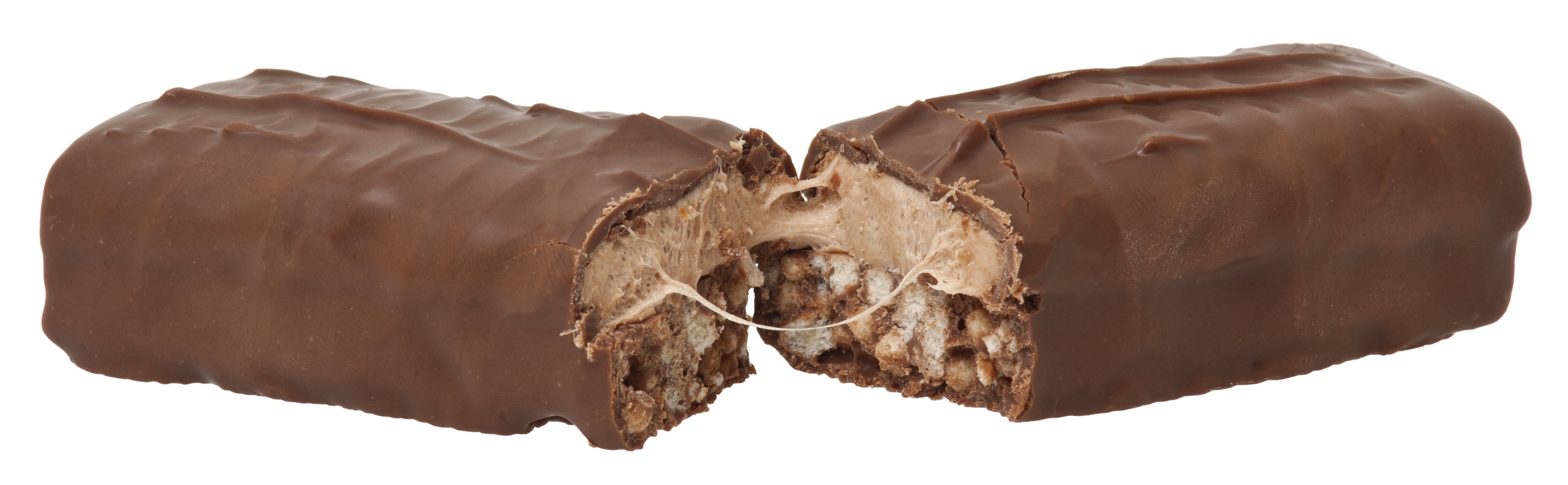
A Double Decker split in half

Double Decker is a brand of chocolate bar manufactured by British company Cadbury, first introduced in 1976. Its name derives from the well-known double-decker bus, with the buses themselves sometimes appearing in advertisements for the product. It is a mixture of milk chocolate, nougat with a hint of coffee, and crisp, crunchy cereal. This has proved to be a very popular recipe, being used in cakes and other confections. The Double Decker is manufactured in Poland since 2011.

== Description ==
The chocolate bar is structured in two layers: a lightly whipped nougat layer with a hint of coffee, with a lower layer of cereal 'crispies', which are then coated in milk chocolate. Originally the bar contained raisins within the base layer; however, consumer research in the mid-1980s led to these being removed and the new formulation being introduced. Television advertisements in the 1970s featured Willie Rushton before a mascot named Dougie the Double Decker Dog was introduced.

The bar has a mass of approximately 54.5g, although multipack bars are smaller at 37.3g. Previously, each bar was 42g in the 1970s and 51g in the 1980s, and peaked at 60g. A 54.5g bar typically contains 9.9g of fat, 38g of carbohydrates, 2.3g of protein and 1060kJ (250kcal) of energy. The Double Decker no longer contains hydrogenated oil.

== Variants ==
A Double Decker – Nuts version launched in 2004, which had the advertising slogan "crispy, crunchy, chewy and nutty". This chocolate bar was essentially a Double Decker with nuts contained within the nougat layer; however, it has since been discontinued. At the time it was distinctly aimed at males, and featured in Coronation Street credits during 2004. In August 2016 Cadbury launched Dinky Deckers as part of the Bite Size bag range which are mini Cadbury Double Deckers available in a 120g pouch bag.

== See also ==
- List of chocolate bar brands
