= Cadbury Eclairs =

Brand of confectionery by Cadbury

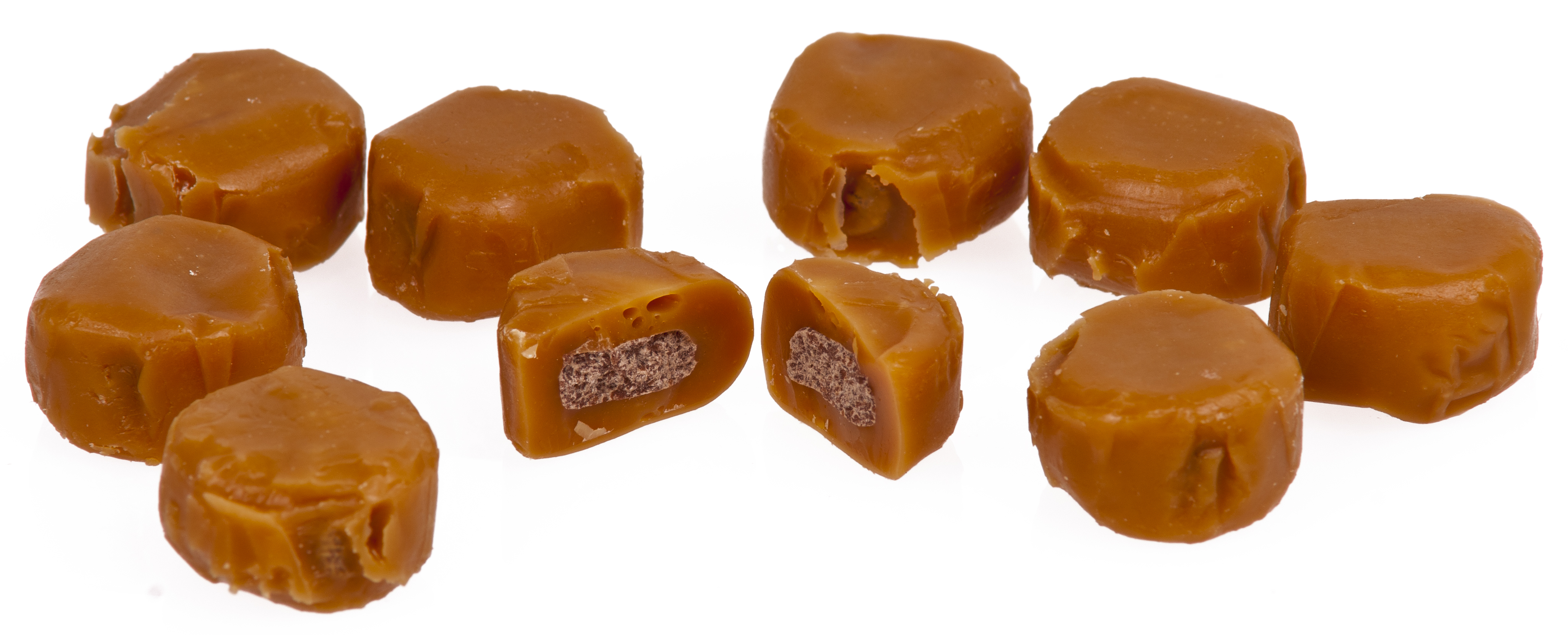
Cadbury Eclairs

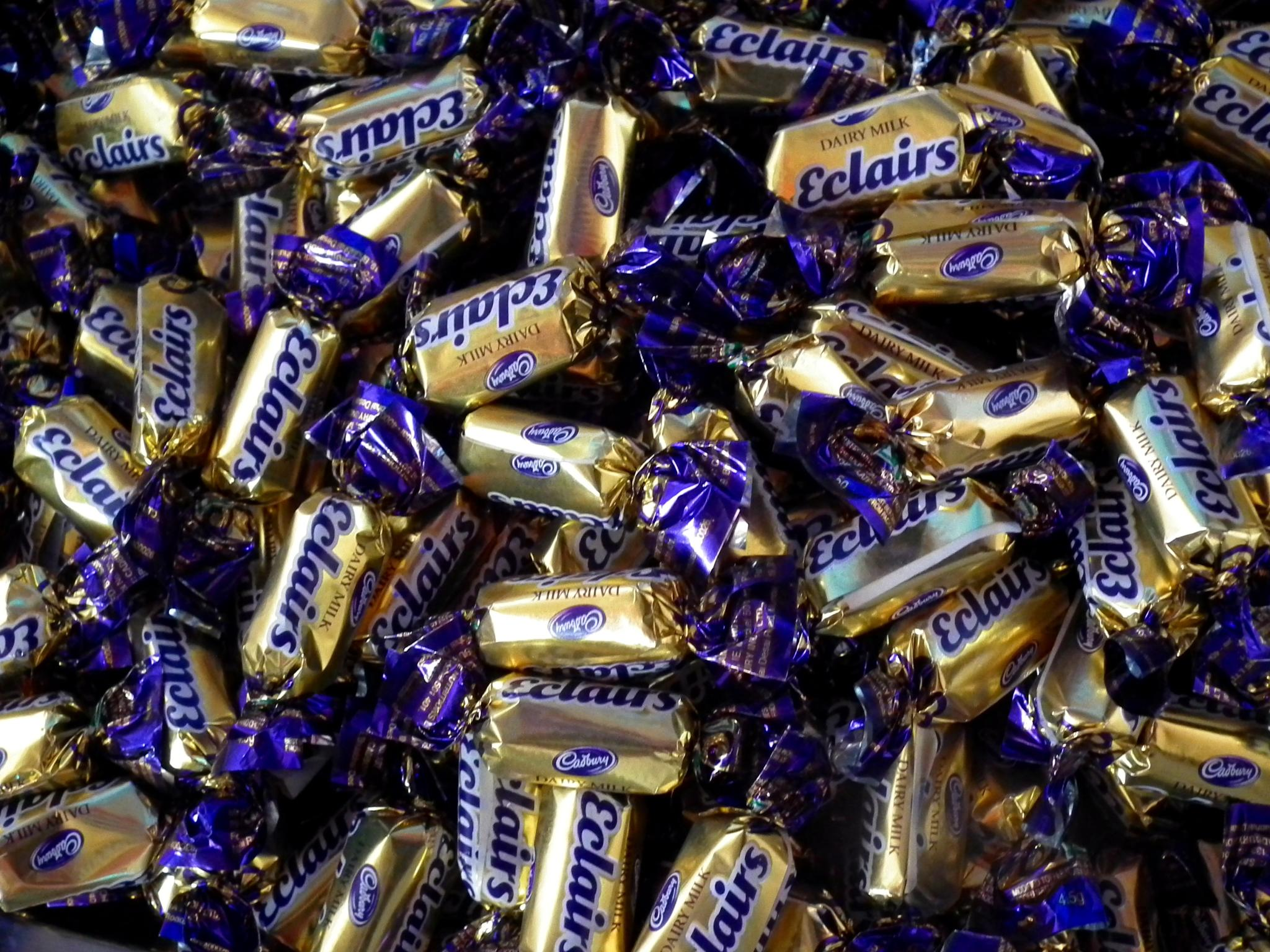
Eclairs in wrapper

Cadbury Eclairs are a confectionery currently manufactured by Cadbury. Invented by the Birmingham-based confectionery company Taveners in 1932, they were adapted into a Dairy Milk version of Eclairs in 1965. They are available in bags or rolls and can be found in the plastic tubs of Cadbury Heroes selection. Eclairs are currently available in the United Kingdom, Ireland, Australia, Kenya, Hong Kong, China, South Africa, India, and Pakistan, where they are known as "Dairy Milk Eclairs". In 2013 Mondelēz International updated the UK ingredients list to add in the inclusion of palm oil in the recipe. In 2013 Cadbury rebranded its product to Choclairs in India.

== Current products ==
- Cadbury Eclairs: Cadbury milk chocolate encased in a chewy caramel. Launched 1965.
- Cadbury Eclairs Orange Twist: Orange flavour Cadbury milk chocolate encased in a chewy caramel. Launched 2013.
- Cadbury Eclairs Hazelnut Twist: Hazelnut flavour Cadbury milk chocolate encased in chewy caramel. Launched 2013.
- Cadbury Eclairs Velvets: soft caramel with a chocolatey centre, encased in Cadbury milk chocolate. Launched 2014.
- Cadbury Eclairs Velvets Coffee: soft coffee flavour caramel with a chocolate centre, covered in Cadbury milk chocolate. Launched in 2014, exclusive to Tesco.

== China ==
Cadbury began manufacturing Eclairs in China in 1996 at a time that the Cadbury brand was struggling to gain market share. Individually wrapped sweets were popular in China, and the confections gained popularity, integrating into Chinese gift-giving culture including as gifts to wedding guests. By 2000, Eclairs accounted for half of Cadbury's sales in China.
