= Fudge (chocolate bar) =

Brand of chocolate bar by Cadbury

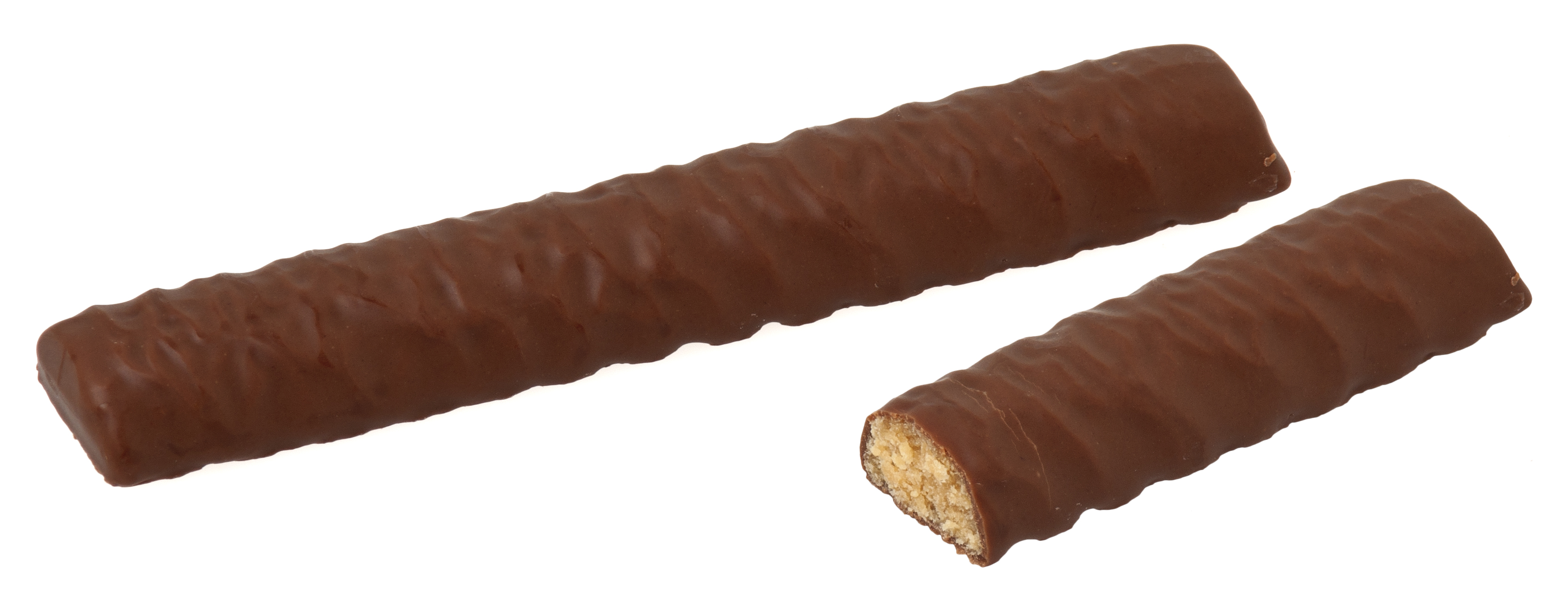
- Product type: Confectionery (fudge)
- Current owner: Cadbury
- Country: United Kingdom
- Introduced: 1948; 78 years ago
- Related brands: List of Cadbury products

Fudge is a brand of chocolate bar manufactured by Cadbury. It is a bar of fudge in a semi-circular cross-section covered in a layer of milk chocolate. Produced in small bite size bars and in larger bars, the Fudge continues to be produced and sold in countries such as the United Kingdom and Ireland. It was launched in 1948, originally under the name Milk Fudge which later became simply Fudge.

== Production ==
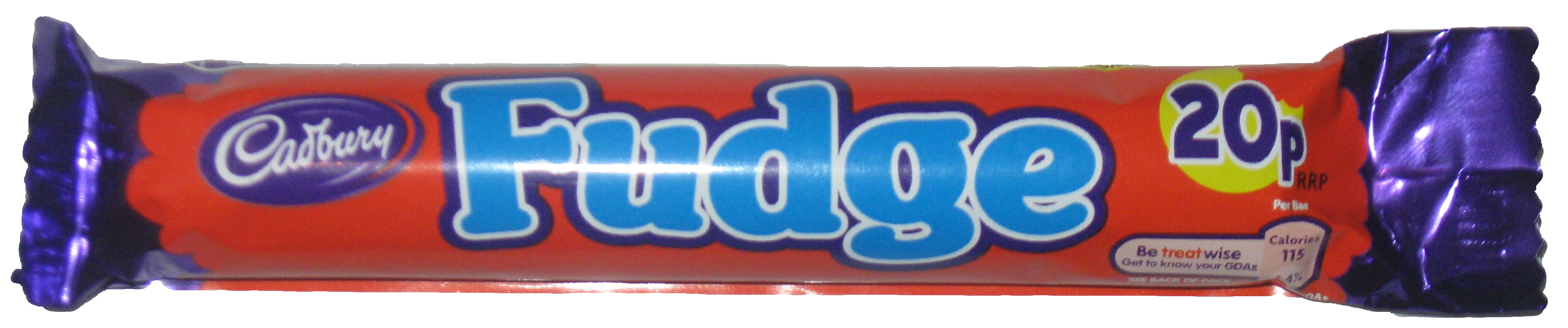
Fudge in 2014

In November/December 2010, production of Fudge was transferred to Cadbury's new plant in Skarbimierz-Osiedle, Poland from the Keynsham Cadbury's plant in Somerset. Labels for these products do not state a country of origin, instead stating "Made in the EU under licence from Cadbury UK Ltd".

== Advertising ==
The jingle for the 1970s television advert was written by Mike d'Abo. Said jingle was sung by eight year old Clive Griffin, who also sang the jingle 'if you like a lot of chocolate' for Club. It appeared on 'The 100 Greatest TV Ads' in May 2000 on Channel 4.

== See also ==
- List of chocolate bar brands
