= Dream (chocolate bar) =

Brand of white chocolate

- Product type: Confectionery
- Current owner: Mondelez International
- Introduced: 2001; 25 years ago (Australia & New Zealand) 2002; 24 years ago (United Kingdom) 2019 (as 'Cadbury White')
- Related brands: List of Cadbury products

Dream (Cadbury White in the UK) is a brand of white chocolate by Cadbury. It is no longer sold under that name in the UK, though it is still manufactured in this form in Australia, New Zealand, and South Africa.

The bar was relaunched in the UK in 2019 under a new name 'Cadbury White'.

This was Cadbury Dream's fourth rebrand, retiring the old Cadbury logo that the wrappers had used since its launch 22 years earlier. The new style featured a new logo in line with the Cadbury's 2020 logo.

== History ==
Dream underwent four years of technical development before being brought to market. It was first launched in Australia and New Zealand in 2001. According to Cadbury, the product became one of the top five block chocolate brands in New Zealand and had driven growth in the overall chocolate market. In 2002, the product was launched in the United Kingdom and Canada and was featured as part of Cadbury's sponsorship for Coronation Street. It was targeted in the UK at 25–34-year-old women, who had previously been consumers of Milkybar. At the time, few white chocolates in the UK were aimed at the adult market. By 2010, Marketing Week described Dream as failing to meet Cadbury's expectations for the adult market.

Dream was relaunched under a new name in the UK and Ireland in 2019 as 'Cadbury White'. It was sold exclusively at Asda and had poor reviews as of September 2019. In October 2019, Cadbury planned to release a special edition white Christmas chocolate block in Australia. In May 2020 it was relaunched in the UK as part of the B&M Cadbury Australia Chocolate promotions it is sold along with Cadbury Dairy Milk Top Deck, Crispy Mint Creme, and Moro Bars and 2 flavours of the Cadbury Old Gold Bars (including Roast Almond and Peppermint) and later additions Cadbury Caramilk Bars and Cadbury Twirl Caramilk Bars and Australian Cadbury Dairy Milk Turkish Delight Bars were later added on sale at B&M.

== See also ==
- List of chocolate bar brands
