= Caramilk =

Chocolate brand by Cadbury

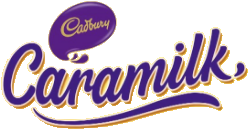
- Australian Caramilk logo
- Type: Chocolate bar
- Created by: Cadbury
- Invented: 1968; 58 years ago
- Similar dishes: List of Cadbury products

Caramilk is a brand name used for two distinct chocolate bar products made by Cadbury. The Canadian version of Caramilk is a milk chocolate bar filled with caramel and it was introduced in 1938. In Australia (also available in New Zealand, the UK and Ireland) the Caramilk brand is used for a caramelised white chocolate bar.

Similar chocolate bars to the Canadian version of Caramilk are marketed as Cadbury Caramello in the United States, as Cadbury Dairy Milk Caramello in Australia and New Zealand, and as Cadbury Dairy Milk Caramel in the UK.

== Variations ==
Variations available, some of them limited editions, include Caramilk made with dark chocolate, maple flavoured, chocolate flavoured, or cappuccino. A thicker version called Caramilk Thick has also been introduced.

== Production ==
Canadian Caramilk bars are produced at one location, the company's Gladstone Chocolate Factory in Toronto.

== Ingredients ==
Caramilk bars contain unsweetened chocolate and cocoa butter but are labelled as candy since only solid chocolate bars may be labelled as chocolate bars in Canada.

== Advertising campaigns ==
One of the advertising campaigns for Caramilk bars revolved around the question of how the centre of the confection was put into the chocolate flavoured exterior. This theme led to the production of over fifteen separate television advertisements since the candy was introduced, making the series one of the most productive advertising efforts in Canadian history. The "Caramilk Secret" ad campaign was conceived by Gary Prouk when he was at Doyle Dane Bernbach. When Prouk left DDB to join Scali McCabe Sloves, the Cadbury account went with him. One notable advertisement involved two cone head aliens who were complimenting each other on successfully concealing the secret from humans, and also creating some of earth's other long-standing works of wonder (e.g. the pyramids).

Another ad, featuring Leonardo da Vinci drawing the Mona Lisa as she eats a Caramilk, has won a Clio award.

== Similar products ==
=== Cadbury Dairy Milk Caramel ===
In the United Kingdom and the Republic of Ireland, a bar similar in premise (caramel-filled chocolate) but differing slightly in taste, shape, ingredients and packaging is sold as Cadbury Dairy Milk Caramel.

Caramello

=== Cadbury Dairy Milk Caramello (Australia and New Zealand) ===
In Australia and New Zealand, a caramel-filled milk chocolate covered bar similar to the Canadian and United Kingdom product is sold as the Caramello variant of the Cadbury Dairy Milk line of blocks.

=== Cadbury Caramello (United States) ===
In the United States, a similar bar (which has been produced under license by The Hershey Company since 1988) is sold under the brand Cadbury's Caramello. It gained popularity in the 1980s when advertising to children with the slogan, "I was right in the middle of a Caramello when I found gold."

== Australia, New Zealand, UK and Ireland ==
Australian Caramilk bars were introduced in 1968 and discontinued in 1994. The product was reintroduced in New Zealand as a limited edition of one million bars in 2017. The product was then reintroduced in Australia as a limited edition in 2018, 2019 and 2020. In 2021, the product was launched in the UK, and Ireland.

=== Variations ===
Variations available in Australia include a limited-edition Dairy Milk Caramilk Top Deck (a milk chocolate bar topped with Caramilk), Caramilk Marble (marbled milk chocolate and Caramilk with a hazelnut praline filling) and Caramilk flavoured Philadelphia cream cheese.

In 2020, Cadbury launched Caramilk Hokey Pokey in New Zealand; this consists of Caramilk with honeycomb toffee pieces.
