= Time Out (chocolate bar) =

Chocolate bar

- An old Time Out before 2016 relaunch
- Product type: Confectionery
- Current owner: Cadbury
- Introduced: 1992
- Related brands: List of Cadbury products
- Tagline: The wafer break with a layer of Flake
- Website: https://www.cadbury.co.uk/products/brands/timeout-bar/

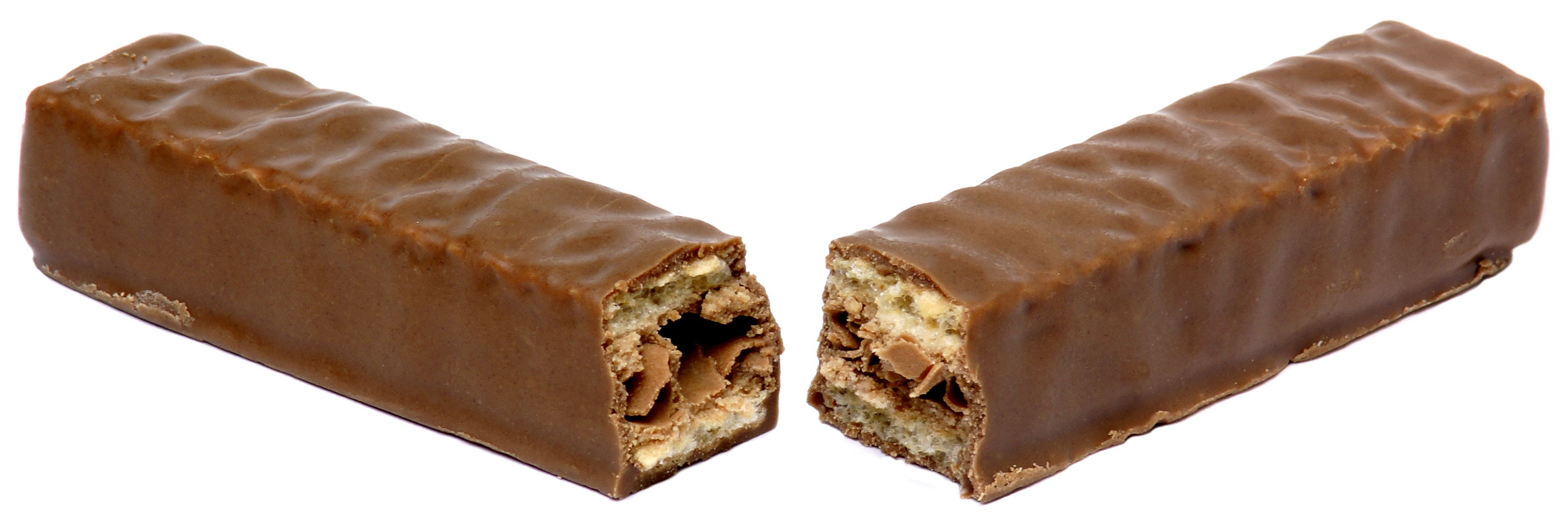
A Time Out split in half

Time Out is a brand of chocolate covered wafer, originally manufactured by Cadbury and first introduced in 1992. Mainly sold in pairs, it consists of milk chocolate between two wafers, coated in Dairy Milk milk chocolate. .. Cadbury stopped making Time Out in 2016, and replaced it with a slimline single-finger version called the Time Out Wafer.

== History ==
The bar was sold in several countries around the world. It was introduced to Britain and Ireland in 1992, and then in Australia and New Zealand in 1995. The bar was originally sold under the slogan "the wafer break with a layer of Flake" and was called a "light snack" by Cadbury.

It was given a new look in 2010 with lighter blue packaging and was given a new slogan, "Everyone needs some Time Out", but shortly after reverted to the previously used dark-blue shade.

In February 2015, the company announced that production of Time Out would be transferred from Ireland to Poland. Sales of Time Out had been in decline for several years.

Due to declining sales, the original Time Out had been discontinued by 2016. In the British market, it was replaced with a single-bar version called Time Out Wafer that has more wafer and less chocolate than the original Time Out. The new version has since been renamed to simply Time Out.

== Size ==
When Time Out was first introduced, it was a substantial snack (about 25 grams), then it was downsized to 20.2 g. The single-finger bar had shrunk down to 16 g before it was The main twin-finger bar had a combined weight of 32 g (40 g for Australia and New Zealand) and is suitable for vegetarians.

== Products ==
- Cadbury Time Out
- Cadbury Time Out Chunky
- Cadbury Time Out Mint Chunky
- Cadbury Time Out Orange
- Cadbury Time Out Coffee
- Cadbury Time Out Wafer
- Cadbury Time Out Roundie

== See also ==
- List of chocolate bar brands
