= Picnic (chocolate bar) =

British chocolate bar

Cadbury Picnic

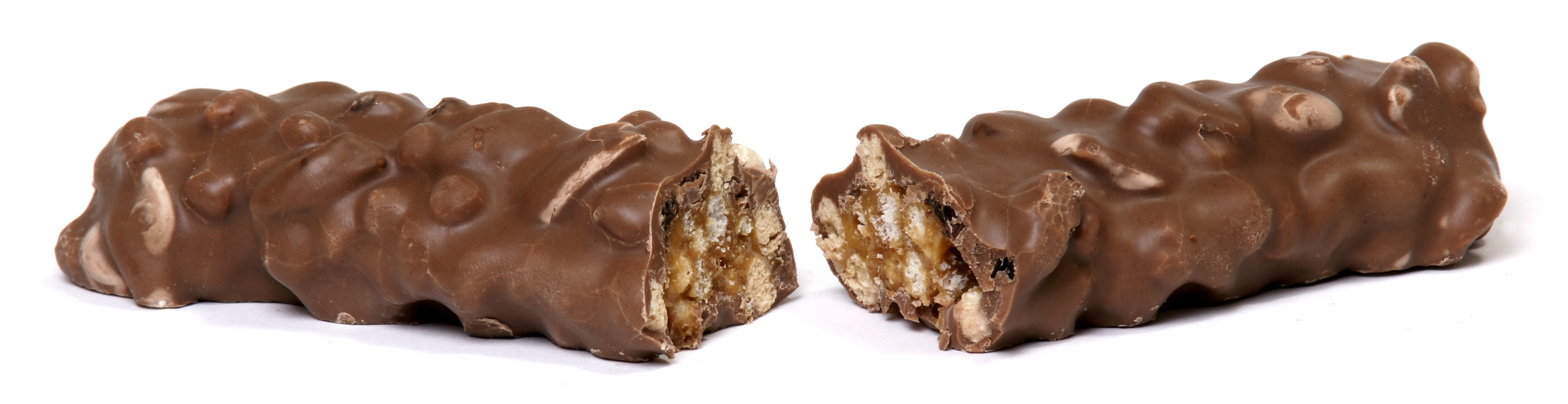
- A British/Irish Picnic split in half
- Product type: chocolate bar
- Current owner: Mondelez International
- Produced by: Cadbury
- Country: Australia
- Introduced: Australia 1950; 76 years ago United Kingdom 1958; 68 years ago
- Website: cadbury.co.uk/picnic

Picnic is a brand of chocolate bar consisting of milk chocolate and peanuts, covering chewy nougat, caramel, biscuit and puffed rice. Originally launched by MacRobertson's Confectionery in Australia in 1950, today it is manufactured by Cadbury. Picnic bars are lumpy in shape. It is sold in a number of countries around the world. The British, German, Irish and Indian versions differ from the Australasian version in that they also contain raisins.

== History ==
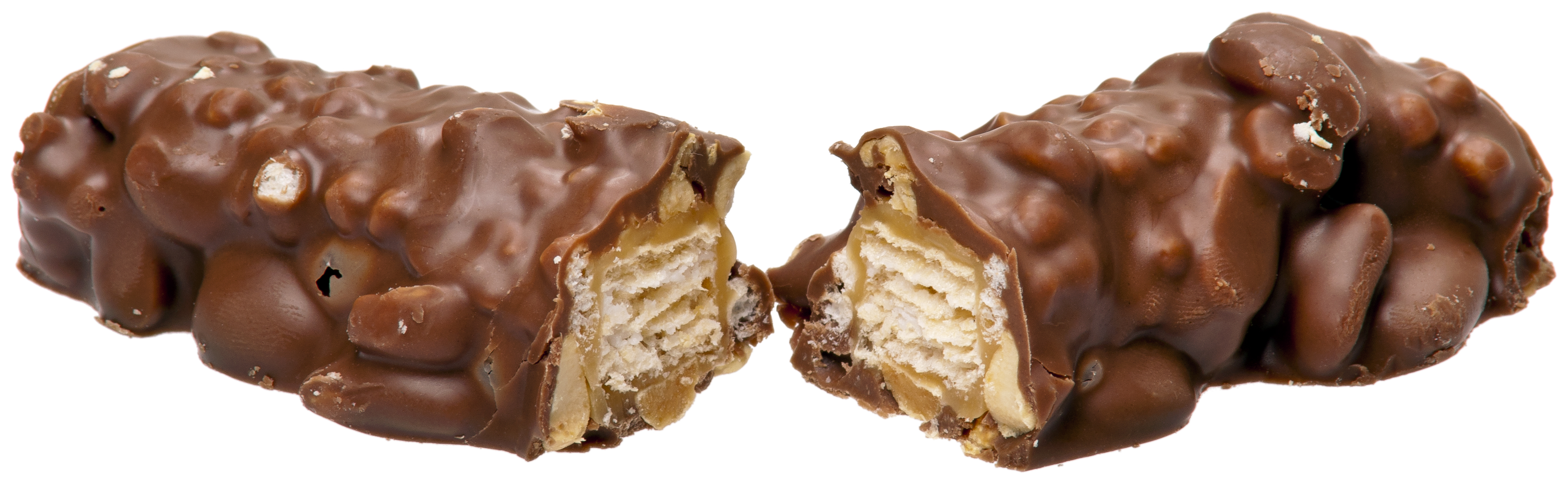
Inside Australian & New Zealand Picnic

The MacRobertson's Picnic bar was first released in Australia in 1950. Fry's, which was part of Cadbury launched a Picnic bar in 1958. In 1967, Cadbury acquired MacRobertson Chocolates. The move gave Cadbury another major manufacturing base on the Australian mainland - at Ringwood in Melbourne, Victoria. It also added a range of unique confectionery brands, including Old Gold (launched in 1919), Picnic, Cherry Ripe (created in 1924) and Freddo Frog (created in 1930), which were household names.

In April 2009 Cadbury altered the weight of the standard Picnic bar from 50 grams down to 48.4 grams. Again in August 2014 Cadbury altered the weight of the standard Picnic bar down to 46g in Australia, with a noticeable reduction in the width of the bar, yet still in the old size wrapper.

== Variants ==
In Australia, limited-edition variants Picnic Honeycomb (a Picnic bar with honeycomb pieces), Picnic Hedgehog (a picnic bar with biscuit pieces) and Picnic Rocky Road (a Picnic bar with mini marshmallows and gumdrops) have been sold in recent years. In 2010, a limited edition Almond Picnic bar was made available in New Zealand and is now also available in Australia under the name Roast Almond Feast. In 2011, a fruit and nut picnic bar was released in Australia.

Now in Russia as of 2018, there are two variants of the bar available, classic one with peanuts and raisins and another one with walnuts, at first released as of limited-edition but later included in the permanent line.

== Advertisement ==
During the 1970s the Australian slogan for Picnic was "More like a banquet than a picnic". In the early 1990s, a UK television commercial featured a singing camel called Calvin, in which the Animatronic camel performed a parody of "My Coo Ca Choo" originally by Alvin Stardust. The lyrics describe the ingredients of the chocolate bar, chants of the words “Chew” and “Goo” while a series of captions appear during the course of the advert, parodying The Chart Show who would display random captions offering facts on the artist and tour dates, while the music video plays. The tagline of the commercial was “There’s no goo in it when Calvin’s chewin’ it”. The commercial also had airtime in Russia and Ukraine, with the fact-captions translated.

A marketing slogan for the Picnic, released in the early 2000s, was "Deliciously ugly".

== See also ==
- List of chocolate bar brands
