= Cadbury =

British multinational confectionery company

- Current logo in use since 2020
- Formerly: Cadbury's (1824–2003); Cadbury Schweppes (1969–2008)
- Type: Subsidiary
- Traded as: LSE: CBRY (2008–2010)
- Industry: Confectionery
- Founded: 4 March 1824; 202 years ago in Birmingham, England
- Founder: John Cadbury
- Headquarters: Uxbridge Business Park, Denham, Buckinghamshire, England
- Key people: Dirk Van de Put (chairman and CEO)
- Brands: List of Cadbury brands
- Parent: Mondelez International (2010–present)
- Website: cadbury.co.uk

Cadbury (formerly Cadbury's and Cadbury Schweppes) is a British multinational confectionery company owned by Mondelez International (spun off from Kraft Foods) since 2010. It is the second-largest confectionery brand in the world, after Mars. Cadbury is internationally headquartered in Buckinghamshire, and operates in more than 50 countries worldwide. It is known for its Dairy Milk chocolate, the Creme Egg and Roses selection box, and other confectionery products. One of the best-known British brands, in 2013 The Daily Telegraph named Cadbury among Britain's most successful exports.

Cadbury was founded in 1824 in Birmingham, England, by John Cadbury (1801–1889), a Quaker who sold tea, coffee and drinking chocolate. Cadbury developed the business with his brother Benjamin, followed by his sons Richard and George. George developed the Bournville estate, a model village designed to give the company's workers improved living conditions. Dairy Milk chocolate, introduced by George Jr in 1905, used a higher proportion of milk in the recipe than rival products. By 1914, it was the company's best-selling product. Successive members of the Cadbury family have made innovations with chocolate products. Cadbury, Rowntree's and Fry's were the big three British confectionery manufacturers throughout much of the 19th and 20th centuries.

Cadbury was granted its first royal warrant from Queen Victoria in 1854. It held a royal warrant from Elizabeth II from 1955 to 2022. Cadbury merged with J. S. Fry & Sons in 1919, and Schweppes in 1969, known as Cadbury Schweppes until 2008, when the American beverage business was split as Dr Pepper Snapple Group; the rights ownership of the Schweppes brand had already differed between various countries since 2006. In 1992, Sir Adrian Cadbury, chairman of the company for 24 years, produced the Cadbury Report, a code of best practice which served as a basis for reform of corporate governance around the world. Cadbury was a constant constituent of the FTSE 100 on the London Stock Exchange from the index's 1984 inception until the company was bought by Kraft Foods Inc. in 2010.

== History ==
=== 1800–1900: Early history ===
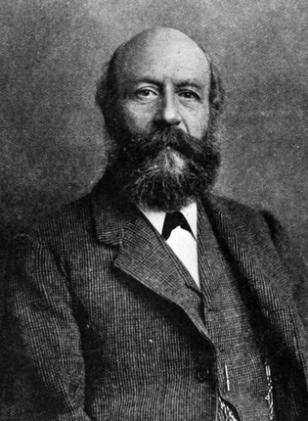
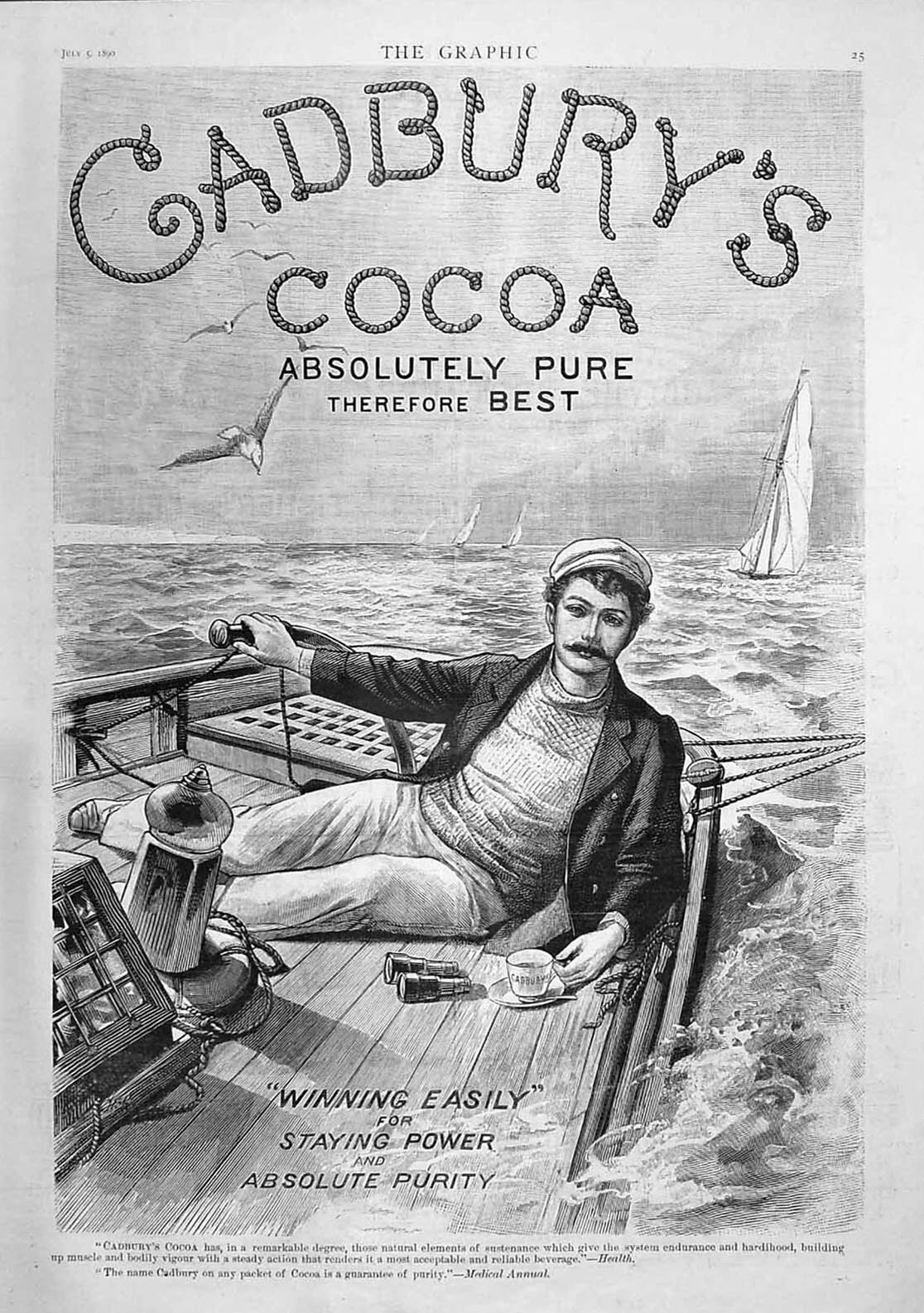
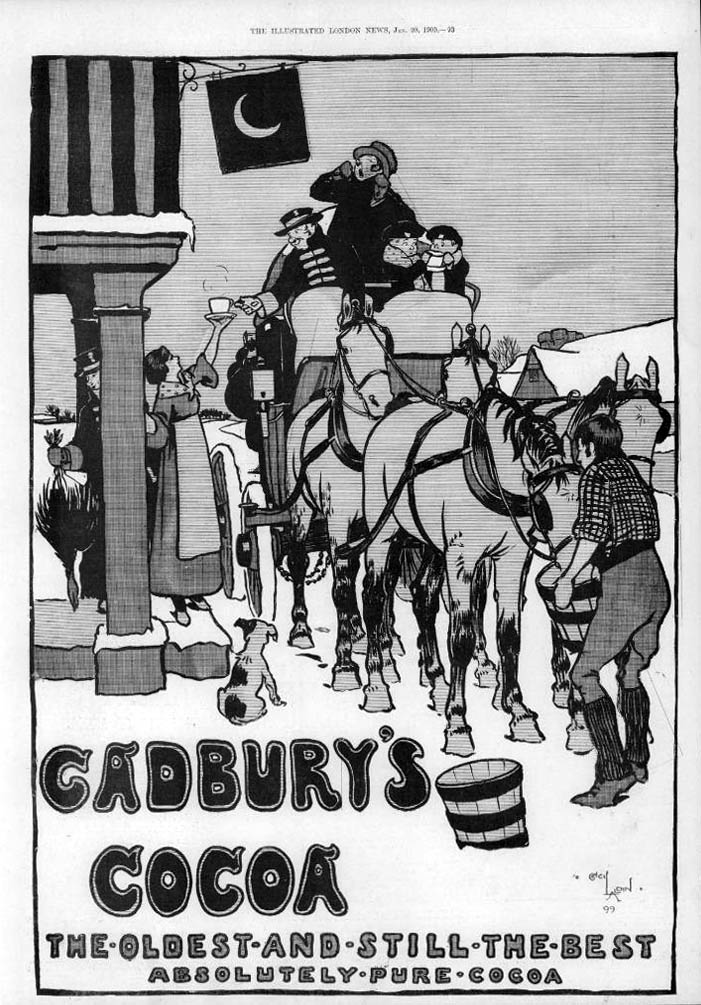
Cadbury was established in 1824 by John Cadbury (far left). Two advertisements for Cadbury's cocoa in British media: (middle) piece published in The Graphic, 1885; (right): 1900 illustration by Cecil Aldin for The Illustrated London News.

On 4 March 1824, John Cadbury, a Quaker, began selling tea, coffee and drinking chocolate in Bull Street in Birmingham, England. From 1831, he moved into the production of a variety of cocoa and drinking chocolates, made in a factory in Bridge Street and sold mainly to the wealthy because of the high cost of production. In 1842, he started selling chocolate for eating, perhaps the first in Britain. In 1847, John Cadbury became a partner with his brother Benjamin and the company became known as "Cadbury Brothers". In 1847, Cadbury's competitor Fry's of Bristol produced the first chocolate bar (which would be mass-produced as Fry's Chocolate Cream in 1866). Cadbury introduced his brand of the chocolate bar in 1849, and that same year, Cadbury and Fry's chocolate bars were displayed publicly at a trade fair in Bingley Hall, Birmingham. The Cadbury brothers opened an office in London, and, in 1854, they received the royal warrant as manufacturers of chocolate and cocoa to Queen Victoria. The firm began exporting its products in the 1850s but had started going into decline in the later half of the decade.

John Cadbury's sons Richard and George took over the business in 1861. At the time of the takeover, the business was in rapid decline: the number of employees had reduced from 20 to 11, and the company was losing money. By 1866, Cadbury was profitable again. The brothers had turned around the business by moving the focus from tea and coffee to chocolate, and by increasing the quality of their products.

Cadbury Factory in Bournville, an estate named by the Cadbury brothers, opened in 1879, which is located four miles (6.4 km) to the south of Birmingham, England

Number 1 Lodge, once the main factory entrance, was built in 1889. It was part of a village, financed by George Cadbury, for the workers of the factory.

The firm's first major breakthrough occurred in 1866, when Richard and George introduced an improved cocoa into Britain. A new cocoa press developed in the Netherlands removed some of the unpalatable cocoa butter from the cocoa bean. In 1861, the company created Fancy Boxes (a decorated box of chocolates) and, in 1868, they were sold in boxes in the shape of a heart for Valentine's Day. Boxes of filled chocolates quickly became associated with the holiday. Cadbury manufactured their first Easter egg in 1875, creating the modern chocolate Easter egg after developing a pure cocoa butter that could be moulded into smooth shapes. By 1893, Cadbury had 19 different varieties of chocolate Easter egg on sale.

In 1878, the brothers decided to build new premises in countryside four miles (6.4 km) from Birmingham. The move to the countryside was unprecedented in business. Better transport access for milk that was shipped inward by canal, and cocoa that was brought in by rail from London, Southampton and Liverpool docks was taken into consideration. With the development of the Birmingham West Suburban Railway along the path of the Worcester and Birmingham Canal, they acquired the Bournbrook estate, comprising 14.5 acres (5.9 ha) of countryside south of Birmingham. Located next to the Stirchley Street railway station, which itself was opposite the canal, they renamed the estate Bournville and opened the Bournville factory in 1879. In 1891, the Cadbury brothers filed a patent for a chocolate-coated biscuit.

In 1893, George Cadbury bought 120 acres (49 ha) of land close to the works and planned, at his own expense, a model village which would 'alleviate the evils of modern more cramped living conditions'. By 1900, the estate included 314 cottages and houses set on 330 acres (130 ha) of land. As the Cadbury family were Quakers, there were no pubs in the estate.

In 1897, following the lead of Swiss companies, Cadbury introduced its own line of milk chocolate bars. In 1899, Cadbury was incorporated as a private limited company at the Companies House in London.

=== 1900–1969 ===
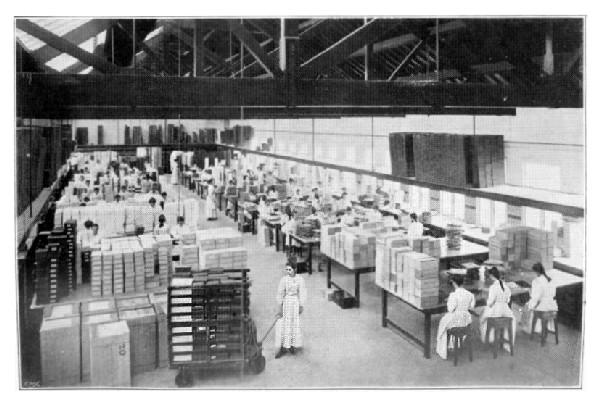
The packing room at Bournville, c. 1903.

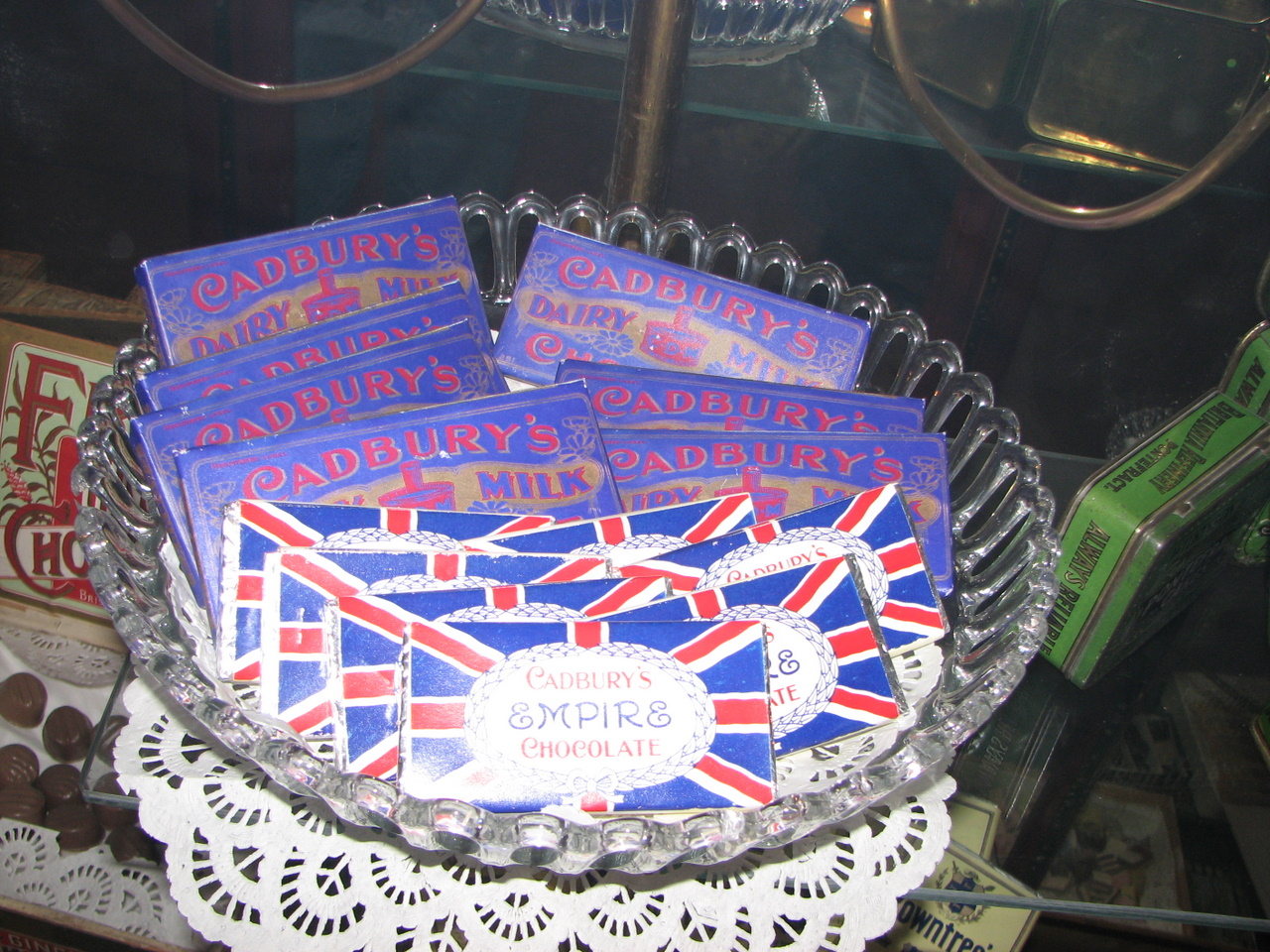
Cadbury's chocolate bars (Dairy Milk back of tray), c. 1910.

In 1905, Cadbury launched its Dairy Milk bar, a high quality product with a greater proportion of milk than previous chocolate bars. Developed by George's son, George Cadbury Jr (along with his research and development team), it was the first time a British company had been able to mass-produce milk chocolate. From the beginning, it had the distinctive purple wrapper. It was a great sales success, and became the company's best-selling product by 1914. The stronger Bournville Cocoa line was introduced in 1906. Cadbury Dairy Milk and Bournville Cocoa were to provide the basis for the company's rapid pre-war expansion. In 1910, Cadbury sales overtook those of Fry for the first time.

Cadbury's Milk Tray was first produced in 1915 and continued in production throughout the remainder of the First World War. More than 2,000 of Cadbury's male employees joined the British Armed Forces, and to support the British war effort, Cadbury provided chocolate, books and clothing to the troops. George Cadbury handed over two company-owned buildings for use as hospitals – "The Beeches" and "Fircroft", and the management of both hospitals earned the War Office's highest award. Factory girls, dubbed 'The Cadbury Angels', volunteered to do the laundry of injured soldiers recovering in the hospitals. After the war, the Bournville factory was redeveloped and mass production began in earnest. In 1918, Cadbury opened their first overseas factory in Hobart, Tasmania. A trainline was also built for easier access to Hobart. Of the 16 women who came to Tasmania to set up the factory, seven are known to have returned to the UK, two married and stayed in Tasmania, two did not marry but stayed and five left no record.

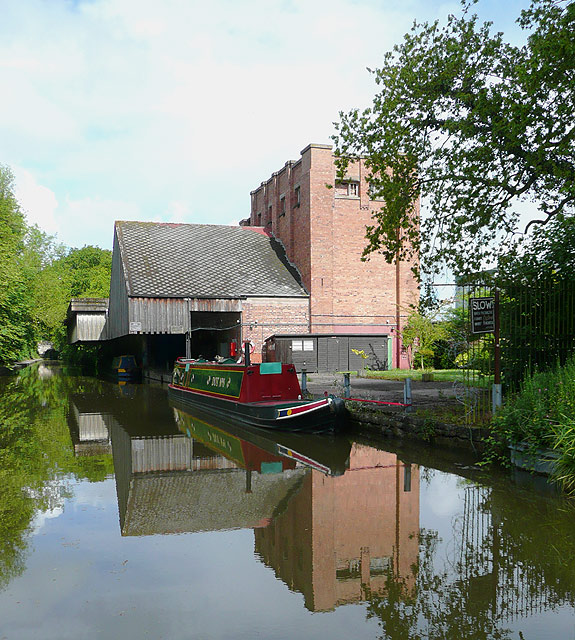
Cadbury Wharf, Knighton, Staffordshire. It was operated by Cadbury between 1911 and 1961, to process locally collected milk and produce "chocolate crumb" which was transported to Cadbury's in Bournville.

In 1919, Cadbury merged with Fry's, resulting in the integration of well-known brands such as Fry's Chocolate Cream and Fry's Turkish Delight. In 1921, the many small Fry's factories around Bristol were closed down, and production was consolidated at a new Somerdale Factory, outside Bristol.

Cadbury expanded its product range with Flake (1920), Creme eggs (1923), Fruit and Nut (1928), and Crunchie (1929, originally under the Fry's label). By 1930, Cadbury was the 24th-largest British manufacturing company as measured by estimated market value of capital. Cadbury took direct control of the under-performing Fry in 1935. Dairy Milk Whole Nut arrived in 1933, and tins of Roses were introduced in 1938 (competing with Quality Street launched by Mackintosh's in 1936). Roses has become a very popular Christmas (and Mother's Day) gift.

By the mid-1930s, Cadbury estimated that 90 percent of the British population could readily afford to buy chocolate as it was no longer considered a luxury item for the working classes. By 1936, Dairy Milk accounted for 60 per cent of the UK milk chocolate market. Between the two world wars Cadbury sent test packages to British schoolchildren in exchange for their opinions on new products, one of whom, Roald Dahl, would later write the children's novel Charlie and the Chocolate Factory.

During the Second World War, parts of the Bournville factory were turned over to war work, producing milling machines and seats for fighter aircraft. Workers ploughed football fields to plant crops. As chocolate was regarded as an essential food, it was placed under government supervision for the entire war. The wartime rationing of chocolate ended in 1950, and normal production resumed. Cadbury subsequently invested in new factories and had an increasing demand for their products. In 1952 the Moreton factory was built.

In 1967, Cadbury acquired an Australian confectioner, MacRobertson's, beating a rival bid from Mars. As a result of the takeover, Cadbury built a 60 per cent market share in the Australian market.

Cadbury was a holder of a royal warrant issued by Queen Elizabeth II from 1955 to 2022. A warrant from King Charles III was held for a further two years, but was dropped in 2024.

=== Schweppes merger (1969) ===
Cadbury merged with drinks company Schweppes to form Cadbury Schweppes in 1969. Head of Schweppes, Harold Watkinson, became chairman, and Sir Adrian Cadbury became deputy chairman and managing director. The benefits of the merger were to prove elusive. The merger put an end to Cadbury's close links to its Quaker founding family.

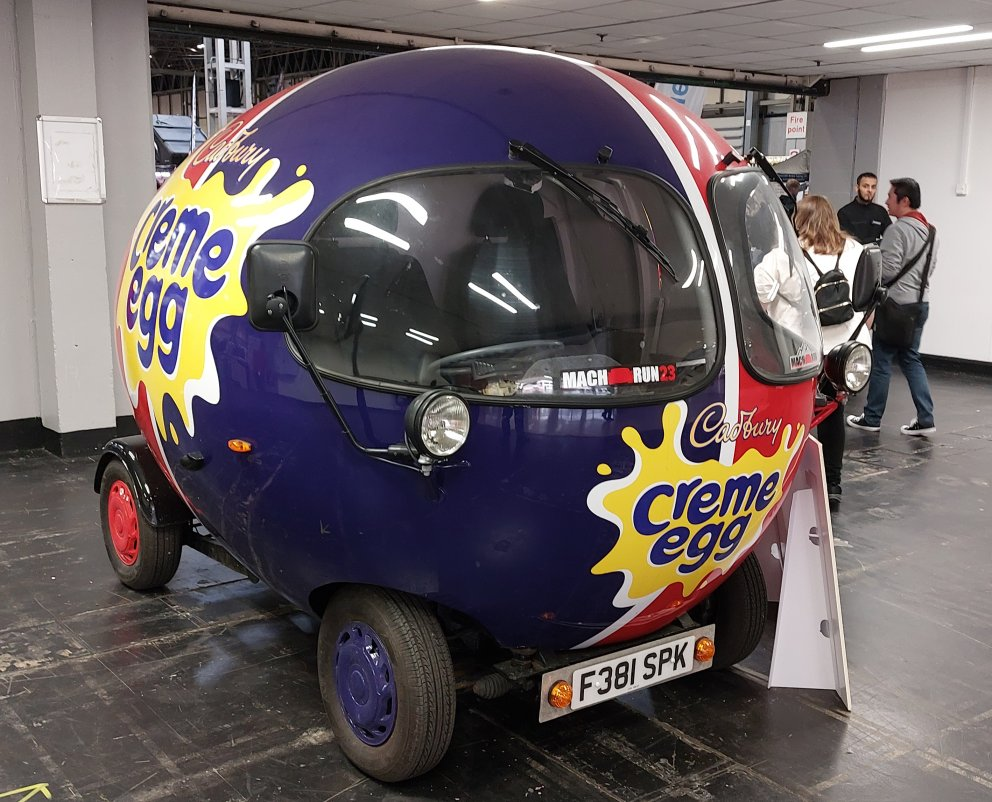
A Cadbury Creme Egg branded promotional vehicle, which first appeared on roads in 1988, on display at the National Exhibition Centre in Birmingham

In 1978, the company acquired Peter Paul, the third largest chocolate manufacturer in the US for $58 million, which gave it a 10 per cent share of the world's largest confectionery market. The successful Wispa chocolate bar was launched in the North East of England in 1981, and nationwide in 1984, quickly followed by Boost and Twirl chocolate bars. In 1982, trading profits were greater outside of Britain than in the UK for the first time.

In 1986, Cadbury Schweppes sold its Beverages and Foods division to a management buyout known as Premier Brands for £97 million. This saw the company divest itself of such brands as Typhoo Tea, Kenco, Smash and Hartley Chivers jam. It also saw Premier take the licence for production of Cadbury brand biscuits and drinking chocolate.

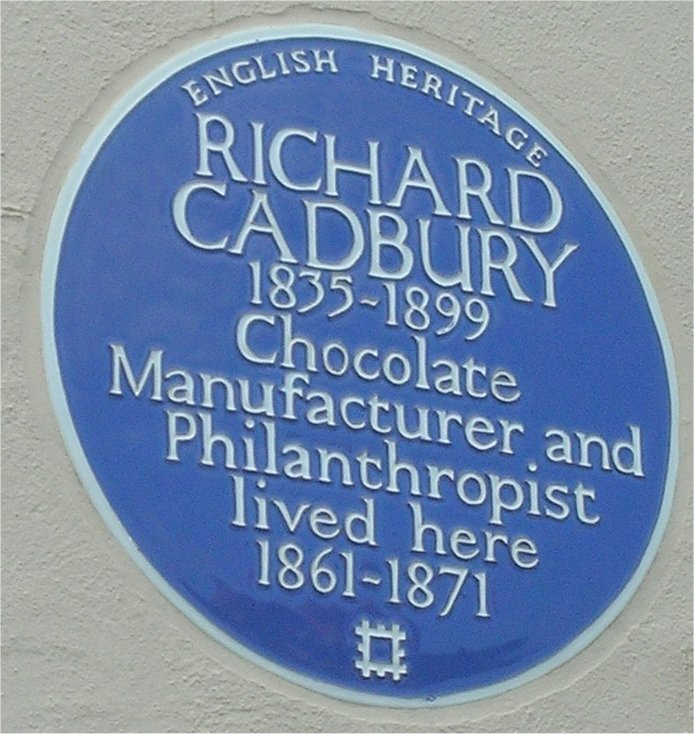
An English Heritage blue plaque commemorating one of the founder's sons Richard Cadbury was installed in Edgbaston, Birmingham in 2002.

Meanwhile, Schweppes switched its alliance in the UK from Pepsi to Coca-Cola, taking a 51 per cent stake in the joint venture Coca-Cola Schweppes. The acquisition of Canada Dry doubled its worldwide drinks market share, and it took a 30 per cent stake in Dr Pepper. As a result of these acquisitions, Cadbury Schweppes became the third largest soft drinks manufacturer in the world. In August 1988, the company sold its U.S. confectionery operations to Hershey's for $284.5 million cash plus the assumption of $30 million in debt, while it purchased the French business Choclat Poulain in the same year.

In 1992, company chairman Sir Adrian Cadbury produced the Cadbury Report (via the Cadbury committee set up by the London Stock Exchange), a code of best practice which served as a basis for reform of corporate governance around the world. In 1993, Cadbury Schweppes acquired A&W. In 1995, Cadbury Schweppes acquired Dr Pepper/Seven-Up Companies. In 1999, Cadbury Schweppes sold its worldwide beverage businesses to The Coca-Cola Company except in North America and continental Europe for $700 million. In the same year, the company purchased E. Wedel and their factory in Praga, from PepsiCo for US$76.5 million.

Snapple, Mistic and Stewart's (formerly Cable Car Beverage) were sold by Triarc to Cadbury Schweppes in 2000 for $1.45 billion. In October of that same year, Cadbury Schweppes purchased Royal Crown from Triarc. In 2003, Cadbury Schweppes acquired Adams, the US chewing gum operations of Pfizer Inc., for $4.2 billion, making Cadbury the world's biggest confectionery company. In 2005, Cadbury Schweppes acquired Green & Black's for £20 million.

==== Schweppes demerger ====
In March 2007, it was revealed that Cadbury Schweppes was planning to split its business into two separate entities: one focusing on its main chocolate and confectionery market; the other on its US drinks business. The demerger took effect on 2 May 2008, with the drinks business becoming Dr Pepper Snapple Group and Cadbury Schweppes plc becoming Cadbury plc. In December 2008 it was announced that Cadbury was to sell its Australian beverage unit to Asahi Breweries.

=== 2007–2010 ===
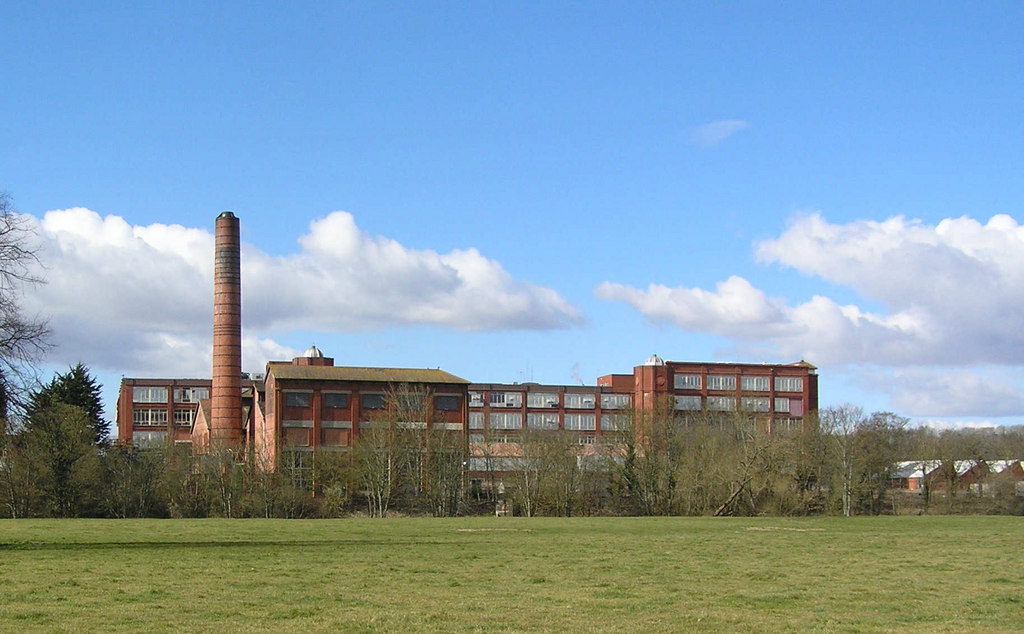
Cadbury's Somerdale Factory located in Keynsham near Bristol, south west England, operated from 1921 to 2010

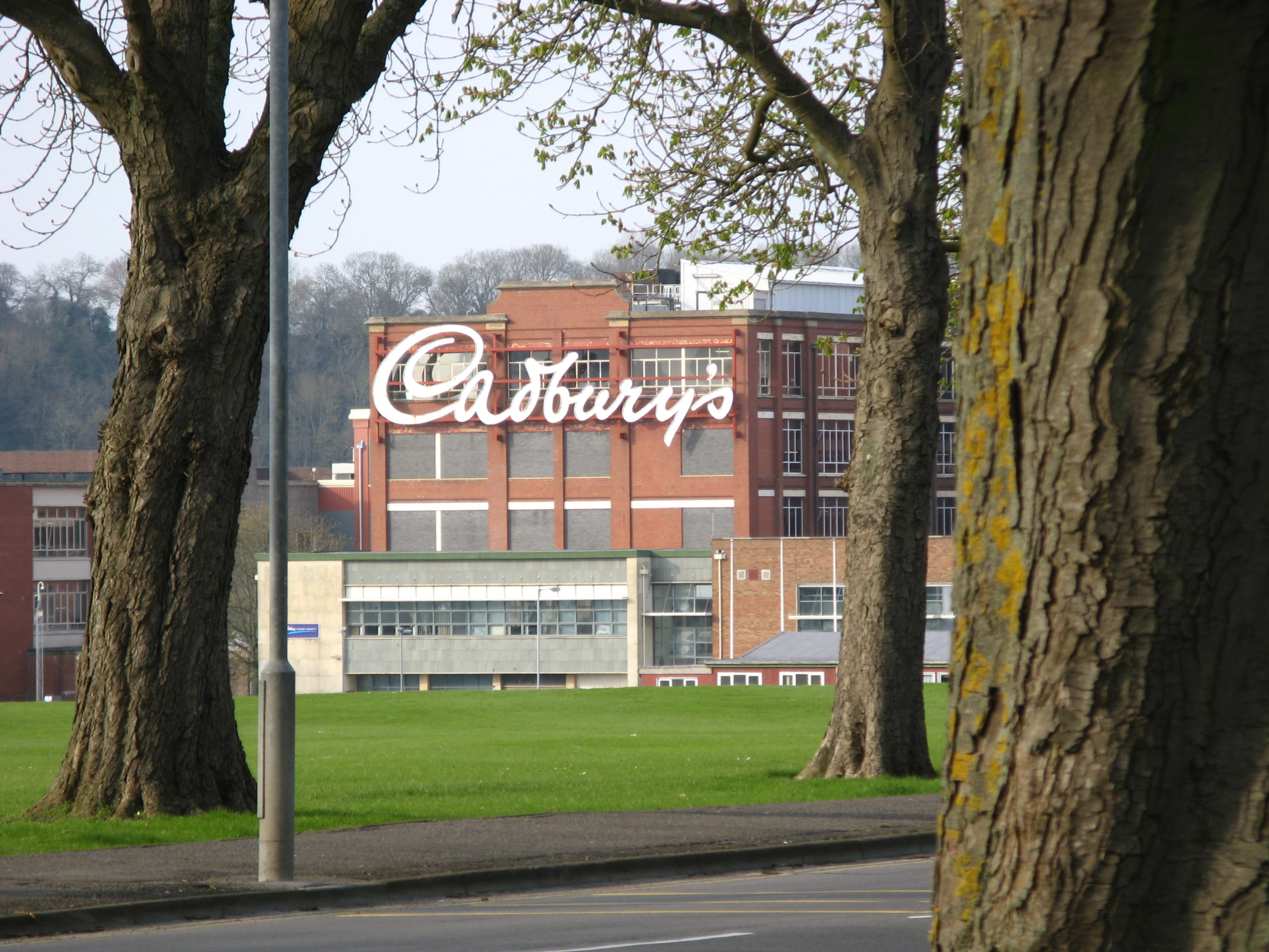
Cadbury's sign at Somerdale.

In October 2007, Cadbury announced the closure of the Somerdale Factory, in Keynsham, Somerset, formerly part of Fry's. Between 500 and 700 jobs were affected by this change. Production transferred to other plants in England and Poland.

In 2008, Monkhill Confectionery, the Own Label trading division of Cadbury Trebor Bassett was sold to Tangerine Confectionery for £58 million. This sale included factories at Pontefract, Cleckheaton and York and a distribution centre near Chesterfield, and the transfer of around 800 employees.

In mid-2009, Cadbury replaced some of the cocoa butter in their non-UK chocolate products with palm oil. Despite stating this was a response to consumer demand to improve taste and texture, there was no "new improved recipe" claim placed on New Zealand labels. Consumer backlash was significant from environmentalists and chocolate lovers in both Australia and New Zealand, with consumers objecting to both the taste from the cheaper formulation, and the use of palm oil given its role in the destruction of rainforests. By August 2009, the company announced that it was reverting to the use of cocoa butter in New Zealand and Australia, although palm oil is still listed as an ingredient in Cadbury's flavoured sugar syrup based fillings (where it referred to as 'vegetable oil'). In addition, Cadbury stated it would source cocoa beans through Fair Trade channels. In January 2010 prospective buyer Kraft pledged to honour Cadbury's commitment.

=== Acquisition and subsidiary (2009–2023) ===
On 7 September 2009, Kraft Foods made a £10.2 billion (US$16.2 billion) hostile takeover bid for Cadbury. The offer was rejected, with Cadbury stating that it undervalued the company. Kraft launched a formal, hostile bid for Cadbury, valuing the firm at £9.8 billion on 9 November 2009. The UK Business Secretary Peter Mandelson warned Kraft not to try to "make a quick buck" from the acquisition of Cadbury.

On 19 January 2010, it was announced that Cadbury and Kraft Foods had reached a deal and that Kraft would purchase Cadbury for £8.40 per share, valuing Cadbury at £11.5bn (US$18.9bn). Kraft, which issued a statement stating that the deal will create a "global confectionery leader", had to borrow £7 billion (US$11.5bn) in order to finance the takeover.

The Hershey Company, based in Pennsylvania, manufactures and distributes Cadbury-branded chocolate (but not its other confectionery) in the United States and has been reported to share Cadbury's "ethos". Hershey had expressed an interest in buying Cadbury because it would broaden its access to faster-growing international markets. But on 22 January 2010, Hershey announced that it would not counter Kraft's final offer.

The acquisition of Cadbury faced widespread disapproval from the British public, as well as groups and organisations including trade union Unite, who fought against the acquisition of the company which, according to Prime Minister Gordon Brown, was very important to the British economy. Unite estimated that a takeover by Kraft could put 30,000 jobs "at risk", and UK shareholders protested over the mergers and acquisitions advisory fees charged by banks. Cadbury's M&A advisers were UBS, Goldman Sachs and Morgan Stanley. Controversially, RBS, a bank 84% owned by the United Kingdom Government, funded the Kraft takeover.

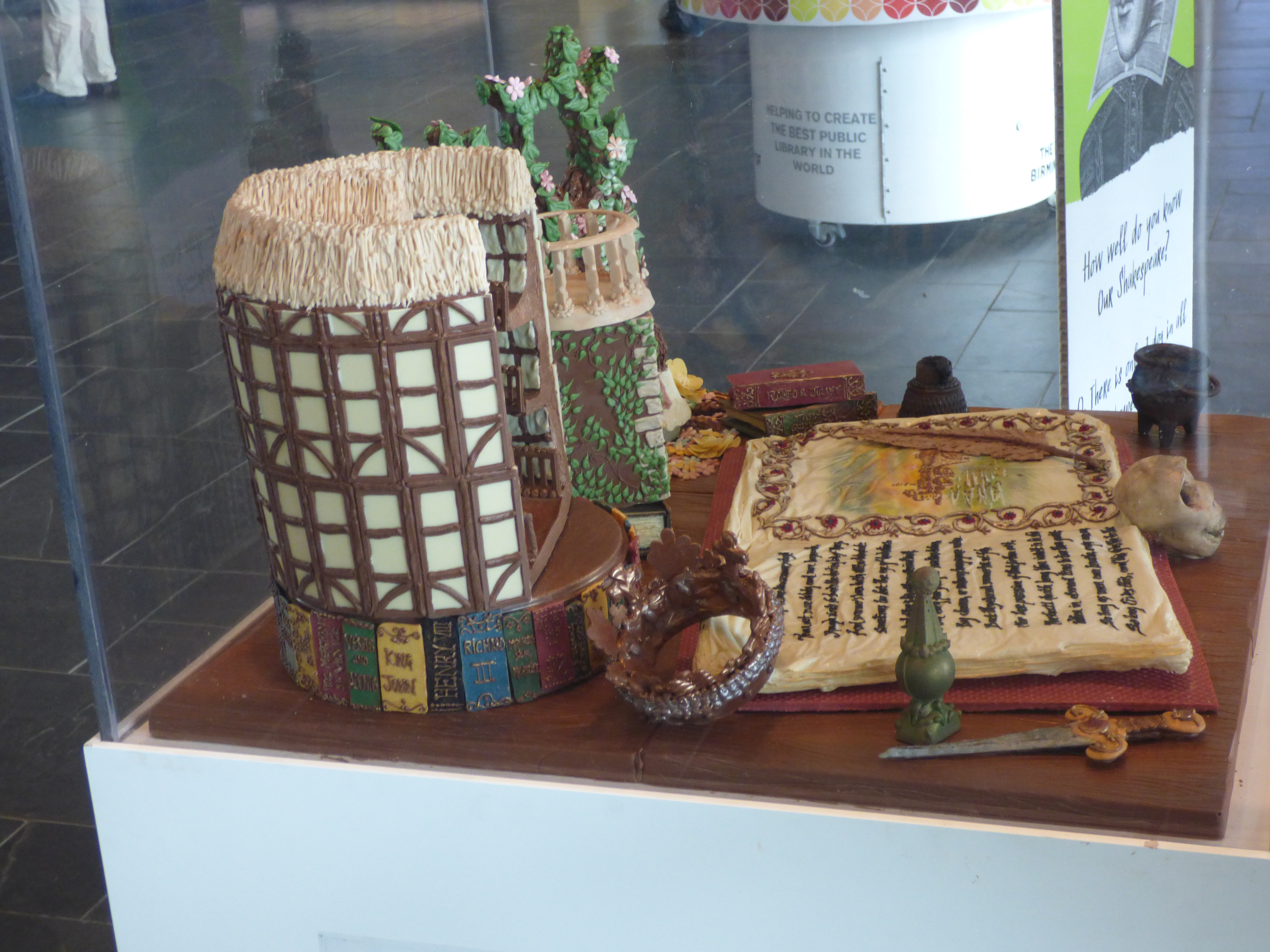
Cadbury World exhibition at the Library of Birmingham, July 2016. A tribute to Shakespeare (born 22 miles (35 km) south east of the city), the miniature Shakespeare's Globe theatre (left) and a manuscript are made from Cadbury chocolate.

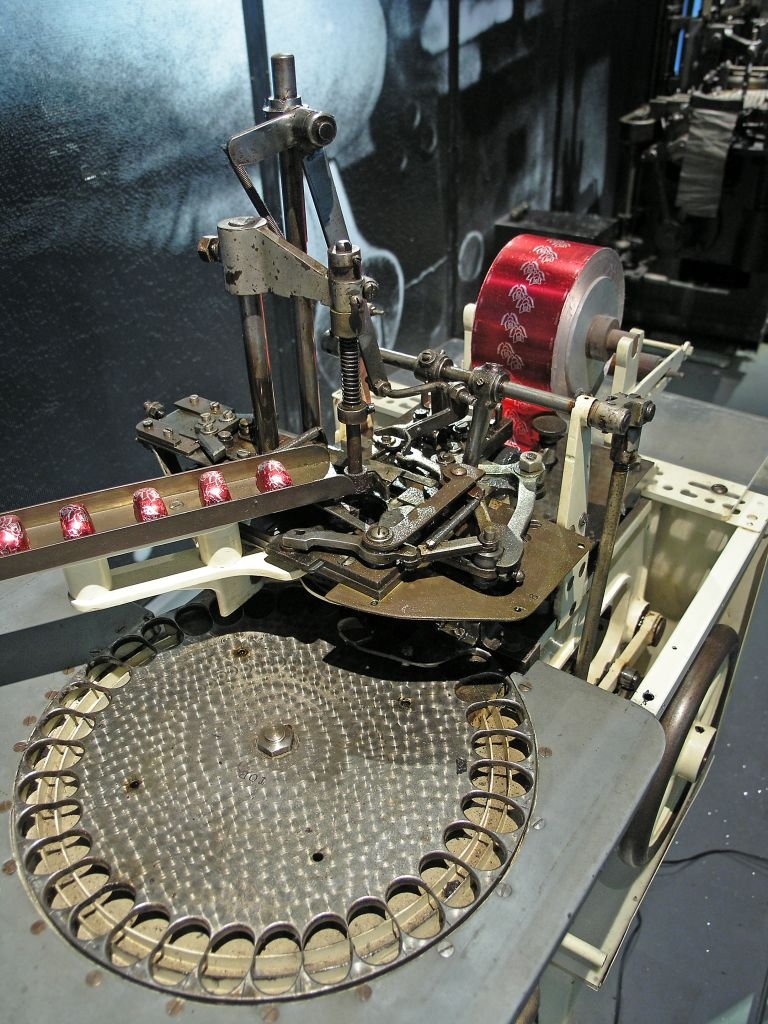
An early Cadbury chocolate wrapping machine on display at Thinktank, Birmingham Science Museum

On 2 February 2010, Kraft secured over 71% of Cadbury's shares thus finalising the deal. Kraft had needed to reach 75% of the shares in order to be able to delist Cadbury from the stock market and fully integrate it as part of Kraft. This was achieved on 5 February, and the company announced that Cadbury shares would be de-listed on 8 March. On 3 February, the Chairman Roger Carr, chief executive Todd Stitzer and chief financial officer Andrew Bonfield all announced their resignations. Stitzer had worked at the company for 27 years. On 9 February, Kraft announced that it was planning to close the Somerdale Factory, Keynsham, with the loss of 400 jobs. The management explained that existing plans to move production to Poland were too advanced to be realistically reversed, though assurances had been given regarding sustaining the plant. Staff at Keynsham criticised this move, suggesting that they felt betrayed and as if they have been "sacked twice". On 22 April 2010, Phil Rumbol, the man behind the famous Cadbury Gorilla advertisement, announced his plans to leave the Cadbury company in July following Kraft's takeover.

The European Commission decided that Kraft would have to divest Cadbury's confectionery businesses in Poland (Wedel) and Romania (Kandia). In June 2010, the Polish division, Cadbury-Wedel, was sold to Lotte of Korea. As part of the deal Kraft kept the Cadbury, Hall's and other brands along with two plants in Skarbimierz-Osiedle. Lotte took over the plant in Warsaw along with the E Wedel brand. Kandia was sold back to the Meinl family, which had owned the brand from 2003 to 2007.

On 4 August 2011, Kraft Foods announced it would be splitting into two companies beginning on 1 October 2012. The snack and confectionery business of Kraft became Mondelez International, of which Cadbury would become a subsidiary.

In response to diminishing margins in early 2014, Mondelez hired Accenture to implement a US$3 billion cost-cutting programme of the company's assets including Cadbury and Oreo. Beginning in 2015, Mondelez began closing Cadbury factories in several developed countries including Ireland, Canada, the United States, and New Zealand and shifting production to "advantaged" country locations like China, India, Brazil, and Mexico. The closure of Cadbury factories in centres such as Dublin, Montreal, Chicago, Philadelphia, and Dunedin in New Zealand generated outcries from the local populations. The plan received approval from several market shareholders including the Australian and New Zealand banks Westpac and ASB Bank.

In January 2017, Cadbury became the official snack partner of the Premier League, and sponsored the Premier League Golden Boot and Premier League Golden Glove awards.

==== 200th anniversary: 2024–present ====
On 8 January 2024, Mondelez International announced plans to celebrate the 200th anniversary of Cadbury, including: promotions, celebrations, and seven retro packaging designs for its Cadbury Dairy Milk bars.

On 17 March 2024, Cadbury celebrated their bicentenary by unveiling their newly refurbished UK archive. The new archive which cost £350,000, documents over 50,000 Cadbury items including; packaging history, artworks, and discontinued products. With Mondelēz International planning on opening the archive to the public at a later date.

On 23 December 2024, it was announced that after 170 years of its association with the British monarchy, since the reign of Queen Victoria, Cadbury would now no longer hold its Royal Warrant under King Charles III. While no reason was given, the King had been urged by campaign group B4Ukraine to withdraw warrants from companies "still operating in Russia" after the invasion of Ukraine, with Mondelez and consumer goods firm Unilever (who also lost its royal warrant) among those named. In a statement by a Mondelez spokesperson: "Whilst we are disappointed to be one of hundreds of other businesses and brands in the UK [...] to not have a new warrant awarded, we are proud to have previously held one, and we fully respect the decision."

== Operations ==
=== Head office ===
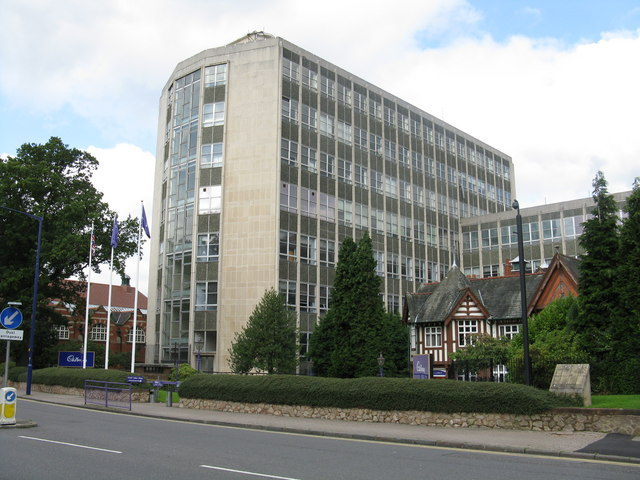
Cadbury's office block in Bournville

Cadbury has its head office at Cadbury House in the Uxbridge Business Park in Denham, Buckinghamshire near Uxbridge, Greater London, England. The company occupies 84,000 square feet (7,800 m^{2}) of leased space inside Building 3 of the business park, which it shares with Mondelez's UK division. After acquiring Cadbury, Kraft confirmed that the company would remain at Cadbury House.

Cadbury relocated to Uxbridge Business Park from its previous head office at 25 Berkeley Square in Mayfair, City of Westminster in 2007 as a cost-saving measure. In 1992, the company leased the space for £55 per square foot (0.093 m^{2}); by 2002 this had reached £68.75 per square foot.

=== Production sites ===
==== Bournville ====
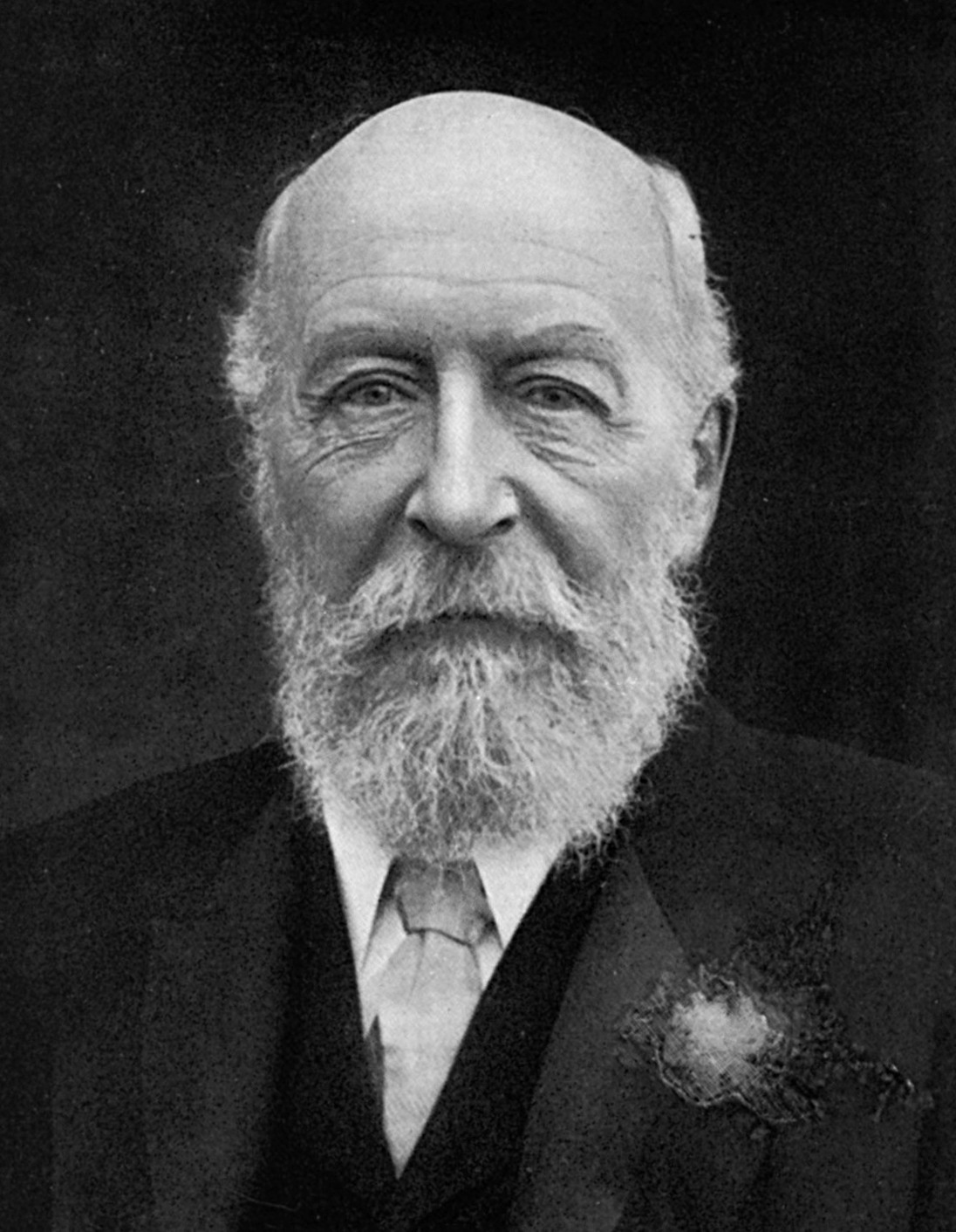
The founder's son George Cadbury established Bournville.

Located four miles (6.4 km) south of Birmingham in England, the Cadbury plant in Bournville was opened in 1879 by company founder John Cadbury's son George, whose aim was that one-tenth of the Bournville estate should be "laid out and used as parks, recreation grounds and open space." It subsequently became known as "the factory in a garden". Cadbury's dark chocolate bar, Bournville, is named after the model village, and was first sold in 1908.

Bournville employs almost 1,000 people. In 2014, Mondelez announced a £75 million investment in the site, with Cadbury stating it "reinforces Bournville's position at the heart of the British chocolate industry".

Bournville is home to Mondelez International’s Global Centre of Excellence for chocolate research and development, where new chocolate products are researched and developed.

== Markets ==
=== United Kingdom ===
The confectionery business in the UK is called Cadbury (formerly Cadbury Trebor Bassett) and, as of August 2004, had eight factories and 3,000 staff in the UK. Mondelez also sells biscuits bearing the Cadbury brand, such as Cadbury Fingers. Mondelez also owns Fry's and Maynards Bassetts (created by merging Bassett's with Maynards).

Cadbury Mini Rolls (left in the two middle rows, next to Mr Kipling cakes and below McVitie's biscuits) on sale in Tesco supermarket in the UK.

Ice cream based on Cadbury products, like 99 Flake, is made under licence by Frederick's Dairies. Cadbury cakes and chocolate spread are manufactured under licence by Premier Foods, but the cakes were originally part of Cadbury Foods Ltd with factories at Blackpole in Worcester and Moreton on the Wirral, with distribution depots throughout the UK.

Other Kraft subsidiaries in the UK include Cadbury Two LLP, Cadbury UK Holdings Limited, Cadbury US Holdings Limited, Cadbury Four LLP, Cadbury Holdings Limited, and Cadbury One LLP.

According to the environmental charity Keep Britain Tidy, Cadbury chocolate wrappers along with Walkers crisps packets and Coca-Cola cans were the three top brands that were the most common pieces of rubbish found in UK streets in 2013. In 2014, Cadbury Dairy Milk was the best-selling chocolate bar in the UK. A 2018 YouGov poll saw Cadbury's Chocolate Digestives ranked the second most popular biscuit in the UK after McVitie's Chocolate Digestives.

=== Ireland ===
Cadbury Ireland Limited is based in Coolock in Dublin, where the headquarters of Cadbury Ireland are located, and in Rathmore, County Kerry. Products made by Cadbury in Ireland include both the Dairy Milk and Snacks ranges, Twirl, Flake and Boost (formerly Moro). Cadbury previously used their Irish factories to produce the Time Out bar for the European market, however this production was moved to Poland.

=== United States ===
Cadbury Adams USA
- Type: Subsidiary
- Industry: Chocolate
- Founded: December 2002; 23 years ago
- Headquarters: Parsippany-Troy Hills, New Jersey, U.S.
- Products: Chocolate
- Owners: Mondelez International
- Website: cadburyusa.com

Cadbury Adams USA produces candy, gum, breath mints and cough drops. It is headquartered in Parsippany, New Jersey. The company was formed after the then Cadbury Schweppes purchased the Adams brand from Pfizer in December 2002 for US$4.2 billion.

American Chicle was purchased by Warner–Lambert in 1962; Warner-Lambert renamed the unit Adams in 1997 and merged with Pfizer in 2000.

==== Previous Operations ====
In 1978, Cadbury USA merged with Peter Paul, makers of Mounds and Almond Joy. In 1988, Cadbury US was sold to The Hershey Company for $300 million. As part of the deal, Hershey acquired the U.S. rights to manufacture Cadbury products, causing complaints by consumers, who claim the Hershey-made products are inferior to the originals. Before the May 2008 demerger, the North American business also contained beverage unit Cadbury Schweppes Americas Beverages. In 1982, Cadbury Schweppes purchased the Duffy-Mott Company.

==== Cadbury products in the US ====
Maynards

- Wine Gums (original and Sour)
- Swedish Fish
- Swedish Berries
- Juicy Squirts (Sours, Citrus, and Berry)
- Original Gummies
- Fuzzy Peach
- Sour Chillers
- Sour Patch Kids
- Mini Fruit Gums
- Sour Cherry Blasters
- Fruit Mania
- Bassett's Liquorice Allsorts

Chocolate-related (Made by Hershey)

- Creme egg
- Caramello
- Royal Dark
- Dairy Milk

Gum

- Bubbaloo bubble gum
- Bubblicious bubble gum
- Chiclets
- Clorets
- Dentyne
- Stride
- Trident

Other

- Halls (cough drop)

Discontinued products

- Beemans chewing gum
- Black Jack chewing gum
- Certs breath mints
- Cinn*a*Burst gum
- Clove gum
- Freshen Up
- Fruit*a*Burst gum
- Mint*a*Burst gum
- Sparkies
- Sour Cherry Gum
- Sour Apple Gum

=== Australia ===
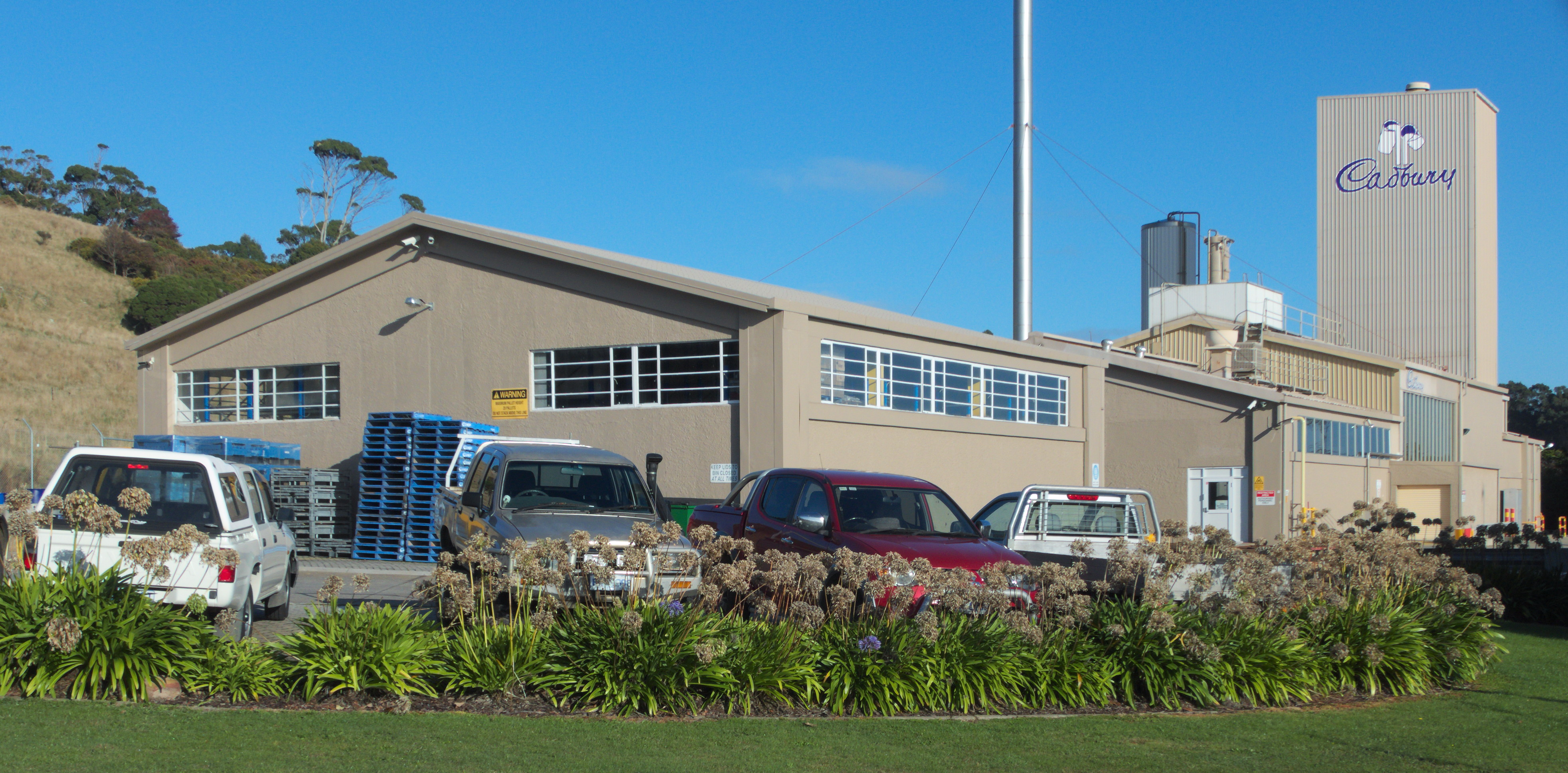
Milk processing plant at Cooee, Burnie, Tasmania.

Cadbury's products were first imported into Australia as early as 1853, when three cases of Cadbury's cocoa and chocolate were advertised for sale in Adelaide. Cadbury's first overseas order in 1881 was made for the Australian market. In 1919, as part of its plans to expand internationally, the company decided to build a factory in Australia. Tasmania was chosen as the location of Cadbury's first factory outside of the United Kingdom, due to its close proximity to the city of Hobart, good source of inexpensive hydro-electricity and plentiful supply of high-quality fresh milk. Cadbury's Claremont was modelled on Bournville, with its own village and sporting facilities. The first products from Claremont were sold in 1922. Cadbury's Claremont was once a popular tourist attraction and operated daily tours; however, the factory ceased running full tours mid-2008, citing health and safety reasons. Cadbury has been upgrading its manufacturing facility at Claremont, Tasmania, Australia, since 2001. Cadbury's Claremont is the largest chocolate factory in the Southern Hemisphere, producing a company-record of over 58,000 tonnes (57,000 long tons; 64,000 short tons) of chocolate in 2021. Cadbury also operates a milk-processing plant in Cooee, Tasmania and two other factories in Melbourne, Victoria (Ringwood and Scoresby).

On 27 February 2009, the confectionery and beverages businesses of Cadbury Schweppes in Australia were formally separated and the beverages business began operating as Schweppes Australia Pty Ltd. In April 2009, Schweppes Australia was acquired by Asahi Breweries.

In 2015, the Australian Cadbury factory, located in Hobart, reduced its work force by 80 and in 2017 closed its visitor's centre. In August 2017, Cadbury announced that 50 workers will be shed from its Hobart factory. Within Australia there is debate regarding halal certification. Many of Cadbury's products are halal certified. This certification has generated controversy, especially from One Nation politician Pauline Hanson.

=== New Zealand ===
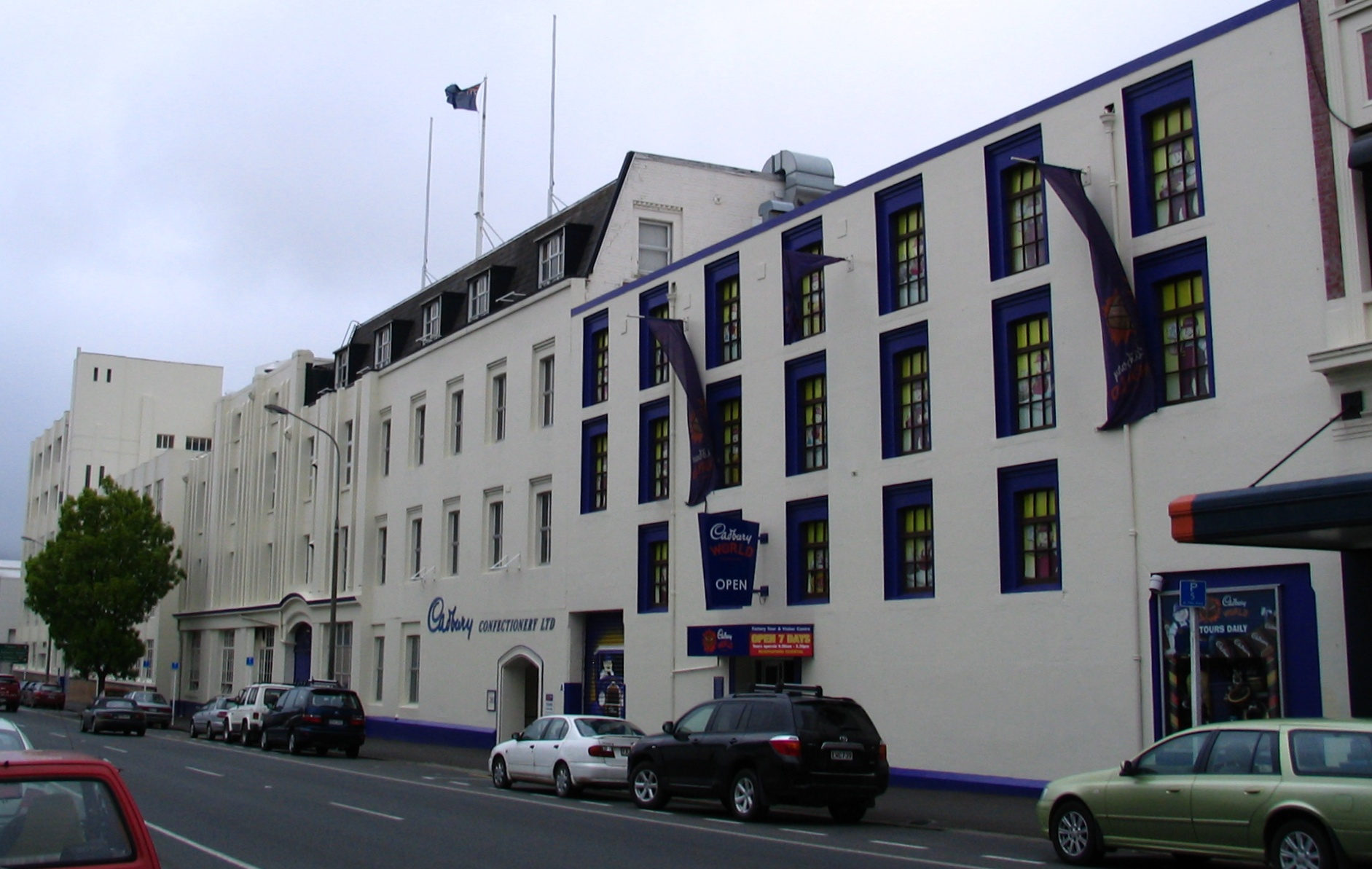
Former factory in Dunedin.

Cadbury had also operated a factory in Dunedin in New Zealand's South Island until its closure in March 2018. In 1930, Cadbury partnered with local confectionery businessman Richard Hudson, who owned a chocolate, confectionery, biscuit factory on Castle Street. Hudson's factory was rebranded as Cadbury Hudson and later became known as the Cadbury Confectionery. Cadbury later established a second factory in Auckland in the North Island. In 2003, Cadbury established a tourist attraction on the premises of the Dunedin factory known as Cadbury World, which featured a large chocolate waterfall. In 2007, Cadbury closed down its Auckland factory, leading to the loss of 200 jobs. In 2009, the Cadbury Dunedin factory attracted criticism from consumers and local environmentalists when it replaced cocoa butter with palm oil. In response, the company backtracked but still retained palm oil as a filling in some ingredients. Over the next several years, Cadbury began downsizing its products, including trimming chocolate blocks in 2015.

On 16 February 2017, it was reported that Cadbury would be closing its factory in Dunedin, New Zealand by March 2018. This is estimated to lead to the loss of 350 jobs. Amanda Banfield, Mondelez's vice-president for Australia, New Zealand, and Japan, clarified that the closure was done due to Mondelez's decision to shift chocolate manufacturing to Cadbury's Australian factories. However, Mondelez has also confirmed that Dunedin's Cadbury World tourist attraction would remain open due to its popularity with tourists.

Following four weeks of consultations with local Cadbury employees, the Mayor of Dunedin Dave Cull, and local trade union representatives, Banfield confirmed that the closure would go ahead the following year due to the lack of viable options to continue production in New Zealand. She also confirmed that Cadbury would offer a redundancy support package to staff and would also sponsor staff willing to move to Australia to work. Mondelez also confirmed that it was looking for a third-party manufacturer to continue making Cadbury's New Zealand brands Pineapple Lumps, Jaffas, Chocolate Fish and Buzz Bar. In early June 2017, local city councillor Jim O'Malley and a group of volunteers launched a crowdfunding campaign to keep the Dunedin factory running on a portion of the site. They formed a group called Dunedin Manufacturing Holdings (DMH). Despite generating NZ$6 million in funds, DMH abandoned its bid on 22 June due to Mondelez's stringent production and supply requirements and difficulties in acquiring manpower and machinery. Mondelez has also indicated that it is negotiating with two local chocolate companies to ensure the production of iconic local brands such as Pineapple Lumps, Jaffas, Chocolate Fish, Buzz Bars, and Pinky Bars in New Zealand.

On 17 October 2017, Cadbury announced that it would be shifting all production of its New Zealand brands to Australia after failing to find a local supplier. The termination of New Zealand production took effect in March 2018. Mondelez's New Zealand country head James Kane confirmed the shift on the grounds that the production of Cadbury products would require certain technologies, production processes and skills that local New Zealand manufacturers lacked.

On 4 May, it was reported that the Dunedin Cadbury World would be closing down after the Ministry of Health purchased the entire former Cadbury factory site to make way for a new public hospital. Mondelez area vice-president Banfield confirmed that Cadbury had sold the former factory site to the Ministry of Health for an undisclosed amount.

=== Canada ===
Cadbury's Canadian head office is located in Toronto. Cadbury Canada produce and import several products that are sold under the Cadbury and Maynards labels, including the following:

- Cadbury
  - Cadbury Coconut
  - Caramilk
  - Creme Egg
  - Crispy Crunch
  - Crunchie
  - Dairy Milk (various flavours)
  - Flake
  - Mini Eggs (also appear in a Tim Hortons doughnut)
  - Mr. Big
  - Pep
  - Wunderbar (aka Starbar)
- Maynards
  - Wine Gums
  - Sour Wine Gums
  - Swedish Berries
  - Swedish Fish
  - Sour Patch Kids
  - Juicy Squirts

Cadbury Canada is now part of Mondelez Canada and products are featured on the Snackworks website.

=== India ===
Cadbury India
- Type: Subsidiary
- Industry: Chocolate
- Founded: 19 July 1948; 78 years ago
- Headquarters: Mumbai, India
- Key people: Anand Kripalu (managing director)
- Products: Chocolate confectionery
- Brands: List: Cadbury Dairy Milk; 5-star; Perk; Gems; Eclairs; Oreo; Bournvita
- Owner: Mondelez International
- Number of employees: 2,000

In 1948, Cadbury India began its operations in India by importing chocolates. On 19 July 1948, Cadbury was incorporated in India. It now has manufacturing facilities in Thane, Induri (Pune) and Malanpur (Bhind), Hyderabad, Bangalore and Baddi (Himachal Pradesh) and sales offices in New Delhi, Mumbai, Kolkata and Chennai. The corporate head office is in Mumbai. The head office is presently situated at Pedder Road, Mumbai, under the name of "Cadbury House". Since 1965 Cadbury has also pioneered the development of cocoa cultivation in India. For over two decades, Cadbury has worked with the Kerala Agricultural University to undertake cocoa research.

Currently, Cadbury India operates in five categories – Chocolate confectionery, Beverages, Biscuits, Gum and Candy. Its products include Cadbury Dairy Milk, Dairy Milk Silk, Bournville, Temptations, Perk, Eclairs, Bournvita, Celebrations, Gems, Bubbaloo, Cadbury Dairy Milk Shots, Halls, Bilkul, Tang, and Oreo.

It is the Indian market leader in the chocolate confectionery business with a market share of over 70%. On 21 April 2014, Cadbury India changed its name to Mondelez India Foods Limited. In 2017, Cadbury/Mondelez agreed to pay a $13 million FCPA penalty for making illicit payments to government officials to obtain licences and approvals to build a factory in Baddi.

==== Issues ====
In 2003, Businessworld in India reported there were 'Insects found in Cadbury's chocolates'. In 2021, Central Bureau of Investigation (CBI) carried out raids in Haryana and Himachal on Cadbury India Ltd premises. CBI filed FIR against Cadbury for corruption in connection with obtaining Himachal factory licence. CBI said Cadbury allegedly conspired with central excise officials between 2009 and 2011 and availed excise benefits to the tune of Rs 241 crore for its new unit in Himachal Pradesh.

=== Malta ===
In 2012, Alf Mizzi & Sons Marketing (Ltd) took over the importation and distribution of Cadbury, as well as several other Mondelez brands. Most of the Cadbury products are imported directly from the UK. The advertising of the brand was taken over by Sloane Ltd., which proved to be highly successful in creating market specific commercials, reaching more of the Maltese population than ever through digital advertising.

=== South Africa ===
Cadbury was introduced to South Africa in 1903 by the Cadbury brothers, Richard and George. The brothers appointed a sales agent to sell their products to the locals. The brand's popularity grew such that in 1926, the South African arm of Cadbury was formed and plans were made to construct a local chocolate manufacturing plant.

Cadbury broke ground with a chocolate plant in Port Elizabeth in 1930. By 1938, the first locally produced moulded Cadbury Dairy Milk chocolate slabs were produced. The first slabs of chocolate produced were the Milk, Nut Milk, Milk Fruit, Nut Brazil, Fruit & Nut and Bournville variety of Cadbury products.

In the 1950s, the Port Elizabeth factory was expanded to include a new laboratory in order to start producing new products, such as the Flake and Crunchie Bar (1960s). By the 1970s, the factory was expanded again to add a new Raw Materials Store and crumb silos. These have since become a local landmark. The same factory still produces some of the supply of Cadbury chocolate in South Africa.

In 2011, Kraft Foods, the company that then owned Cadbury, announced that it would be launching a fair-trade Dairy Milk chocolate bar on the South African market. The product had been available in other countries where Cadbury operated since 2009. The South African operation of Cadbury has a completely Africa-based supply chain, with cocoa beans bought in Ghana and the chocolate bars made in the factory at Port Elizabeth.

=== Nigeria ===
Cadbury's history in Nigeria dates back to the 1950s when it began sourcing for cocoa and also importing bulk products and repacking it into tins for sale in the country. Later finding increasing market opportunities in the country, the group set up a manufacturing facility in January 1965. The firm became a publicly quoted company in 1976 when Cadbury Schweppes sold 20% of its interest in the firm.

== Advertising ==
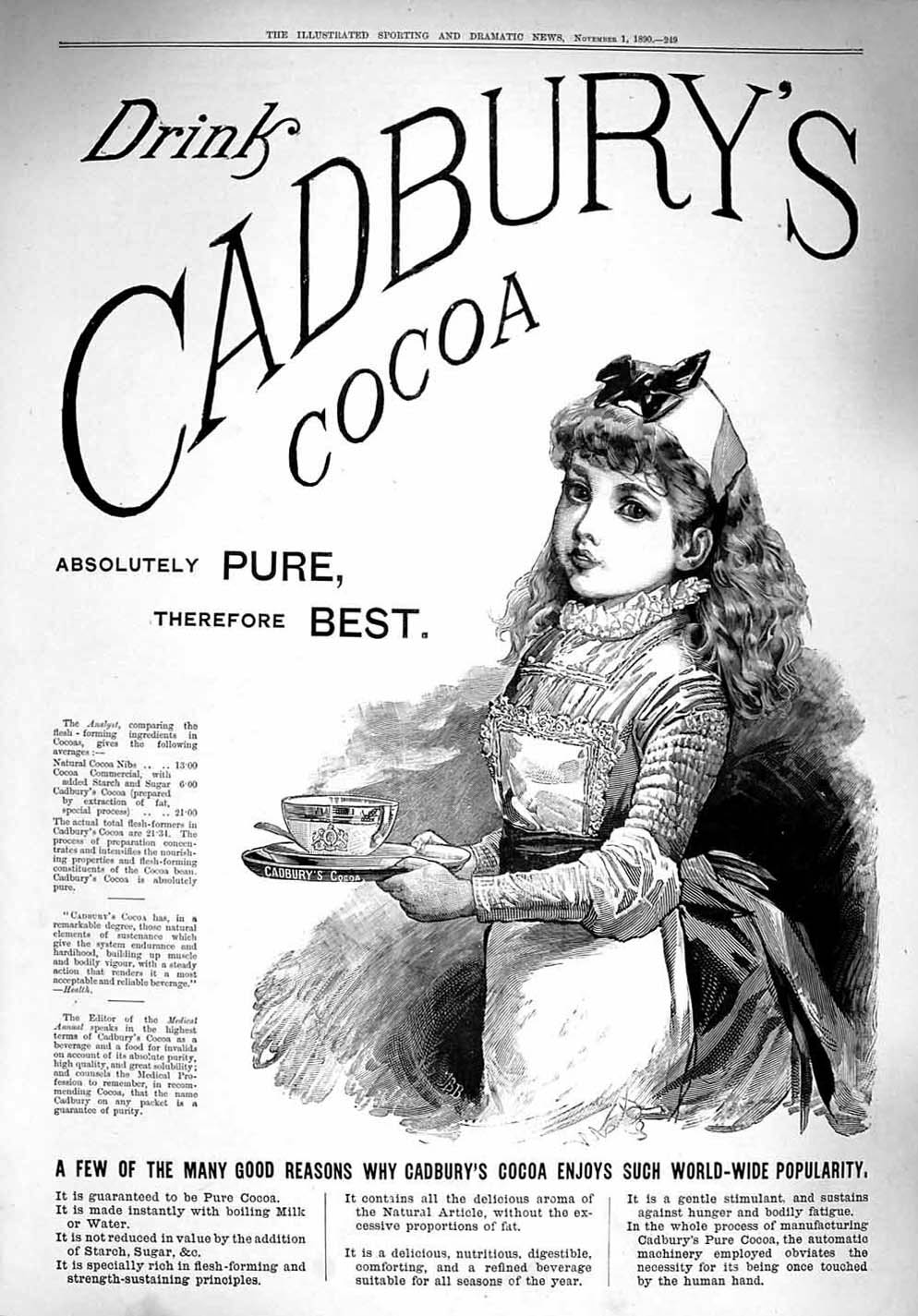
1890 advertisement in the British weekly Illustrated Sporting and Dramatic News

The Cadbury script logo is derived from the signature of William Cadbury, the founder's grandson, in 1921. It was adopted as the worldwide logo in the 1970s. Adopting purple as the company's colour in 1905 to honour Queen Victoria who had died in 1901, Cadbury famously trademarked purple for chocolates with registrations in 1995 and 2004. However, the validity of these trademarks is the matter of an ongoing legal dispute following objections by Nestlé.

In 1928, Cadbury's introduced the "glass and a half" slogan to accompany the Cadbury Dairy Milk bar, to advertise the bar's higher milk content. The Creme Egg slogan, "How do you eat yours?", inviting people to think about how they eat their eggs, was introduced in 1985. The brand has used immersive experiential marketing campaigns which include a Double Decker fun bus, Joy Generator machine and pop-up cafes.

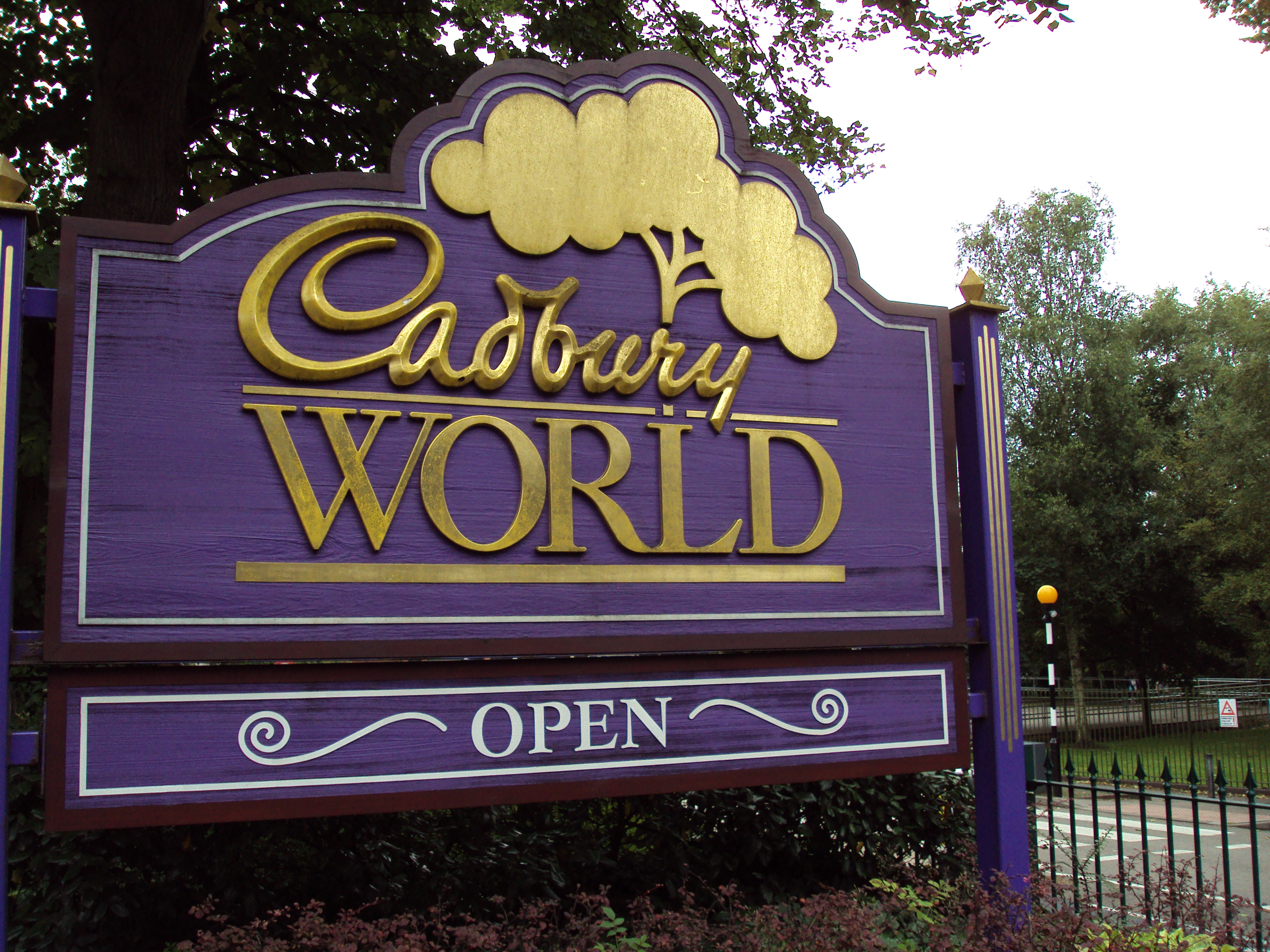
The signature logo as displayed at Cadbury World in Bournville, England. In 1905 the company chose purple as it was Queen Victoria's favourite colour

Cadbury has had famous names on their products, such as a Paddington Bear-branded chocolate bar in 1977, and Spice Girls-branded chocolate (chocolate bars, selection boxes, Easter Eggs) at the height of their 1990s success. A 60-second advertisement for Cadbury's Drinking Chocolate was the second advert ever to air on British television, following Gibbs SR Toothpaste in the first ITV advert break on 22 September 1955.

Four commercials for Cadbury products on British television featured in the top 50 of Channel 4's 2000 UK poll of the "100 Greatest Adverts". Cadbury Flake, featuring Flake Girl from 1959 onward, was ranked 26th, Cadbury Dairy Milk Fruit & Nut, featuring the slogan "Everyone's a fruit and nutcase" from 1977 onward, sung by comedian Frank Muir, ranked 36th, Fry's Turkish Delight, with the slogan "Full of Eastern Promise" from 1957 onward, which included model Jane Lumb, ranked 37th, and Cadbury Milk Tray (which since 1968 has been advertised by the 'Milk Tray Man', a mysterious James Bond–style figure who undertakes daunting 'raids' to secretively deliver a box of Milk Tray chocolates to a lady), the "Avalanche" advert where he races ahead of it to deliver the chocolates, ranked 48th. The 2007 Gorilla television commercial promoting Cadbury Dairy Milk – featuring Phil Collins "In the Air Tonight" – won numerous awards, including Gold at the British Television Advertising Awards in 2008.

Every year Cadbury also launches a Secret Santa campaign which features offline and online advertisements. The brand also tours the UK's major cities encouraging people to anonymously give their loved ones a free chocolate bar. Cadbury has specifically designed booths for the occasion but in 2020 due to the COVID-19 pandemic the campaign was done virtually.

== Products ==
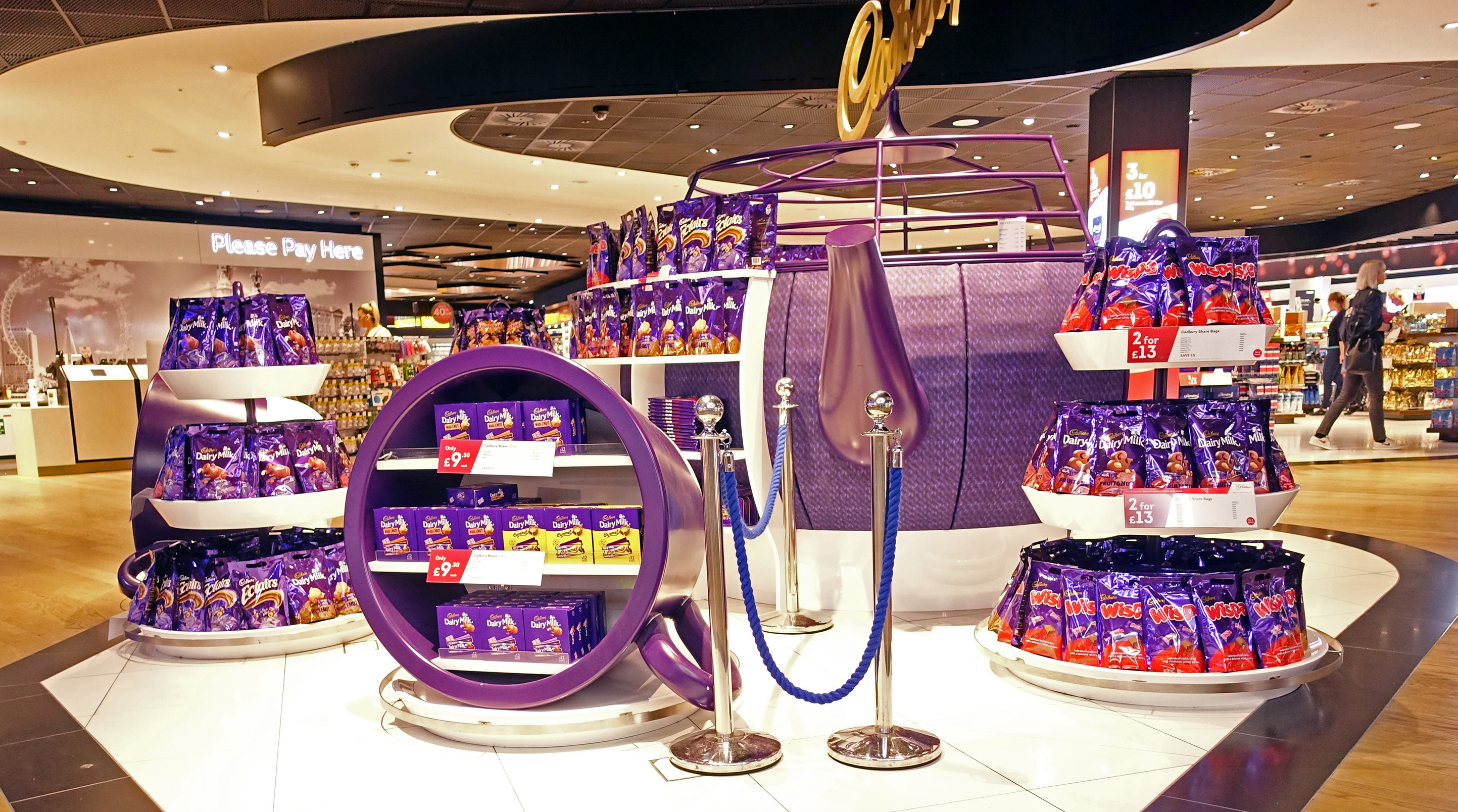
Cadbury chocolate stall at London's Heathrow Airport

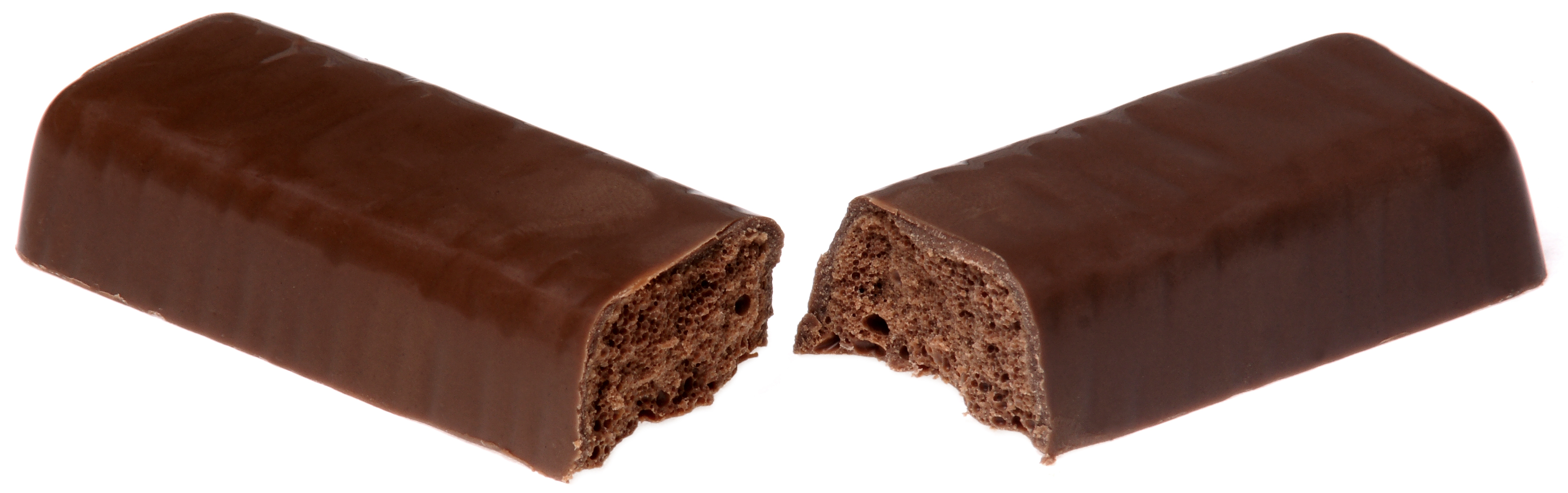
A Cadbury Wispa chocolate bar that is split in half. These are available in the UK after a successful 2007 online campaign to bring them back.

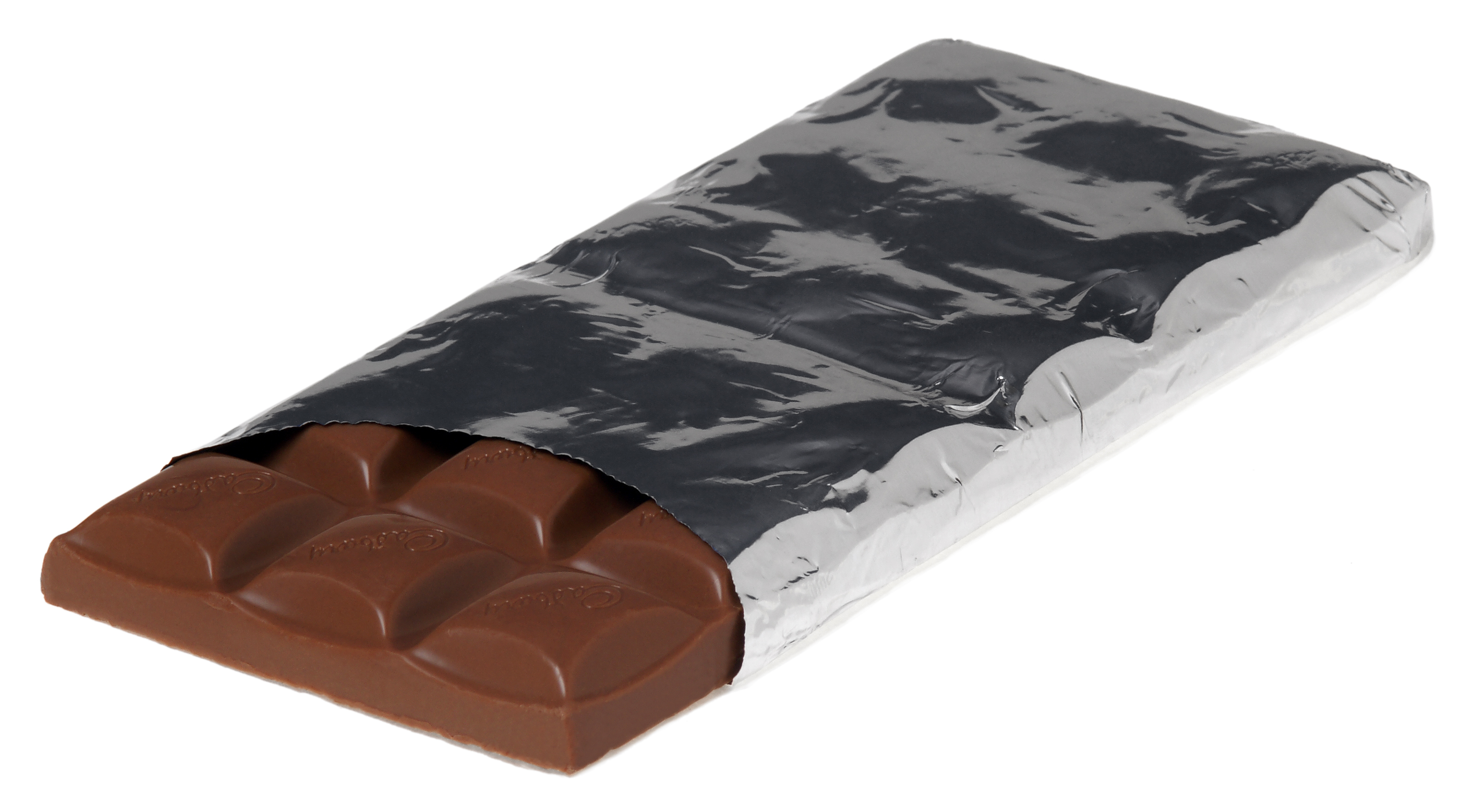
A Cadbury Dairy Milk Caramel bar in its foil wrapper.

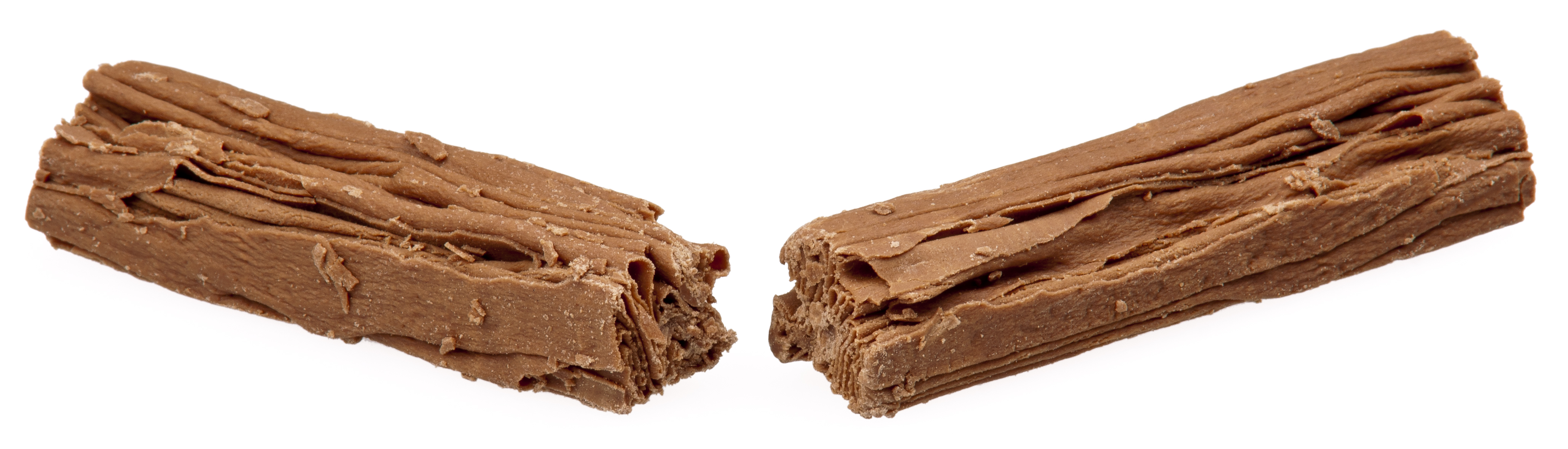
A Cadbury Flake split in half. They are popularly served in ice cream in a cone ("99 Flake").

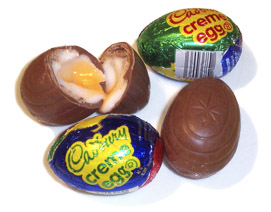
Cadbury Creme Eggs are sold between New Year's Day and Easter.

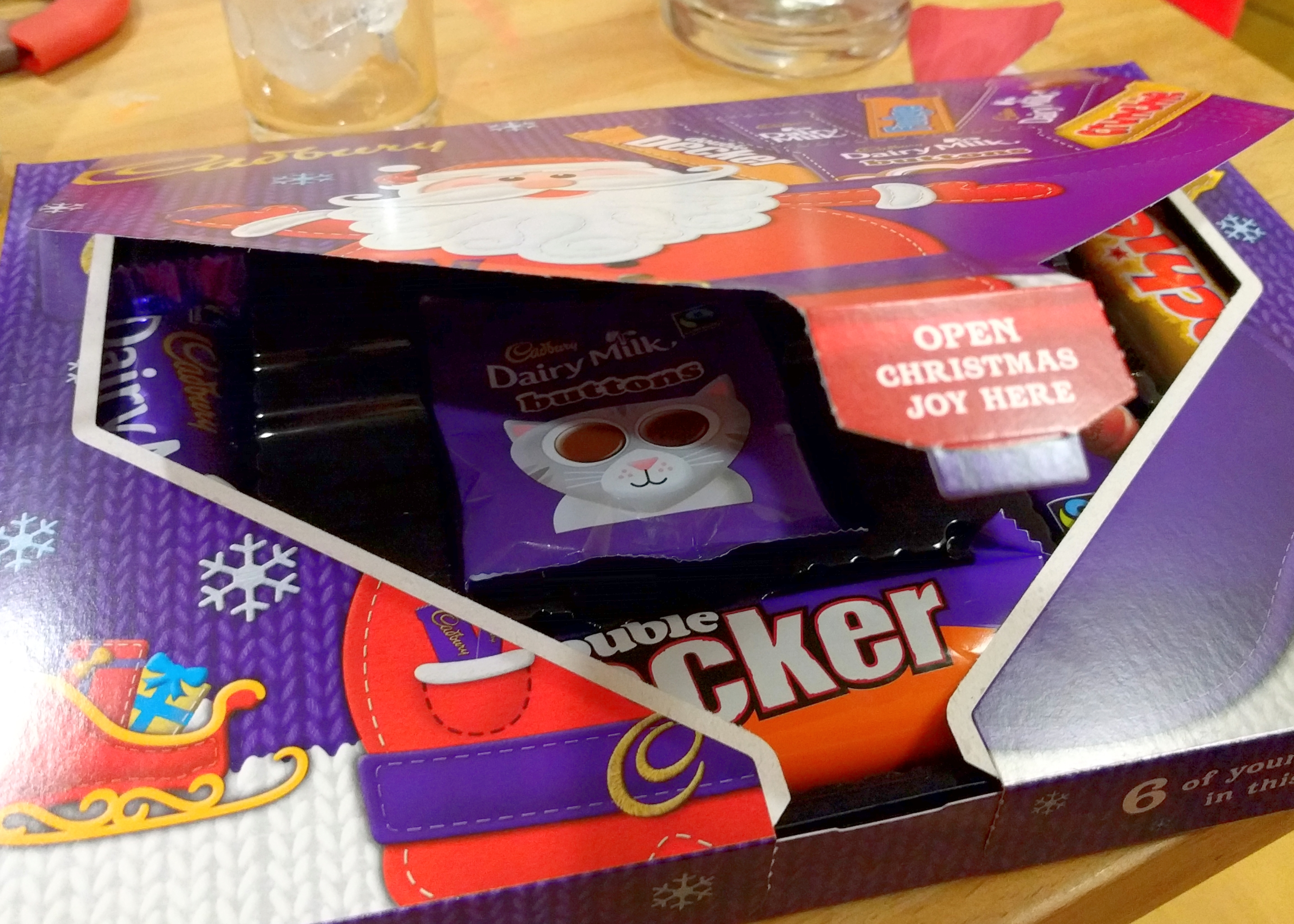
Cadbury's Christmas selection box. A boxed gift of assorted bars is a staple of Christmas, a tradition that in the UK goes back over 100 years.

Major chocolate brands produced by Cadbury include the bars Dairy Milk, Crunchie, Double Decker, Caramel, Wispa, Boost, Picnic, Flake, Curly Wurly, Chomp, and Fudge; chocolate Buttons; the boxed chocolate brand Milk Tray; and the twist-wrapped chocolates Heroes which are most popular around holidays, such as Christmas and Halloween (Cadbury Goo Heads (similar to Creme Eggs) are released for Halloween). Selection boxes (containing a selection of Cadbury bars and sweets) is a staple Christmas gift of chocolate, a tradition that in Britain goes back over a century (as are Cadbury Roses since the late 1930s). Creme Eggs are only sold between New Year's Day (or sometimes Boxing Day) and Easter—it is the most popular chocolate in the UK during this period, outselling its closest rival by 2 to 1.

As well as Cadbury's chocolate, the company also owns Maynards and Halls, and is associated with several types of confectionery including former Trebor and Bassett's brands or products such as Liquorice Allsorts, Jelly Babies, Flumps, Mints, Black Jack chews, Trident gum, and Softmints.

Notable product introductions include:

- 1866: Cocoa Essence
- 1868: Heart-shaped box of chocolates (for Valentine's Day)
- 1875: Easter Eggs
- 1897: Milk Chocolate and Fingers
- 1905: Dairy Milk
- 1908: Bournville
- 1914: Fry's Turkish Delight
- 1915: Milk Tray
- 1920: Flake
- 1923: Creme Egg (modern form launched as Fry's in 1963)
- 1926: Cadbury Dairy Milk Fruit & Nut
- 1929: Crunchie (launched as Fry's)
- 1938: Roses
- 1948: Fudge
- 1958: Picnic
- 1960: Dairy Milk Buttons
- 1965: Cadbury Eclairs
- 1967: Aztec
- 1967: Mini Eggs
- 1969: Cadbury 5 Star
- 1970: Curly Wurly
- 1974: Snack
- 1976: Double Decker
- 1976: Starbar
- 1981: Wispa (relaunched 2007)
- 1985: Boost
- 1987: Twirl
- 1989: Spira
- 1992: Time Out
- 1995: Wispa Gold (relaunched 2009 and 2011)
- 1995: Puds (relaunched 2021)
- 1996: Fuse (promotional relaunched 2015)
- 1997: Astros
- 1999: Heroes
- 2001: Brunch Bar, Dream
- 2004: Cadbury Chocolate Digestives
- 2009: Cadbury Clusters
- 2009: Dairy Milk Silk
- 2010: Dairy Milk Bliss
- 2011: Big Race Oreo
- 2012: Marvellous Creations and Crispello
- 2014: Pebbles
- 2014: Bubbly
- 2016: Cadbury Silk Oreo
- 2021: Cadbury Plant Bar (vegan)

== Incidents ==
=== 2006 salmonella scare ===
On 20 January 2006, Cadbury Schweppes detected a strain of the Salmonella Montevideo (SmvdX07) bacteria, affecting seven of its products. The contamination was caused by a leaking pipe, from which waste water dripped onto a chocolate crumb production line at the company's plant in Marlbrook, Herefordshire. It was not until around six months after the leak was detected that Cadbury Schweppes notified the Food Standards Agency, a delay which Cadbury Schweppes was unable to explain satisfactorily, and for which it was criticised. The Food Standards Agency ordered the company to recall more than a million chocolate bars. In December 2006, the company announced that the cost of dealing with the incident reached £30 million.

In April 2007, Birmingham City Council announced that it would be prosecuting Cadbury Schweppes in relation to three alleged offences of breaching food safety legislation. At that time, the Health Protection Agency identified 37 people who had been infected with Salmonella Montevideo. One of the alleged victims had to be kept on a hospital isolation ward for five days after eating a Cadbury's caramel bar. An investigation that was carried by Herefordshire Council led to a further six charges being brought. The company pleaded guilty to all nine charges, and was fined one million pounds at Birmingham Crown Court — the sentencing of both cases was brought together. Analysts have said the fine is not material to the group, with mitigating factors limiting the fine being that the company quickly admitted its guilt and said it had been mistaken that the infection did not pose a threat to health.

=== 2007 recalls ===
On 10 February 2007, Cadbury recalled some of its Easter eggs due to a labelling error. The products were produced in a factory handling nuts, potential allergens, but this was not made clear on the packaging. Cadbury said the products were "perfectly safe" for people without nut allergies to eat.

On 14 September 2007, Cadbury Schweppes investigated a manufacturing error over allergy warning, recalling for the second time in two years thousands of chocolate bars. A printing mistake at Somerdale Factory resulted in the omission of tree nut allergy labels from 250g Dairy Milk Double Chocolate bars.

=== 2008 melamine contamination in China ===
On 29 September 2008, Cadbury withdrew all of its 11 chocolate products made in its three Beijing factories, on suspicion of contamination with melamine. The recall affected the mainland China markets, Taiwan, Hong Kong and Australia. Products recalled included Dark Chocolate, a number of products in the 'Dairy Milk' range and Chocolate Eclairs.

=== 2014 pork traces in Malaysia ===
Cadbury recalled two chocolate products after it was tested positive for traces of pork DNA, namely Cadbury Dairy Milk Hazelnut and Cadbury Dairy Milk Roast Almond. The traces were found during a periodic check for non-halal ingredients in food products by the Ministry of Health in Malaysia which on 24 May 2014 said two of three samples of the company's products may contain pork traces.

On 2 June 2014, Malaysia's Department of Islamic Development (JAKIM) declared that the sample did not contain pig DNA, as claimed in earlier reports. This statement was made after new tests were conducted. JAKIM reportedly said that it tested 11 samples of Cadbury Dairy Milk Hazelnut, Cadbury Dairy Milk Roast Almond and other products from the company's factory but none of them tested positive for pork. The investigation followed reports that unscheduled checks had shown that two chocolates produced by Mondelez International Inc., the parent company of Cadbury, violated Islamic law and led to a boycott of all its products in the country.

=== 2017 "Easter" controversy ===
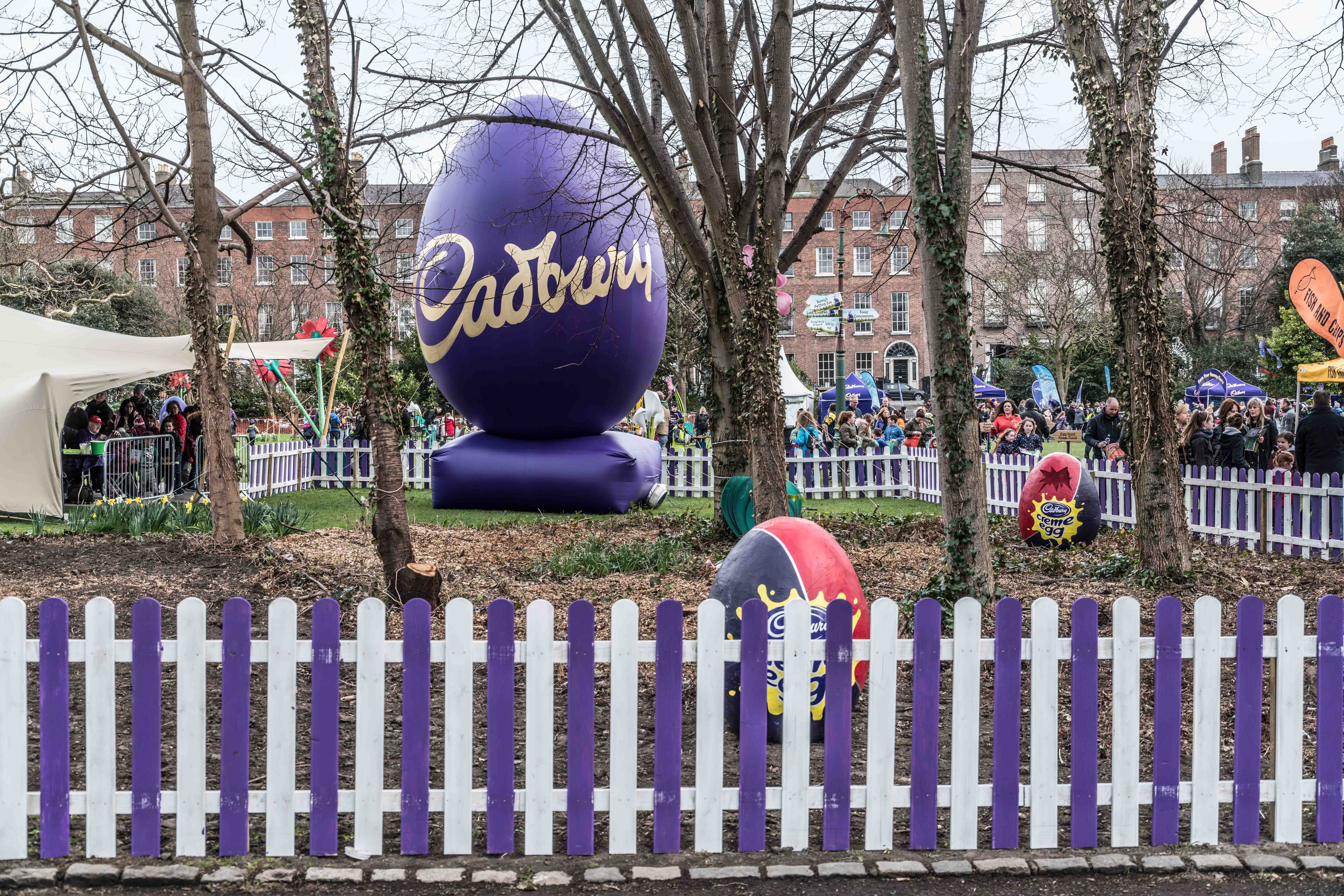
Sponsored by Cadbury, the annual Easter egg hunt (pictured in Dublin, Ireland in March 2016) takes place in over 250 National Trust locations in Ireland and the UK.

In 2017, the Church of England condemned the company and the National Trust for rebranding their annual "Easter Egg Trails" as "Cadbury Egg Hunts". Prime Minister Theresa May called the rebranding "absolutely ridiculous"; however, Cadbury dismissed the criticism, with a spokesperson saying, "it is clear to see that within our communications we visibly state the word Easter. It is included a number of times across promotional materials." An ensuing controversy followed in Australia, where Cadbury was accused of removing the word 'Easter' from the packaging of its Easter eggs. Cadbury Australia responded that Easter was mentioned on "the back of [the] pack", and that its eggs were obviously Easter eggs.

=== 2019 "Cadbury Treasures" campaign ===
In the run-up to Easter 2019, Cadbury launched a "Treasures" promotion in the UK and Ireland that, as well as listing treasure exhibits in various museums, unintentionally encouraged people to engage in illegal metal-detecting and digging at protected archaeological sites around the British Isles in search of further treasure. This prompted a highly critical reaction from archaeologists.

=== 2022 Channel 4 Dispatches child labour claims ===
In 2022, Cadbury Exposed: Dispatches aired on Channel 4 revealed child labour in cocoa farming for Cadbury chocolate. Mondelez International initially refused to comment before releasing a statement after the programme had aired. The network's journalists claimed Mondelez CEO Dirk Van de Put had "refused to be interviewed" but the company "did not dispute our findings (and were) deeply concerned by the incidents documented by Dispatches and would launch an investigation."

=== 2023 Listeria recall ===
In May 2023, Müller recalled six Cadbury desserts because of the possible presence of listeria, described as a "precautionary measure".

== See also ==
- List of Cadbury brands
- Cadbury World
- Cadbury family
- Cadbury Athletic F.C.
- Kryoryctes cadburyi
