= Cadbury Clusters =

Brand of confectionery by Cadbury

- Product type: Confectionery
- Country: United Kingdom
- Introduced: 2009
- Related brands: List of Cadbury products
- Markets: Worldwide

Cadbury Clusters are a chocolate based confectionery launched in the United Kingdom and Ireland by Cadbury in 2009. They are small nuggets that are sold in 150g bags, and are currently available in three flavours. The bags are re-sealable and paved the way for a redesign of the packaging of other Cadbury products such as Shots and Giant Buttons.

== Varieties ==
- Clusters: The basic version, Cornflakes covered in milk chocolate.
- Peanuts: Peanuts covered in milk chocolate.
- Raisins: Raisins covered in milk chocolate.

They are manufactured in Germany.
