= Bournville (chocolate) =

British confection

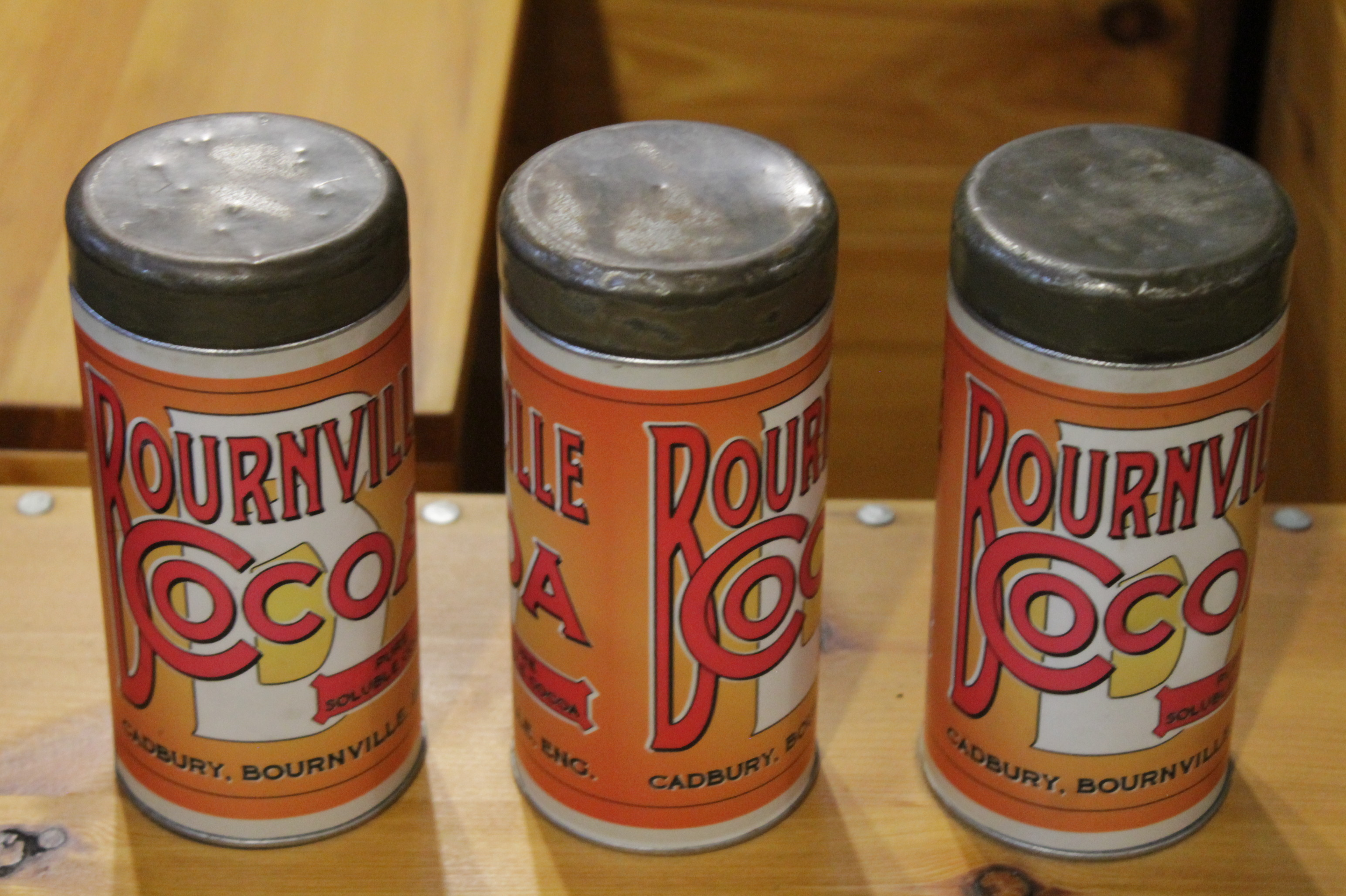
Cans of Bournville Cocoa powder c.1910

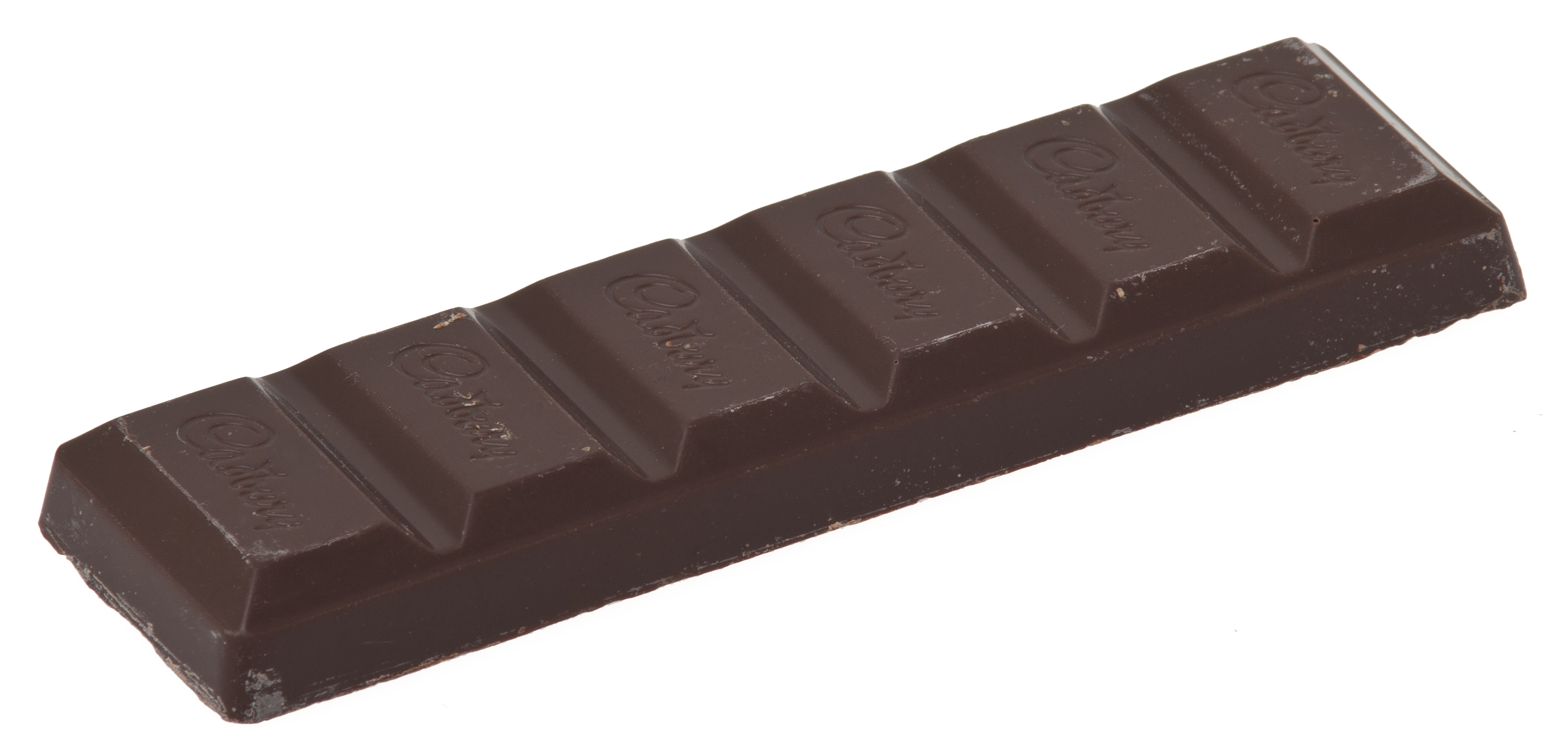
A bar of dark Bournville chocolate

Bournville is a brand of dark chocolate produced by Cadbury. It is named after the model village of the same name in Birmingham, England.

The first product bearing the Bournville name was Bournville Cocoa powder in 1906, followed by Bournville Chocolate in 1908. It was first sold as a wrapped bar named Bournville Chocolate in 1908.

The brand is widely available throughout the United Kingdom, Ireland, South Africa and India and has a minimum 36% cocoa content there. In 2014, Cadbury redesigned it as a "premium" brand in India, increasing the cocoa content from 44% to 50% and giving it new, black packaging.
