= Selection box =

Boxed gift generally associated with Christmas

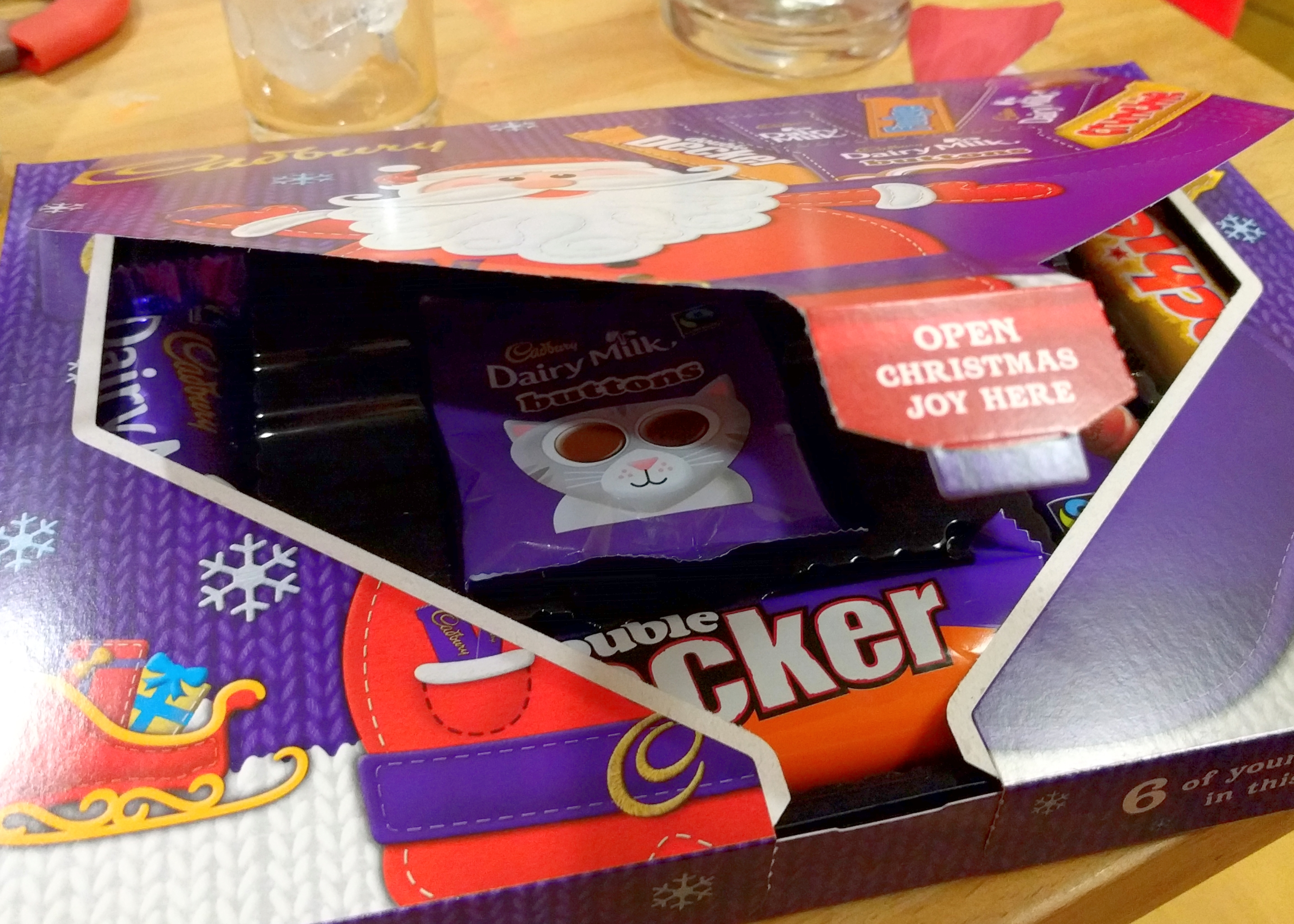
Cadbury's Christmas selection box

A selection box is a boxed gift consisting of a variety of edible items, usually chocolate based. They are generally associated with Christmas, particularly in the United Kingdom and Ireland.

== History ==
Selection boxes became common around the early 20th century in Britain. Chocolatiers, Rowntree's and Cadbury pioneered the early selection boxes which were saved for by way of a Christmas club over many months, to be collected around Christmas time. Choice and variation of contents were the consumer's choice, and often the value of the selection box would exceed a week's wages. In more modern times the selection box as we know it has become a staple Christmas gift of chocolate. Each chocolate company produces these at Christmas time and they often fill the spaces near supermarket checkouts. In the 1960s and 1970s the selection box took on a more commercialized approach with games printed on the reverse of the boxes such as snakes and ladders, adding to the desirability of each brand's selection box offering. Children expectantly received a selection box each year and regarded them as a main Christmas gift. More recently the commercial arms of the chocolate companies insist on filling their festive selection boxes with predefined chocolate bar selections, and many a child will receive in excess of six selection boxes each Christmas.

== Production ==
Chocolate selection boxes are sometimes packaged by hand and sometimes by robot. Hand picking is expensive, but early automated systems lacked flexibility; the layout or contents of a box could not be changed without making alterations to the machinery. Modern, computer-controlled robot systems can be easily reprogrammed as required. The foil wrapping of many selection box chocolates is a problem for the conventional metal detectors used in food factories to ensure that no loose machinery parts have accidentally found their way into the product. British chocolatier Thorntons overcame this issue by using an X-ray system.
