= Chomp (chocolate bar) =

Brand of chocolate bar

Australian Chomp Wrapper

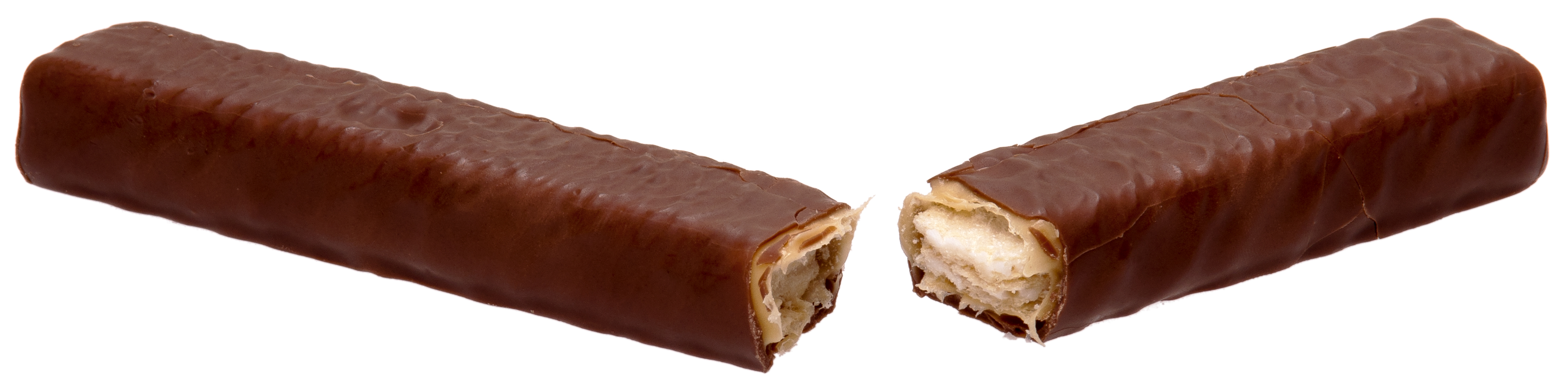
An Australian Chomp split

Chomp is a brand of chocolate bar which was first manufactured by Cadbury South Africa in the early 1970s, . It is currently manufactured and popular in South Africa, Australia and the United Kingdom.

== History ==
There are different versions of the bar available in each location. The Australian Chomp consists of a layer of wafer and caramel, coated in compound chocolate. The Australian chomp is also longer and thinner than the UK version, and comes in a 30g size. The Australian Chomp slogan is 'It's a monster chew!', and the packaging features a green T-rex named Tyrone wearing a hat, who also featured on Australian television commercials riding a skateboard.

During the 1970s, Chomp bars were marketed in Australia with the catchphrase “Ten cents never tasted so good.” Chomps produced in South Africa are sold both locally and across Southern Africa, where the packaging features a green Tyrannosaurus rex named Tyrone wearing a hat. The character also appeared in Australian television commercials, depicted riding a skateboard, alongside the slogan “Cadbury’s Chomp – the greatest chocolatey mouthful.” In South Africa and Namibia, the product is available in several sizes, including a 22.7 g bar, a 60.4 g strip, and a 360 g treat-size version. The advertisements for Cadbury Chomp in South Africa have been greatly popular since the early 1970s, and feature a father Hippo teaching his son to exercise his jaws in order to grab a full mouthful of chocolatey goodness.

In 2009, the UK version of Chomp got a new look, the 'C' resembles a mouth with teeth.

Chomp was produced in the Keynsham plant in Somerset, UK; however, in November/December 2010, production was to be transferred to Cadbury's new plant in Skarbimierz-Osiedle, Poland. Labels for these products do not state a country of origin, instead stating "Made in the EU under license from Cadbury UK Ltd".
