= Cadbury Buttons =

Button-shaped chocolate pieces sold by Cadbury

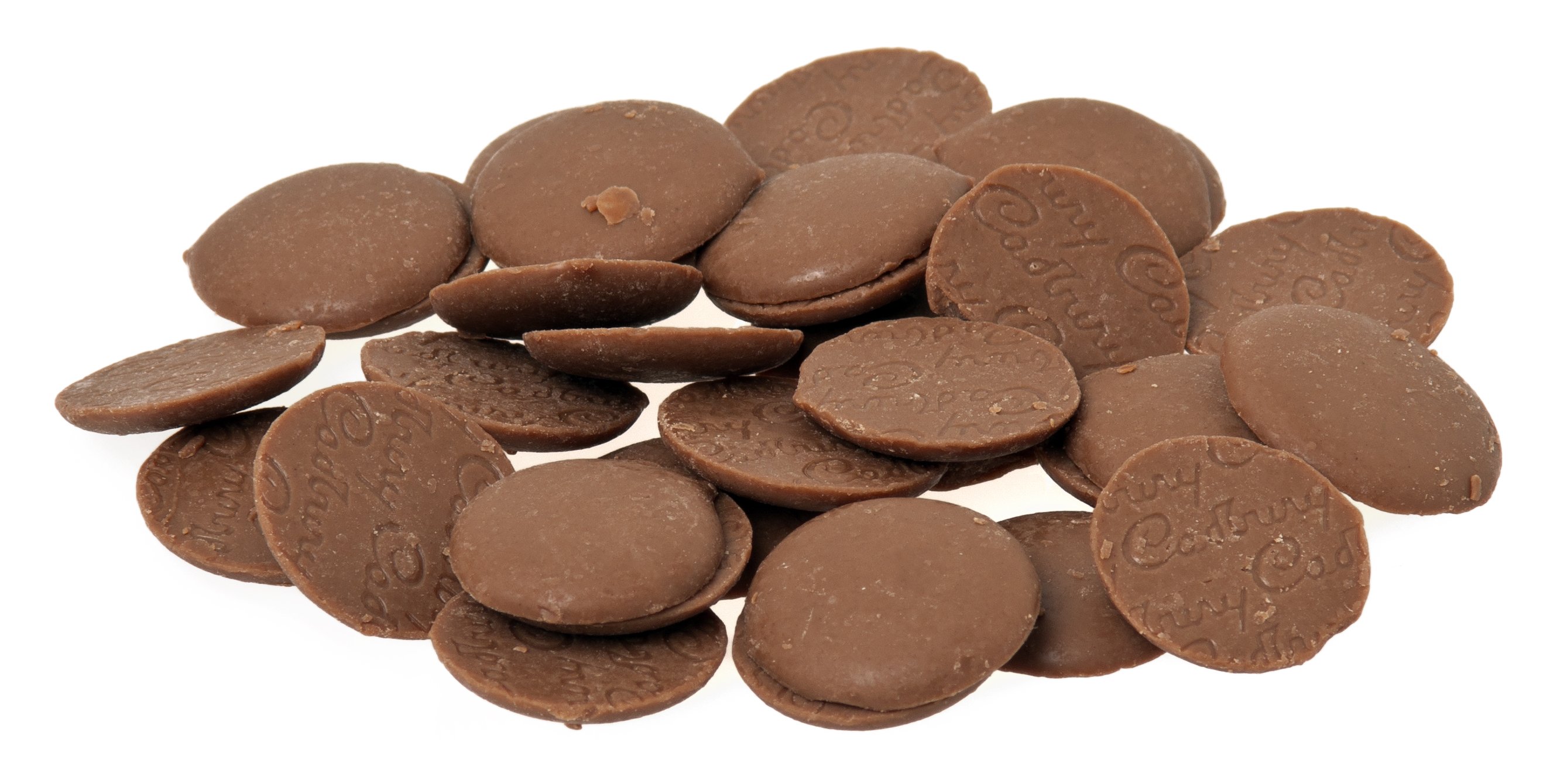
Milk chocolate Buttons

Cadbury Buttons are flat, circular, button-shaped chocolate pieces in small packs that were first sold by Cadbury in the United Kingdom in 1960. They are sold in Australia, New Zealand, Canada, Ireland and the UK. They are available in Cadbury's Dairy Milk and white chocolate. Giant versions of the buttons have also been produced. They are known for their circular design and feature cartoon animals on their packaging with their eyes being two buttons.

In 2022, the Giant Buttons packets in the UK were rebranded, retiring the old Cadbury logo that the packets had used since their launch 14 years earlier. The new style features a new Buttons logo that is transparent, lacking the word "Giant" on the packaging in line with the 2020 Cadbury logo. In the same year, Mega versions of the buttons went into production, which are even larger than the Giant Buttons. In 2024, a white chocolate variant of the Mega Buttons was launched.

As of 2023, treatsize Cadbury Buttons packets were discontinued from individual sale in the UK. Larger packets remained available for individual purchase, and treatsize packets would still be available in multipacks and Christmas ranges.

== See also ==
- List of chocolate bar brands
