= Souper Salad =

American restaurant chain

Souper Salad LLC
- Type: Private
- Industry: Restaurant
- Genre: Casual dining
- Founded: 1978; 48 years ago Houston, Texas, U.S.
- Founder: Ray Barshick
- Headquarters: Dallas, Texas, U.S.
- Number of locations: 3 (October 2022)
- Area served: Southwestern U.S.
- Products: salads • soup • pasta • bread sticks • desserts
- Parent: Brix Holdings, LLC
- Website: www.soupersalad.com

Souper Salad (stylized as Souper!Salad!) is an American restaurant chain based in Dallas, Texas. It is an all-you-can-eat buffet restaurant serving fresh salads, made-from-scratch soups, homemade breads, and more. All locations are in the Southwestern United States, with the majority located in Texas. The chain is privately owned and has been in operation since 1978. As of October 2022, the chain had 3 locations.

== History ==
In 1978, the first Souper Salad was opened by Ray Barshick in Houston, Texas. Barshick subsequently opened locations all across Texas and then began to expand to the Western United States.

In 2005, Souper Salad sold an equity interest to Sun Capital Partners, who changed the company's legal name to SSI Holding Group Corp..

By the middle of 2008, it had grown to 151 stores in 17 states before declining to 80 stores at the end of 2010 as a result of the long recession that began in 2008 causing fewer people to dine at restaurants. In 2009, the company began selling franchises.

In 2011, Souper Salad filed for Chapter 11 bankruptcy due to poor performance resulting from the recession. From July 2011 to the September bankruptcy filing, at least 25 locations were closed, leaving 56 locations in operation. In 2012, Souper Salad was acquired by LNC Ventures, which was owned by Dan and Jackie Hernandez.

By late 2013, the chain was down to 45 locations. In 2014, the company, with 37 locations, was acquired by Brix Holdings, LLC., which is based in Dallas. After the acquisition, Dan Hernandez remained president of Souper Salad until 2016.

== Locations ==
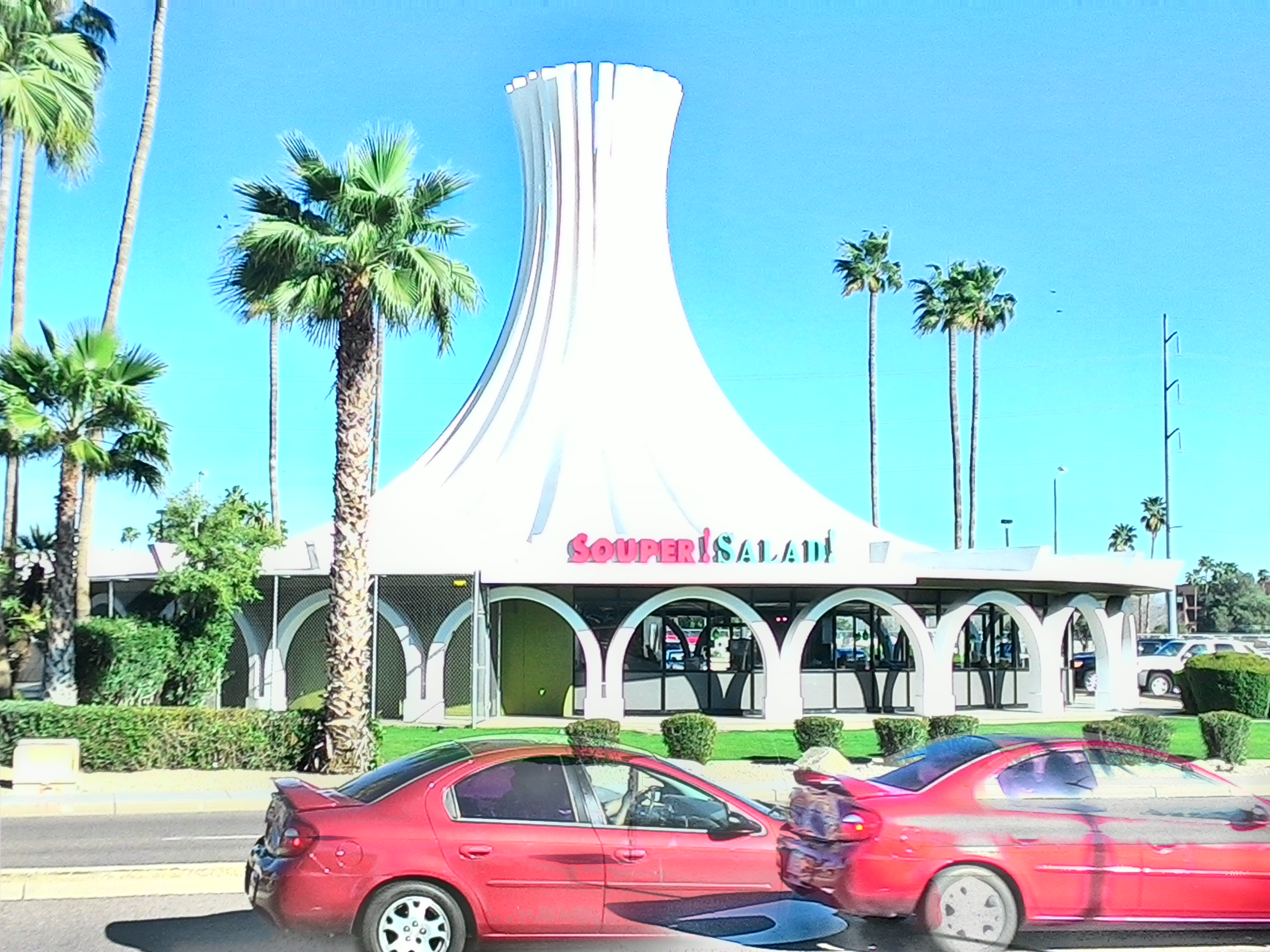
Souper Salad located in a "futuristic building" in Phoenix. This location is now a gun shop called Tombstone Tactical

The company currently operates three restaurants in Texas, located in Pasadena, El Paso, and Lubbock.

One location in Phoenix, Arizona was located in a former modernist bank building designed by architect Wenceslao Sarmiento. The building, originally home to a branch of Western Savings and Loan outside the Metrocenter mall, was listed as one of the "10 Coolest Buildings in M etro Phoenix" by Phoenix New Times in 2014 and an "architectural marvel" by AZfamily.com in 2016. When built in 1975, it was futuristic or mid-century modern with a ribbed conical tower clearly visible from the adjacent Interstate 17. This location closed in 2020 and is now a gun shop.

== Format ==
Souper Salad provides prepared salads and a variety of salad ingredients and dressings at a self-serve salad bar that can be 45 ft (14 m) in length. Four different soups are provided daily, as well as breadsticks, a selection of muffins, pizza, baked potatoes, pastas, tacos. Desserts include fresh and canned fruits, strawberry shortcake, pudding, brownies, and soft serve ice cream. Specific menu items change daily and seasonally. The company says the food is made fresh daily in each store (without use of centralized offsite facilities) and free of trans-fats since 2007. It also provides gluten-free, vegetarian and vegan options. It has offered a variety of seafood options including fish soups, salads, and tacos for the Lenten season. Sandwiches were tested in 2008 in San Antonio.

With the COVID-19 pandemic in 2020, all of the restaurants went to cafeteria style service.

== Marketing ==
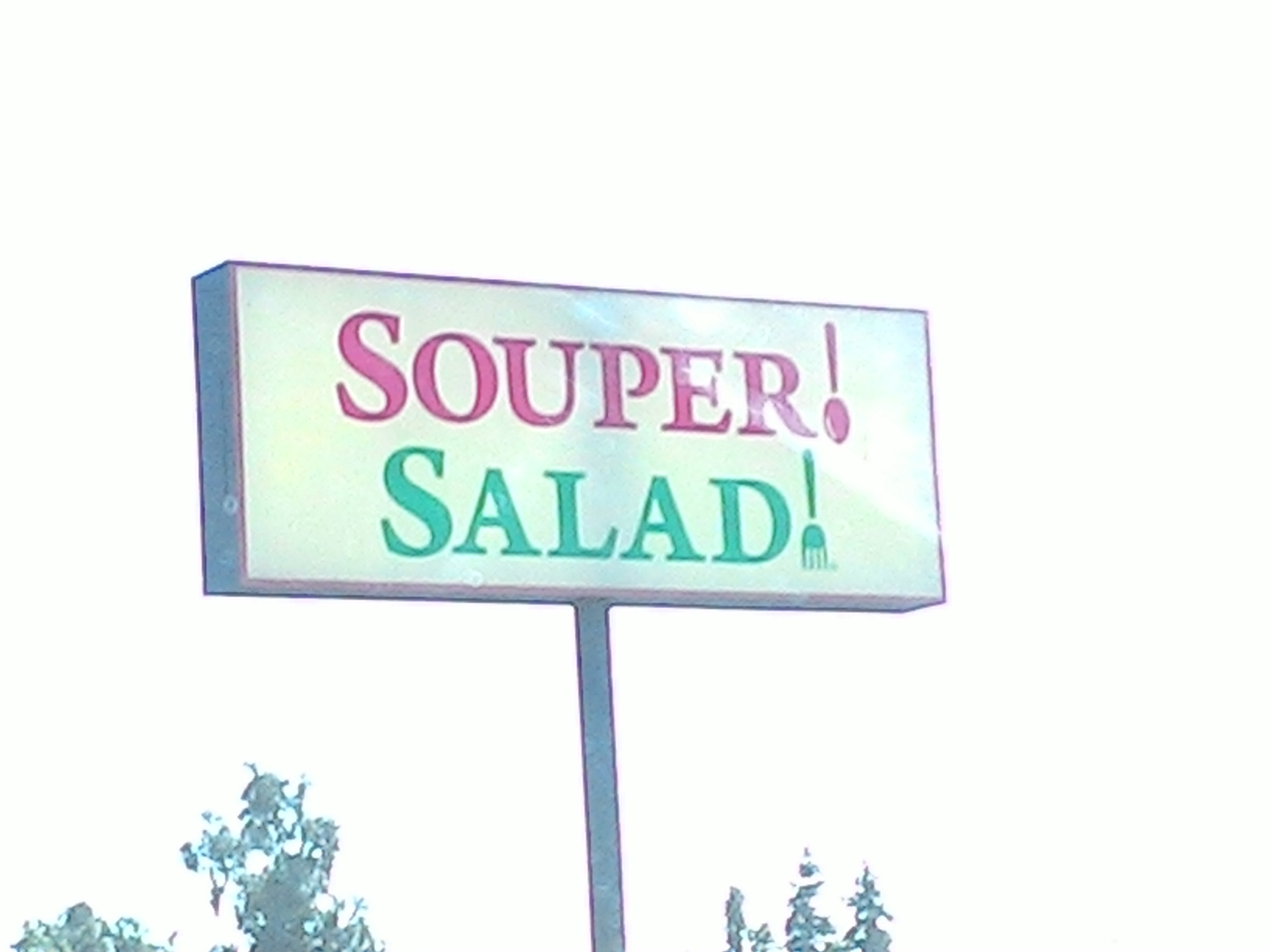
Signage

Customers who joined the Souper Fresh Club by providing personal information and an email address receive discount coupons electronically as well as a coupon for an annual free birthday meal. The program was later changed such that purchases earn "points" towards rewards as well as a coupon for a discounted birthday meal.

A study of casual dining chains by the consumer intelligence firm Market Force Information in 2013 ranked Souper Salad as the first in the buffet category. The study of over 7000 consumers praised the chain for the healthiness of its food.

== Litigation ==
In 2014, the company settled a class action lawsuit brought on by one employee alleging violation of the Fair Labor Standards Act. The suit claimed that this one tipped worker was not fairly paid for required duties such as cleaning, stocking, and other general activities that did not directly generate customer tips, thus having the effect of working for less than the minimum wage during the portions of shift spent performing such duties. The US Department of Labor says employees should not be classified as tip-only employees if they perform non-tipped work more than 20% of the time. Terms of the settlement were not disclosed. The suit asked for minimum wage differential compensation, as well as attorney's fees, and interest.

== LNC Ventures ==
Dan and Jackie Hernandez were 2002 graduates from the University of Texas and Texas A&M when they began frequenting an Austin Souper Salad. They operated ten Subway franchises in Laredo and Cotulla until 2010 when they were sold to another franchisee based out of Houston. They then purchased a Souper Salad in San Antonio and opened a second location in 2011. Their company, LNC Ventures later bought the chain after the 2011 bankruptcy for approximately $4 million. LNC divested many company stores to franchise-owned locations, with 22 of 45 locations being franchises by July 2013.

== Parent ==
Brix Holdings, LLC. acquired Souper Salad in 2014. Brix Holdings operates several other restaurant chains, including RedBrick Pizza, Red Mango Cafe, Smoothie Factory Juice Bar, and Greenz. Brix determined that reducing store size from 7,000 sq ft (650 m^{2}) by 50% made stores more profitable.

== See also ==
- Fresh Choice
- Sweet Tomatoes
