= Chocolate log =

Chocolate log may refer to:

- Mekupelet, a chocolate confection made in Israel, labelled "Chocolate log" in English
- Bûche de Noël, otherwise known as a Yule Chocolate Log, a chocolate cake eaten at Christmas
