= Souplantation and Sweet Tomatoes =

US-based chain of buffet restaurants

Souplantation Sweet Tomatoes
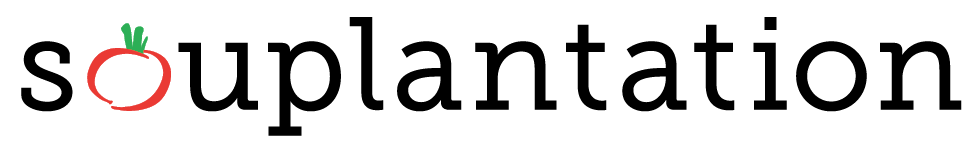
- Type: Private
- Industry: Food
- Genre: Restaurant
- Founded: 1978; 48 years ago (original); 2024 (revival)
- Founders: Dennis Jay
- Defunct: May 8, 2020; 6 years ago (original)
- Fate: Bankruptcy (Chapter 7 liquidation, original)
- Headquarters: San Diego, California, United States
- Number of locations: 97 (March 2020, prior to liquidation); 2 (June 2026)
- Area served: United States
- Key people: John Haywood (CEO) Don Breen (CFO)
- Products: Salad, soup, bakery, pasta, muffins, soft serve, fruits, vegetables, and other buffet and vegetarian options
- Number of employees: 4,400 (2020)
- Parent: Perpetual Capital Partners
- Website: sweettomatoes.com souplantation.com

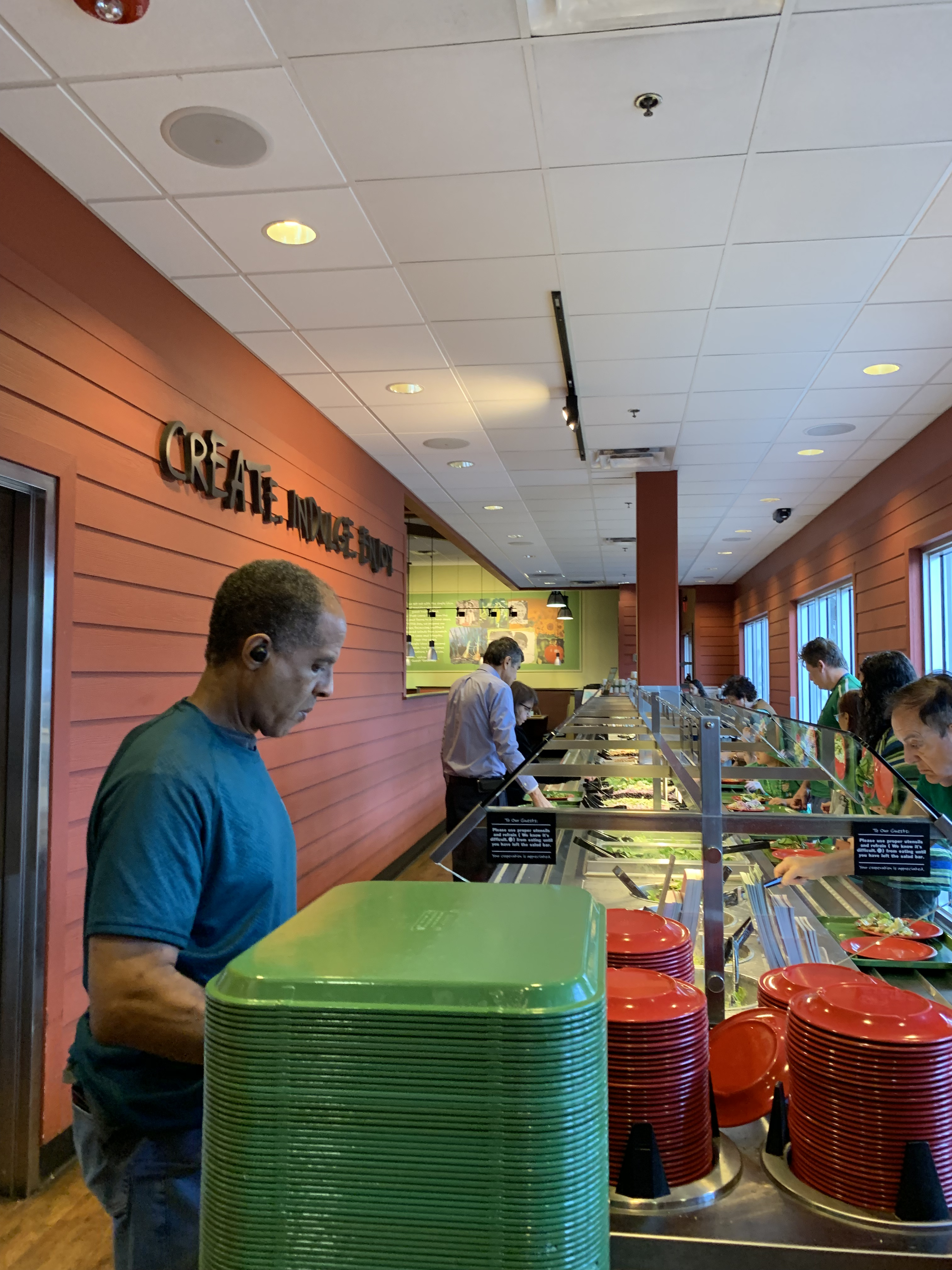
A Sweet Tomatoes in Kendall, Florida

Sweet Tomatoes, which operated as Souplantation (/ˌsuːplænˈteɪʃən/ SOO-plan-TAY-shən) in Southern California, is a United States–based chain of all-you-can-eat buffet-style restaurants. The first location opened in 1978 in San Diego, California, where the company was headquartered. The company was incorporated as Garden Fresh Corp. in 1983. The company went public in 1995 but was taken private in 2004. The company, owned by Garden Fresh Restaurant Corporation, temporarily closed its 97 locations in March 2020 in response to government mandates related to the COVID-19 pandemic. On May 7, 2020, the closure was made permanent and the company filed for liquidation. In 2021, Florida-based company ST Three LLC purchased the intellectual property rights and assets for the company, and the first location was reopened in Tucson, Arizona, in 2024. A second location reopened in Fort Myers, Florida, in 2026. According to the company website as of November 2026, a third location at 11179 Talbert Ave, Fountain Valley, CA 92708, will be opening in 2027.

== History ==
The first Souplantation restaurant opened on Mission Gorge Road in San Diego in 1978. It was the idea of Dennis Jay, who was a bartender at Springfield Wagon Works, a pioneer in salad bars in El Cajon. Dennis's friends, John Turnbull and Scott King, were opening their first Soup and Salad restaurant, The Soup Exchange. Dennis was impressed with the new concept and introduced Steve Hohe, the Springfield Restaurant manager, and Ron Demery, a bail bondsman and friend of John and Scott. Dennis, Steve, and Ron decided to partner to create a parallel concept, the Souplantation. The two concepts grew side by side in a friendly, mutually supportive, yet competitive environment for several years. This restaurant and a second one in Point Loma were purchased in 1983 by Garden Fresh Restaurant Corp, founded by Michael Mack to operate the chain.

The company expanded across the American West and Southwest and also opened locations in several Southeast states, including 23 restaurants in Florida. All of the restaurants were company-owned.

In 2005, an affiliate of the private investment firm Sun Capital Partners purchased Garden Fresh and with it the restaurant chains. In 2007, a Souplantation restaurant in Orange County, California, was linked to an outbreak of E. coli. The restaurant closed temporarily while authorities investigated the outbreak.

In October 2016, Garden Fresh Restaurant Corp, the owner/operator of Souplantation and Sweet Tomatoes, filed for Chapter 11 bankruptcy. At the time Garden Fresh was nearly $175 million in debt. In January 2017, the company said it expected to emerge from bankruptcy later that month, following a sale of the company's assets to New York–based private investment firm Cerberus Capital Management L.P. and its partners. Garden Fresh anticipated it would wind up with "between 90 and 104 restaurants" and "significantly less debt". In 2017, Garden Fresh and its restaurant chains were purchased by the New York City–based private investment firm Cerberus Capital Management.

In March 2020, all of the restaurants closed due to state and local government mandated shutdowns as a response to the COVID-19 pandemic. On May 7, 2020, the company announced it would be closing all Souplantation and Sweet Tomatoes locations permanently amid concerns that new federal guidelines recommending an end to self-serve stations would prevent local health departments from granting permits to restaurants with salad bars and buffets.

Garden Fresh Restaurants, the parent company to both Souplantation and Sweet Tomatoes, filed for Chapter 7 liquidation with the United States bankruptcy courts the following week on May 14. At the time of the announcement, the company had 4,400 employees and 97 restaurants.

In May 2022, a Souplantation restaurant not formally associated with the former company was announced. The location was set to open in La Mesa, California, in mid-2022, but in July was delayed without an opening date, and there were conflicting reports on whether the new restaurant would include recipes owned by the original company. Later reports indicated that the Souplantation in La Mesa would not be reopened and that the location would instead be occupied by a Golden Life ADHC daycare.

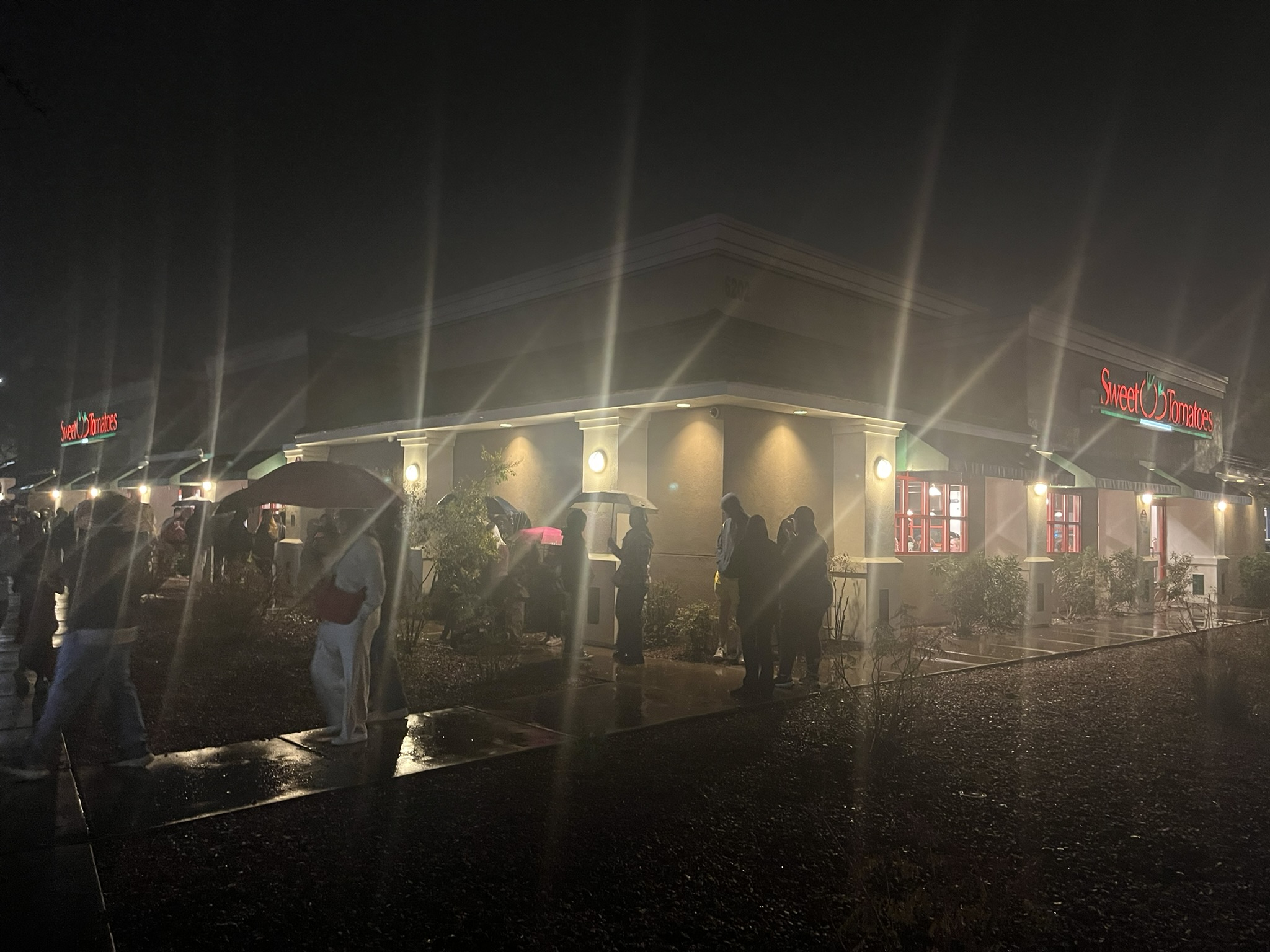
Sweet Tomatoes Re-Opening Night at their Tucson location

In March 2023, ST Three LLC purchased the exclusive rights and intellectual property assets of Souplantation/Sweet Tomatoes. One former location in Tucson, Arizona, on Broadway and Wilmot Road had initially been planned to reopen in fall 2023 but ultimately reopened on April 1, 2024. A second former location, on Tamiami Trail in Fort Myers, Florida, reopened on June 1, 2026. A third location is scheduled to reopen in Fountain Valley, California, in 2027, operating under its regional California name, Souplantation.

On February 28, 2024, a "nearly identical" "Souplantation knockoff" called "Soup 'n Fresh" was opened in a former Souplantation location in Rancho Cucamonga, California, by Bryan Lopez. On February 14, 2025, a second location was opened in a former Souplantation in Chino Hills, California.

List of revived Souplantation/Sweet Tomatoes locations
Location	Date Reopened
Tuscon, Arizona	April 1, 2024
Fort Myers, Florida	June 1, 2026
Fountain Valley, California	TBD (2027)

== Format ==
Souplantation and Sweet Tomatoes specializes in fresh salads and soups, and pasta, as well as bread, muffins, cornbread, and focaccia, baked on the premises. Most items are vegetarian.

The salad bar offers a wide variety of vegetables, fruits, nuts, seeds, croutons, and other salad condiments, as well as a few prepared featured salads, which changed monthly. Other sections include up to eight soup selections, a small bakery offering muffins, cornbread, pizza focaccia, and baked potatoes, a pasta section with a few different plates of pasta and sauces, and a dessert section offering fruit, puddings, and soft-serve ice cream. Featured menu items were rotated monthly and were typically themed, such as Asian, Greek, Italian, and customer favorites.

The company's home city of San Diego often served as a test market for new ideas and innovations, and was home to Souplantation's corporate offices. For example, some Souplantation and Sweet Tomatoes locations were open on Sunday mornings for breakfast. In 2011, the company launched its first quick-serve restaurant, called Souplantation Express, in Carlsbad, California.

== In popular culture ==
- Souplantation was the basis for the "Soup R' Crackers" chain that was a running joke on Party Down; the show's writers had originally planned to use the actual name of Souplantation, but the chain refused to allow it, necessitating the last-minute change to "Soup R' Crackers".
- The chain features prominently in the 1986 volleyball movie Spiker, with multiple scenes taking place at a Souplantation.

== See also ==
- List of defunct restaurants of the United States
- Fresh Choice
- Golden Corral
- Sizzler
- Souper Salad
