= Fresh Choice =

American restaurant chain

- Type: Private
- Genre: Restaurant
- Founded: 1986
- Defunct: 2012
- Headquarters: Emeryville, California, U.S.
- Key people: Sandy Boyd, CEO

Fresh Choice was a chain of buffet-style restaurants which operated in California, Washington, and Texas under the names Fresh Choice, Fresh Plus, Fresh Choice Express, and Zoopa.

== History ==
The first restaurant was opened in Sunnyvale, California, on El Camino Real in the Cala Shopping center in the space that was once Calaway's Bar and Grill by Martin Culver, Brad Wells, and Ken Oppeltz in 1986. Opening the first restaurant for under $140,000 using funds from Martin Culver's home equity line of credit, a cash investment from Brad Wells, and the restaurant background of Ken Oppeltz, the restaurant was an immediate success. The lines out the door prompted the trio to quickly search for a second location, which opened in the Moffett Business Park. Shortly thereafter, the group was approached by a venture capital group, raised several rounds of financing for expansion, and expanded by opening in the Stanford Shopping Center and Valley Fair Shopping Center, both former restaurant locations. Over a few years, Fresh Choice expanded to over 50 locations in California, Texas, and Washington.

Fresh Choice marketed itself as a healthier alternative to fast food restaurants with reference to menu options that include choices relatively low in fat, carbohydrates, and/or calories. All restaurants featured 50 foot salad bars, six freshly made soups daily, artisan pizza, and breads.

Fresh Choice obtained its produce from local farmers and tried to use seasonal, local, and organically grown produce. In 2009, the company embarked on a plan to grow many of its own vegetables. The Sacramento Magazine Diners' Choice Awards voted Fresh Choice as the restaurant with the most health-conscious menu in 2008 and 2009.

Fresh Choice was enrolled in PG&E's Climate Smart Program, through which Fresh Choice made voluntary charitable contributions that funded greenhouse gas capture and reduction projects to make its Northern California restaurants' energy usage carbon neutral. Additionally, Fresh Choice sponsored and participated in events such as the 2009 Sacramento Earth Day, California International Marathon and health fairs.

== Closures ==
In late 2012, Fresh Choice closed approximately half its locations. According to the Capitola-Soquel Patch, Fresh Choice planned on re-organizing the restaurants into a new concept of à la carte fare and charging people by weight for their salads. They would also have a beer and wine bar, a breakfast bar, and updated seating. Some locations that had been open for less than two years closed, and one location which was supposed to open in Stockton was permanently shelved, according to the company.

On December 15, 2012, it was reported that all Fresh Choice locations would be closing permanently and that two of the Bay Area locations had been re-opened under the name "California Fresh". The last Fresh Choice location was in Gilroy, which was a rebranded California Fresh restaurant and operated under independent ownership. It closed in March 2025.

== See also ==
- List of defunct restaurants of the United States
- Souplantation (also known as Sweet Tomatoes)
- Golden Corral
- Sizzler
- Souper Salad
