= 99 Flake =

Ice cream cone with a Flake chocolate bar

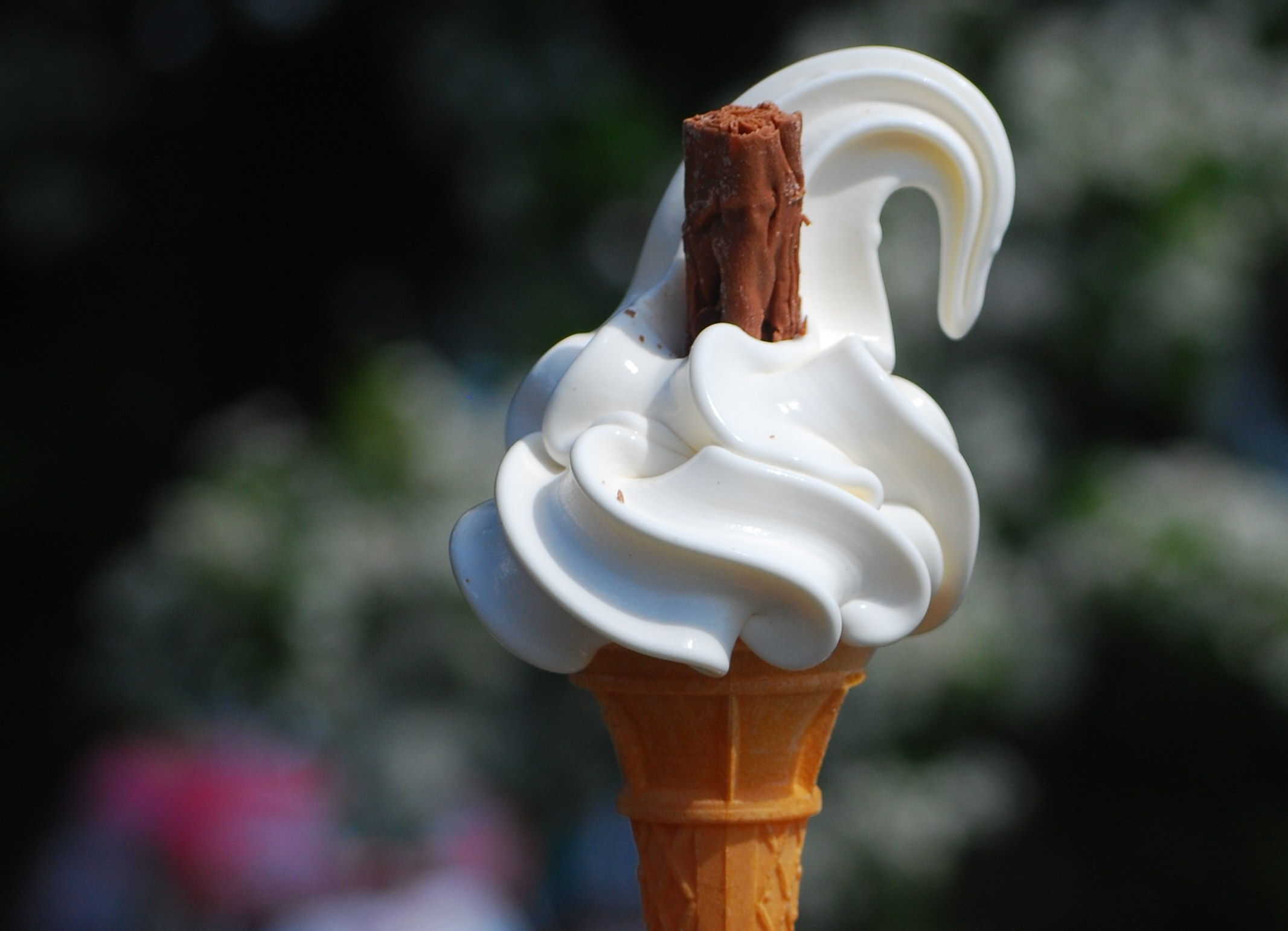
A 99 Flake, with a Flake chocolate bar

A 99 Flake or simply 99 (also ninety-nine) is an ice cream cone with a Flake inserted into it, commonly sold by ice cream vans in the United Kingdom and Ireland.

Created at the Cadbury's factory in Birmingham, England, the Flake was originally designed to be a cuboid and to fit into a wafer. By 1930, Cadbury's was selling half-length Flake "99s" specifically for serving in ice cream cones.

== "99" ice cream ==
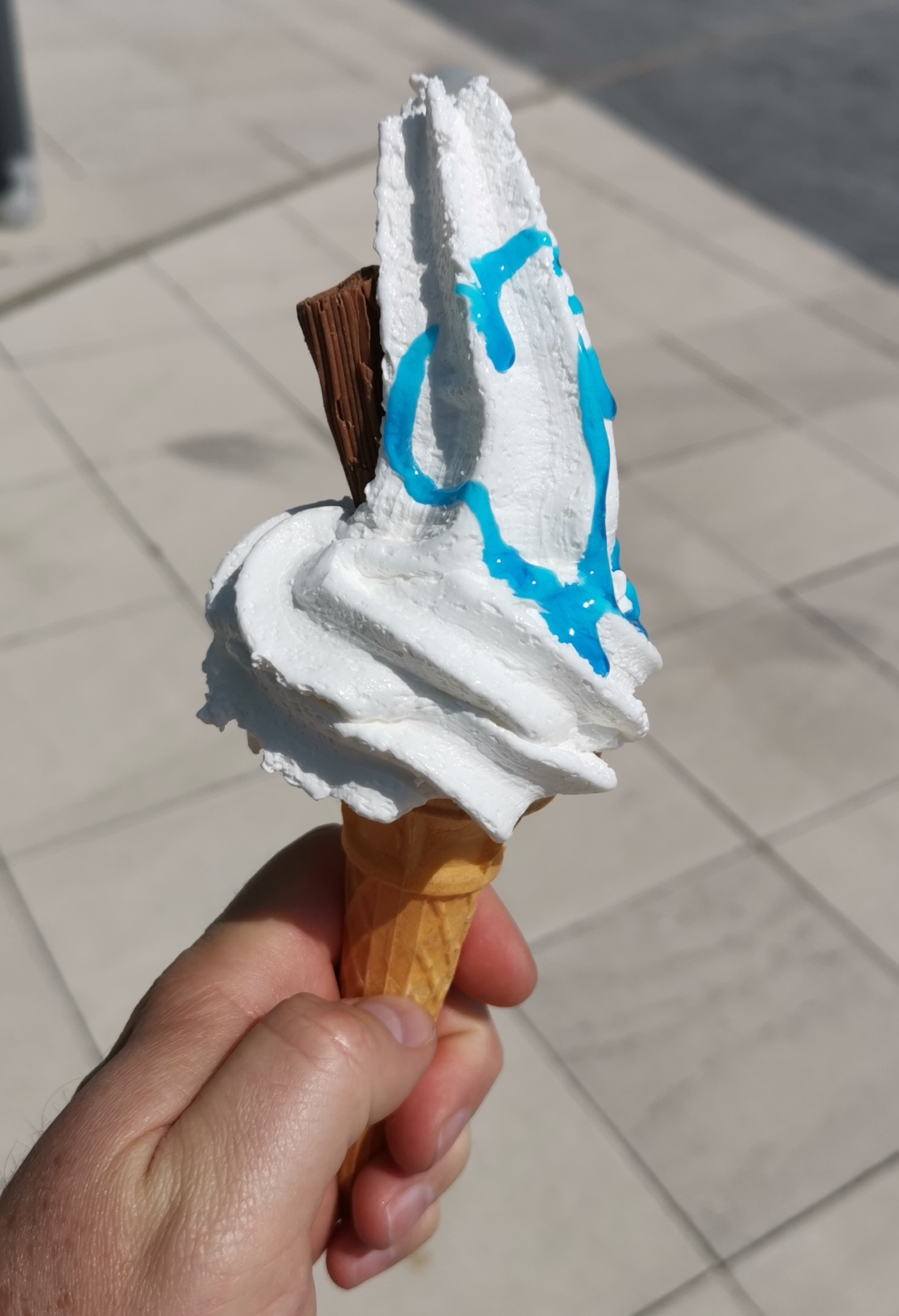
A 99 Flake garnished with bubble gum-flavour syrup

A 99 Flake is an ice cream cone, usually made with soft serve ice cream, into which a Flake bar has been inserted. The ice cream is usually vanilla flavoured. They are sold by ice cream vans and parlours. Variations include a 99 with two flakes – often referred to as a "double 99" or "bunny's ears" – and a 99 with strawberry or raspberry syrup on top, sometimes known as "monkey's blood".

== Cadbury 99 Flake bar ==
The Flake chocolate bar manufactured and marketed by Cadbury was first developed in the UK in 1920. An employee of Cadbury's noted that when the excess chocolate from the moulds used to create other chocolate bars was drained off, it poured off in thin streams, cooling into distinctive ripples of chocolate with crumbling properties.

The early "99 Flake" took the form of an ice cream sandwich. It consisted of a Flake bar inserted between two servings of ice cream, then placed between two wafer biscuits.

In 1930, Cadbury started producing a smaller version of the standard Flake bar especially for use with ice cream cones. These were marketed under the name 99 Flake and sold loose in boxes rather than individually wrapped like the traditional Flake.

== Name ==
The origins of the name are uncertain. One claim is that it was coined in Portobello, Scotland, where Stefano Arcari, who had opened a shop in 1922 at 99 Portobello High Street, would break a large Flake in half and stick it in an ice cream. The name derived from the shop's address. A Cadbury representative took the naming idea to his company. Another address-based claim is made by the Dunkerleys of Gorton, Manchester, who operated a sweet shop at 99 Wellington Street.

Another possibility is that the 99 was named by immigrant Italian ice-cream sellers, many of whom were from mountainous areas in Veneto, especially the Bellunes Alps, Trentino, and Friuli. The name was in honour of the final wave of Italian First World War conscripts, born in 1899 and referred to as i Ragazzi del '99 ("the Boys of '99"). In Italy they were held in such high esteem that some streets were named in their honour. The chocolate flake may have reminded the ice cream sellers of the long dark feather cocked at an angle in the conscripts' Alpini hats.

The Cadbury website says that the reason behind the name has been "lost in the mists of time". However, the website also references an article from an old Cadbury works paper, which states that the name came from the guard of the Italian king, which consisted of 99 men and thus "anything really special or first class was known as 99".

Count Binface, a perennial candidate in British politics who ran in the 2026 Clacton by-election, promised on his campaign to lower the price of 99 Flake ice cream cones to 99 pence each.
