= Cadbury Snowflake =

Brand of chocolate bar

Cadbury Snowflake was a chocolate bar manufactured by Cadbury.

Launched in August 2000, it was a crumbly rolled white chocolate inside covered in smooth milk chocolate, a white chocolate-centred version of the Twirl. Weighing approximately 32 g, producing a small bite size bars, it was produced and sold in the United Kingdom and Ireland. In 2003 the chocolate was renamed Flake Snow and was discontinued in 2008. It was subsequently launched for the first time in Australia in 2015.

== Turner Bovey wedding ==
Snowflake was promoted at the wedding of TV presenter Anthea Turner and her husband Grant Bovey. Having agreed to an exclusive £300,000 deal for photographs of the wedding reception to be published in OK! magazine, pictures showed the couple publicizing Snowflake. OK! magazine issued the photo to the media with the caption, "ANTHEA TURNER AND GRANT BOVEY exclusive OK! wedding photograph, enjoying Cadbury's new Snowflake. For the complete wedding coverage and a free Cadburys Snowflake, buy OK! magazine this weekend." The Sun, was the only newspaper to use the photo despite describing it as 'the most sickening wedding photo ever'. A Guardian journalist commented the stunt "genuinely derailed [Turner's] career".

== See also ==
- Flake (chocolate bar)
