= Flake (chocolate bar) =

British chocolate bar

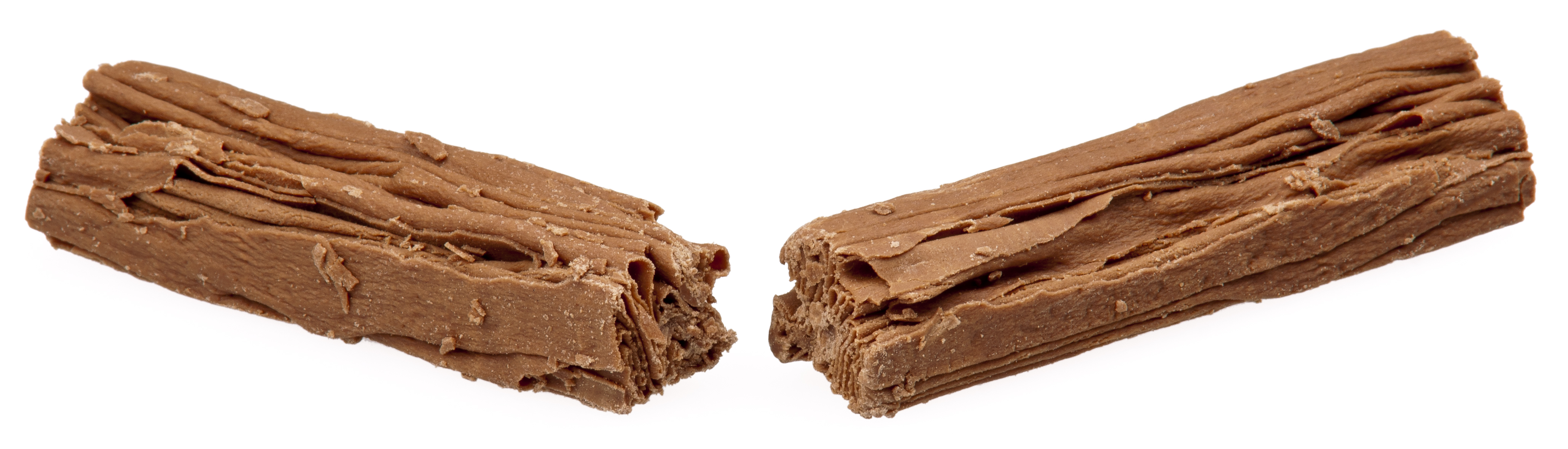
- Product type: Confectionery
- Current owner: Cadbury
- Country: United Kingdom
- Introduced: 1920; 106 years ago
- Related brands: List of Cadbury products
- Markets: United Kingdom, Canada, Ireland, South Africa, Australia, United States and New Zealand

Flake is a British brand of chocolate bar currently manufactured by chocolate company Cadbury. Consisting of thinly folded milk chocolate and oils, the bar has a unique crumbly texture.

== History ==
The original Flake product was first developed in 1920 and was discovered by chance by Ralph Thompson, an employee of Cadbury's at the Bournville factory who noticed thin streams of excess chocolate falling from moulds cooled into flaky ripples.

By 1930, Cadbury's was selling half-length Flake specifically for garnishing vanilla soft serve ice cream in a cone ("99 Flakes") which was served by ice cream vendors. First sold in the United Kingdom, they would later be sold in Ireland, Australia, South Africa and other nations. The later product, Cadbury Twirl, has two Flake-style bars covered in milk chocolate.

In 2021 and again in 2022, Mondelez announced that there were shortages of Flakes in the UK and Ireland. In 2021 this was attributed to high levels of demand due to good weather. In 2022, Mondelez attributed the shortages to "some global supply chain disruptions" alongside demand pressures.

== Manufacturing process ==
Cadbury refers to the exact process of making Flakes as a closely guarded secret; however, experimental evidence by Australian food scientist Ann Reardon shows that the result can be recreated by seizing chocolate.

Flakes were originally manufactured in Bournville but are now made in Dublin, Ireland, and 10th of Ramadan, Egypt.

== Variations ==
=== Flake bars ===
Several varieties of Flake have been produced over the years.

Name	Launched	Discontinued	Notes
Cadbury's Plain Flake; Cadbury Flake Noir; Cadbury Flake Dark	2000's (Australia); 2006 (UK)	2000's	A dark (plain) chocolate variety. It has been released under various different names across the world.
Flake Snow	2000	Mid-2000's	A version dipped in white chocolate. It was originally launched under the name Snowflake before being renamed in 200.
Cadbury Flake Dipped	2003	2000's (UK)	A version dipped in milk chocolate, similar to that of Flake Snow, and resembles a larger version of Twirl. It was also sold under the name of Flake Luxury. While no longer sold in the United Kingdom or Ireland, it is still available in South Africa, UAE territories and New Zealand.
Cadbury Flake Praline	2004	2000's	A version with a praline centre.
Cadbury Flake Allure	2011	2011	A variant half enrobed in rich truffle and Dairy Milk chocolate. Was sold as a limited edition.
Cadbury Orange Flake	Unknown	Unknown	A variant with orange flavoured chocolate. Sold in South Africa.
Cadbury Flake Mint	2016 (Australia)	Unknown	A variant with a pale green mint-flavoured centre. Sold as a limited edition in Australia in 2016. A similar variant was sold in South Africa, which had a mint-flavoured milk chocolate Flake.
Cadbury Flake Caramilk	2021	present	A variant with Caramel-flavoured chocolate (Caramilk). Sold in Australia.

=== Related products ===
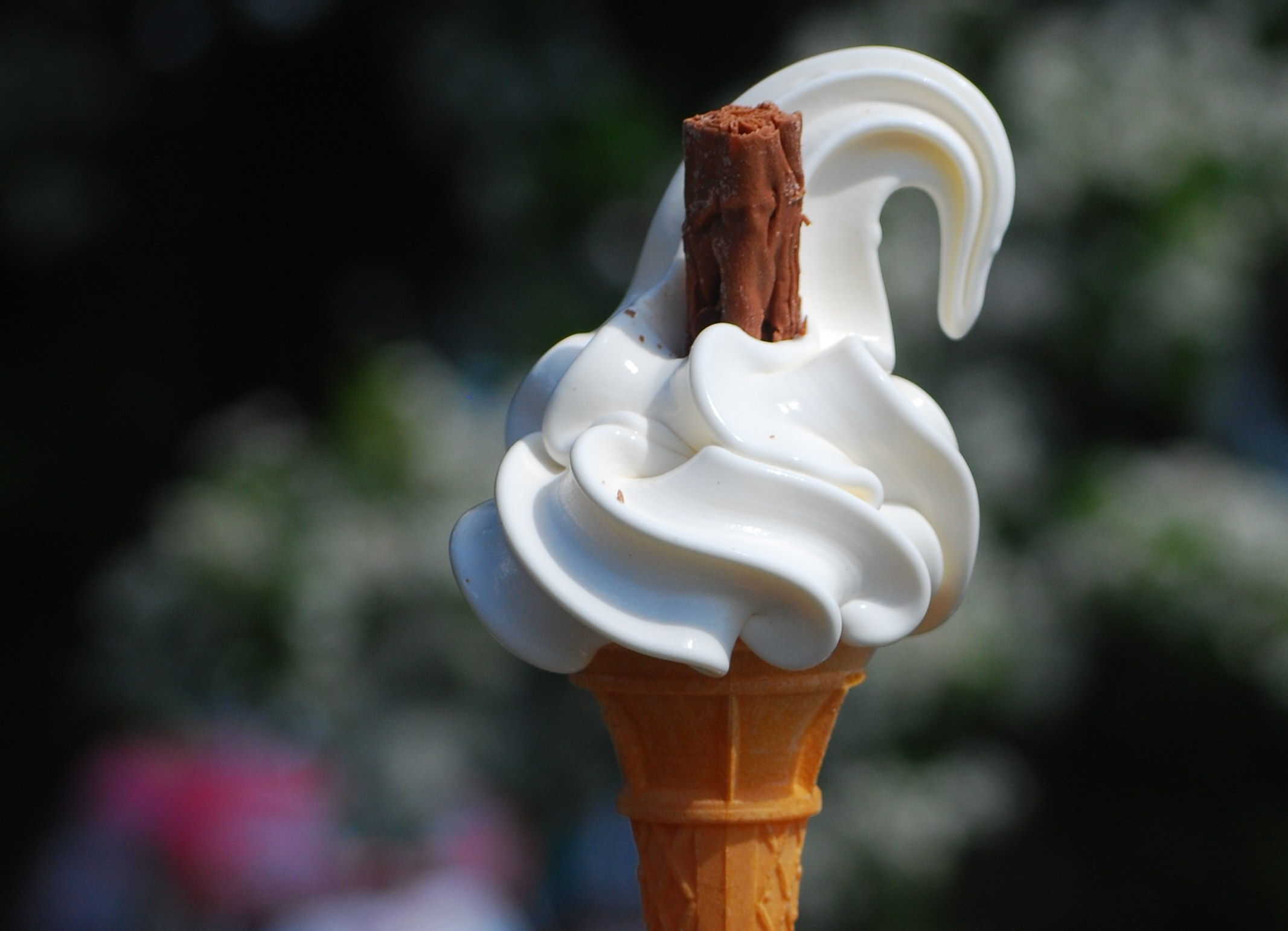
A 99 Flake presented as the topping for a soft-serve ice cream cone.

- 99 Flake - A short (usually half-length) flake bar, typically served as a garnish on ice cream.
- Flake McFlurry - a McFlurry with crushed bits of flake and chocolate. Limited edition run along with Flake McFlurry Raspberry.
- Flake McFlurry Raspberry - a McFlurry with crushed bits of flake, chocolate and raspberry juice. Limited edition run along with the original Flake McFlurry.
- Cadbury Twin Pot Flake
- Flake Bites
- Flake Minis
- Flake Moments

== Advertising ==
The product gained some notoriety for its highly sensual advertising since the 1960s. Television advertisements in Britain showed people – almost always women – enjoying a Flake whilst relaxing. The Flake Girl became famous as a symbol of indulgence and secret pleasure. Her emphasis – to a jingle ("Only the crumbliest, flakiest chocolate, tastes like chocolate never tasted before") – was on allowing herself a guilt-free luxury.

The Flake song in these advertisements was composed by British jingle writer Ronnie Bond, who also composed "Tasty tasty very very tasty" for Bran Flakes, and "I'd rather have a bowl of Coco Pops" for Coco Pops. Former Tyrannosaurus Rex percussionist Steve Peregrin Took wrote a song, Peppermint Flickstick, in 1970 as a satire on the campaign. The song was recorded that year by his band Shagrat and released in 1990.

In 1999, a tribute advertisement to the Flake Girls of decades past was released. The montage began with a clip of the very first Flake Girl advertisement from 1959, followed by a 1965 clip of a girl relaxing in a rowing boat whilst being pestered by a cheeky swan for a peck of her Flake bar. The next clip showed the 1973 advertisement of a doe-eyed artist in a field of poppies painting a watercolour and indulging in a Flake bar, before being caught in a summer shower. This was followed by a clip of the exotic 1987 ad in which a restless woman in silk negligee reposes on a window sill on a sultry night, indulging in a Flake bar whilst a gecko lizard is noted crawling over a ringing telephone. Next was a clip of the classical 1991 Flake advertisement in which a woman sporting a dark, cropped hairstyle reposes in an overflowing bath tub in a great painted hall. Lastly, this tribute montage advertisement ended with the latest Flake Girl advertisement (1999), featuring a Parisienne (portrayed by Mexican model Liliana Dominguez) relaxing in a summery garden overlooking the Eiffel Tower. As she bites into the Flake bar in her ice-cream, the garden sprinklers are set off and she is drenched in refreshing water.

The Flake girl was finally retired after 40 years, in 2004. However, in 2005 she was found to have a 19% recall in the UK population, leading to a revival in 2007. The new advertisement featured Australian model Alyssa Sutherland eating a Flake in a convertible during a shower of rain. British singer Joss Stone became the new Flake girl in 2008 – the first non-model to promote the product. In the television advertisement she is seen breaking off a small piece of Flake before popping it into her mouth and brushing the crumbs off her blouse whilst softly singing the Flake theme song.

Cadbury dropped the "Only the crumbliest, flakiest chocolate, tastes like chocolate never tasted before" tagline after 50 years in 2010. On 8 June 2010, a new advertisement (first aired on Channel 4) saw a woman float around on a black background. Whilst part of 'The Flake girl' series, there is no mention of any text or slogan aside from the image of the bar at the end of the advertisement, and the familiar music jingle is replaced by a haunting piano piece.

=== Flake girls ===
- In 1984, the 20-year-old female model in the Flake advert dated the tennis player John McEnroe, after meeting at a party in mid-June 1984. She also dated the English tennis player Buster Mottram. She later appeared in Casanova.
- The actress in the canoe advert, Catrina Skepper, appears in the opening sequence of The Living Daylights, of 1987, and appeared as a presenter on the BBC The Heaven and Earth Show in the late 1990s. Aged 26 in 1989, she dated Viscount Linley. Her father's sister, Gillian Mary Skepper, from Neuilly-sur-Seine, married Sir Adrian Cadbury on Saturday 16 June 1956 at St Paul's Church, Knightsbridge. Gillian was a debutante in 1953. Adrian was a Cambridge and Olympic rower in 1952. Catrina's cousin was called Cadbury. Another brother of Gillian is Olympic skier Robert Skepper. Both Adrian Cadbury and Catrina's father studied Economics together, at Cambridge. Catrina's father went to Trinity College, Cambridge, and skied for Cambridge.
- Debbie Leng in 1987

== See also ==
- List of chocolate bar brands
- Mekupelet
