= Mekupelet =

Chocolate confection made in Israel

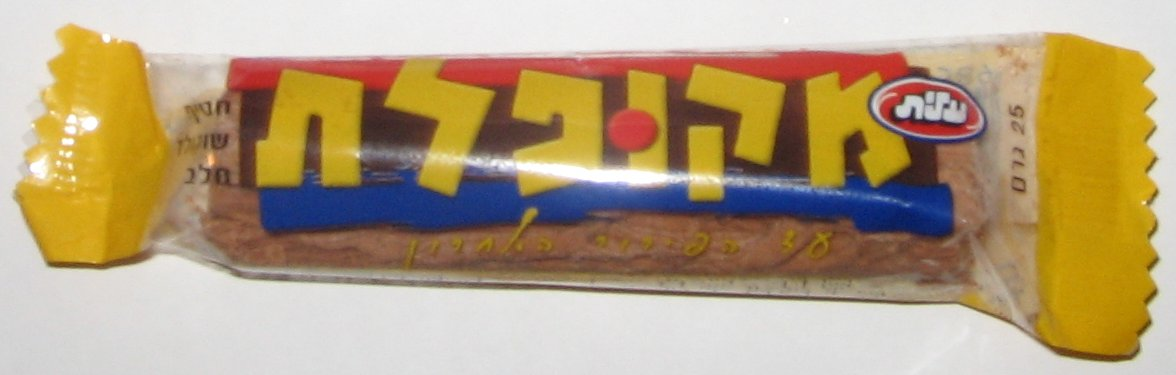
- The Mekupelet bar in its Hebrew-language wrapper
- Type: Dessert bar
- Place of origin: Israel
- Main ingredients: Milk chocolate

Mekupelet (Hebrew: מקופלת) (sold in English-speaking markets as Chocolate Log) is a bar of thinly folded milk chocolate produced in Israel since 1935 by Elite, now a subdivision of the Strauss Group. The Hebrew name means "folded". It is known for its crumbliness and thin flakes and has been compared to the British chocolate bar known as Cadbury Flake.

Mekupelet is exported to overseas markets. Mekupelet is also produced in a 'Mehadrin' version through the Magadim factory of the Strauss Group.

== History ==
In 1992, the motto "Mekupelet – down to the last crumb" was launched.

== Variations ==
Several varieties of Mekupelet have been produced over the years, including:

- dark chocolate
- white chocolate
- mini-version
- extended length (XL)
- blue and white, to celebrate Israel's 55th year of existence
