= Soft serve =

Frozen dessert

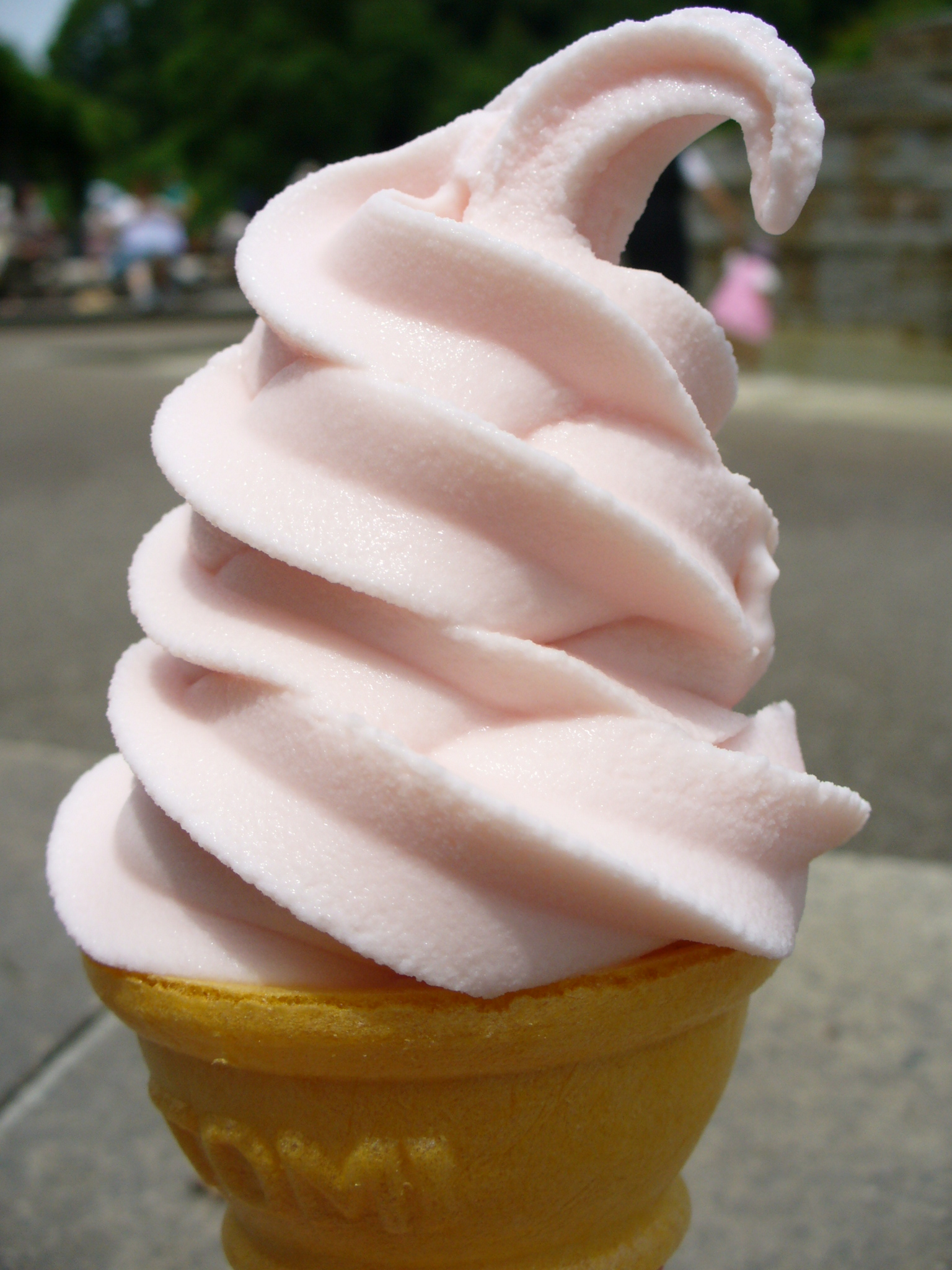
Soft serve in an ice cream cone

Soft serve, also known as soft ice cream, is a frozen dessert and variety of ice cream, similar to conventional ice cream, but softer and less dense due to the introduction of air during the freezing process. Soft serve has been sold commercially since the late 1930s in the United States.

In the United States, soft serve is not typically sold prepackaged in supermarkets but is common at fairs, carnivals, amusement parks, restaurants (especially fast food and buffet), and specialty shops. All ice cream must be frozen quickly to avoid crystal growth. With soft serve, this is accomplished by a special machine that holds pre-mixed product at a very low, but not frozen, temperature at the point of sale.

== History ==
Charles Taylor of Buffalo, New York, patented an automatic ice cream maker in 1926 "that used pre-made ingredients and whipped them into a smooth and consistent texture." It was considered a precursor for future soft-serve machines.

Over Memorial Day weekend of 1934, Tom Carvel, the founder of the Carvel brand and franchise, suffered a flat tire in his ice cream truck in Hartsdale, New York. He pulled into a parking lot and began selling his melting ice cream to vacationers driving by. Within two days, he had sold his entire supply of ice cream and concluded that both a fixed location and soft (as opposed to hard) frozen desserts were potentially good business ideas. In 1936, Carvel opened his first store on the original broken down truck site and developed a secret soft-serve ice cream formula as well as patented super low temperature ice cream machines.

Dairy Queen also claims to have invented soft serve. In 1938, near Moline, Illinois, J. F. McCullough and his son, Alex, developed their soft-serve formula. Their first sales experiment was on August 4, 1938, in Kankakee, Illinois, at the store of their friend, Sherb Noble. Within two hours of the "all you can eat" trial sale, they had dished out more than 1,600 servings—more than one every 4.5 seconds.

Carvel and Dairy Queen franchising helped make soft serve ice cream very popular by the 1950s. The United States Department of Agriculture reported in 1956 that consumption of soft ice cream had jumped over 25 percent every year since World War II. By 1956 there were approximately 12,000 locations in the United States offering soft serve ice cream. McDonald's began offering soft serve in 1956 using machines manufactured by Taylor's company, and they helped bring it to a global audience.

It is a common myth that during the late 1940s, future UK prime minister Margaret Thatcher worked briefly as a chemist for a food manufacturer J. Lyons and Co., at a time when the company had partnered with the United States distributor Mister Softee and was developing a soft-serve recipe that was compatible with the American machines. Thatcher's precise role at Lyons is unclear, but she is reported to have worked on the quality of cake and pie fillings as well as ice-cream, and researched saponification.

In the 1960s, ice cream machine manufacturers introduced mechanized air pumps into vending machines, providing better aeration.

In the 1990s, Wadden Systems, Inc. introduced the 24 Flavor System, which enables an operator to transform soft serve into 24 or more flavors of soft serve, on a cone to cone basis.

== Characteristics ==
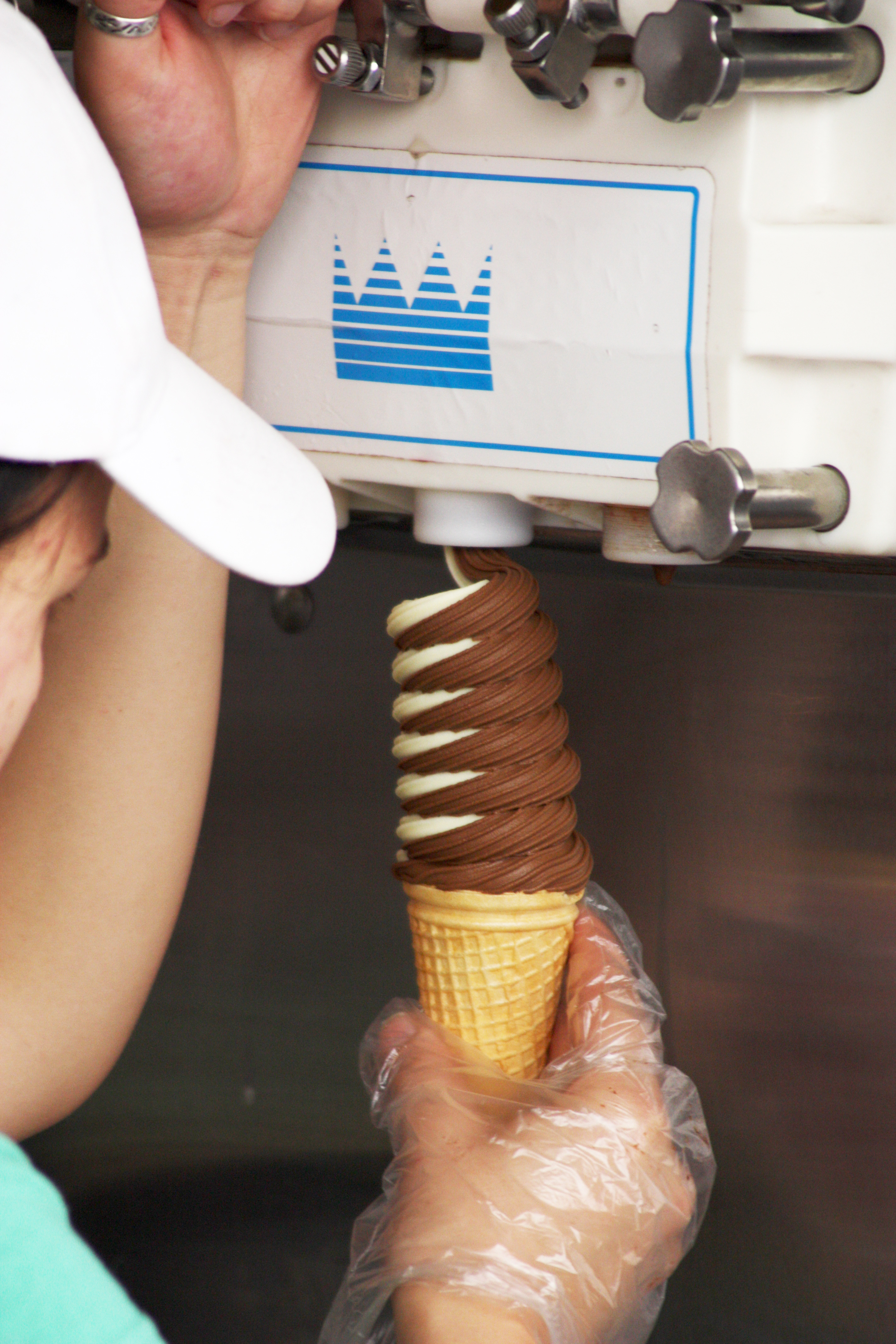
A mixture of chocolate and vanilla soft serve being dispensed, a flavor colloquially referred to as swirl or twist

Soft serve is generally lower in milk-fat (3 to 6 percent) than conventional ice cream (10 to 18 percent) and is produced at a temperature of about −4 °C (25 °F), compared to conventional ice cream, which is stored at −15 °C (5 °F). Soft serve contains air, introduced at the time of freezing. The air content, called overrun, can vary from 0 to 60 percent of the total volume of the finished product. The amount of air alters the taste of the finished product. Product with low quantities of air has a heavy, icy taste and appears more yellow. Ice cream with higher air content has a creamier, smoother, and lighter texture and appears whiter. The optimum quantity of air is determined by other ingredients, if any, and individual taste. Generally, the ideal air content should be between 33 and 45 percent of volume. If more than this, the product loses taste, tends to shrink as it loses air, and melts more quickly than that with less air. With less than 33 percent, the ice cream will not melt as quickly but the taste will be negatively affected.

Ice cream and similar products must be frozen quickly to avoid crystal growth. Moreover, when the soft serve is stored below freezing temperature after dispensing for a substantial time, it will soon freeze solid. Thus, to sell and consume soft serve in its most palatable state, it must be prepared by a special machine at the point of sale. Pre-mixed product (see definitions below) is introduced to the storage chamber of the machine where it is kept at 3 °C (37 °F). When the product is drawn from the draw valve, a fresh mix combined with the targeted quantity of air is introduced to the freezing chamber by gravity or pump. It is then churned, quickly frozen, and stored until required.

While the most basic machines only dispense one flavor of the mix at a time, specific models of soft-serve machines have an additional nozzle that dispenses a mixture of two different flavors simultaneously. This mixture emerges in a distinct swirl pattern. Its distinctive flavor on menus is classified as swirl or twist.

Pre-mix can be obtained in several forms:

- Fresh liquid that requires constant refrigeration until needed. It can be stored for 5 to 7 days before bacteria spoil it. Bacterial contamination can severely compromise quality, and handlers must exercise caution to maintain quality.
- A powdered mix. This is a dried version of the liquid mixture. It has the advantage of easy distribution and can be stored for long periods without spoiling. Water must be added before being churned and frozen. The disadvantage is that water quality cannot be guaranteed, and some operators can put too much water in to make it go further. It should also be refrigerated to 3 °C (37 °F) before use, as airborne and waterborne bacteria can infect it immediately and proliferate if the product is warm. Residual bacteria in the refrigerated storage compartment can also be activated by introducing warm products.
- Ultra heat treated mix, a liquid that has been sterilized and packed in sealed, sterile bags. It can last very long without refrigeration and can be poured into the soft-serve freezer immediately upon opening. However, it should be refrigerated to 3 °C (37 °F) before use for the same reasons mentioned above. When opening, quality can be guaranteed, and bacterial counts are zero. Where it is available, health authorities consider it the safest form of soft-serve mix on the market. It was first developed for commercial use in New Zealand in 1988 in a joint venture between Tatua Foods, a dairy company, and Bernie Cook, owner of Blue Boy, a mobile franchise network.

== Terminology ==
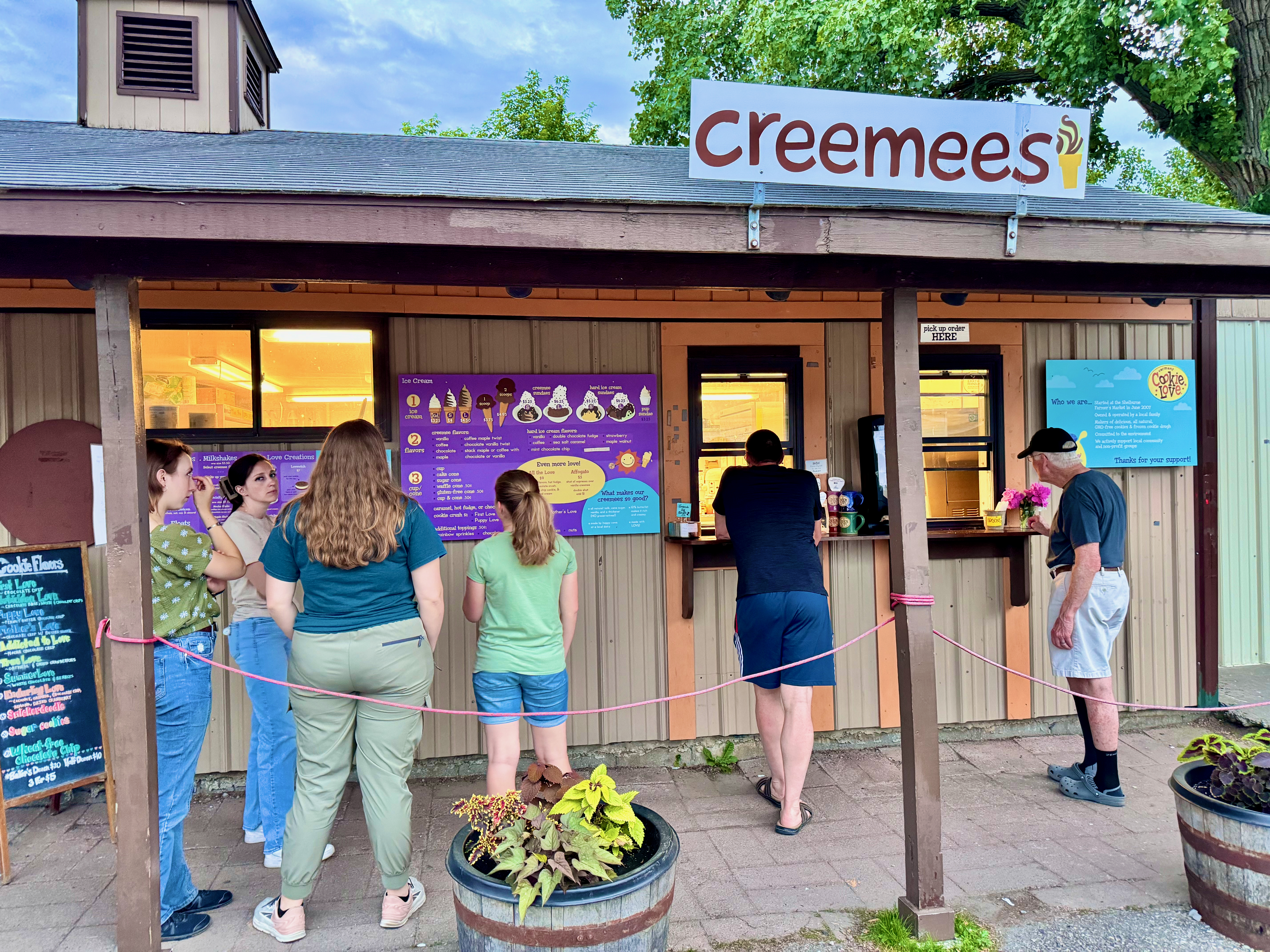
Customers line up for creemees in Vermont

Various terms are used for soft-serve ice cream depending on country and region:

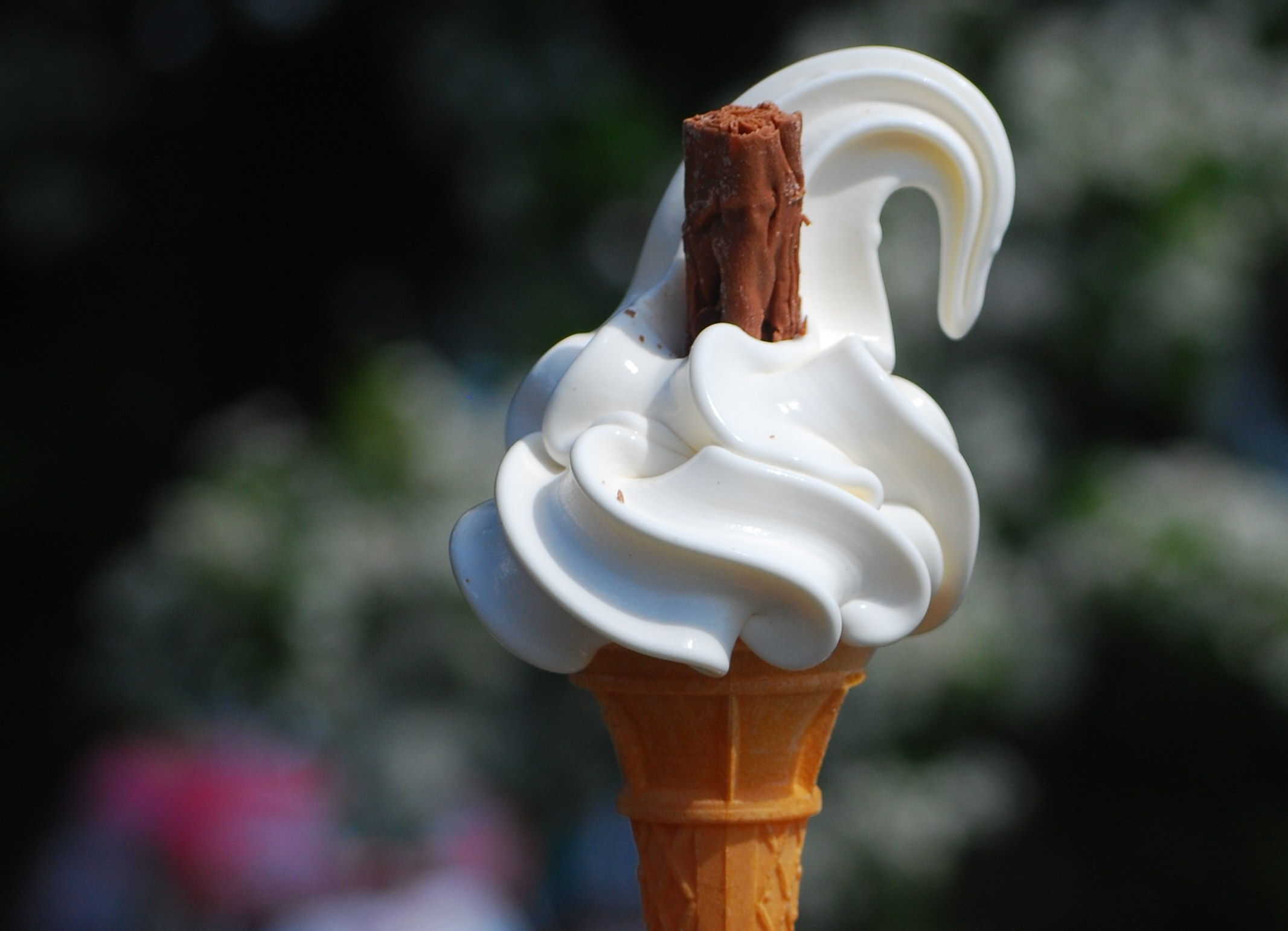
A 99 cone ice cream, served with its namesake Flake

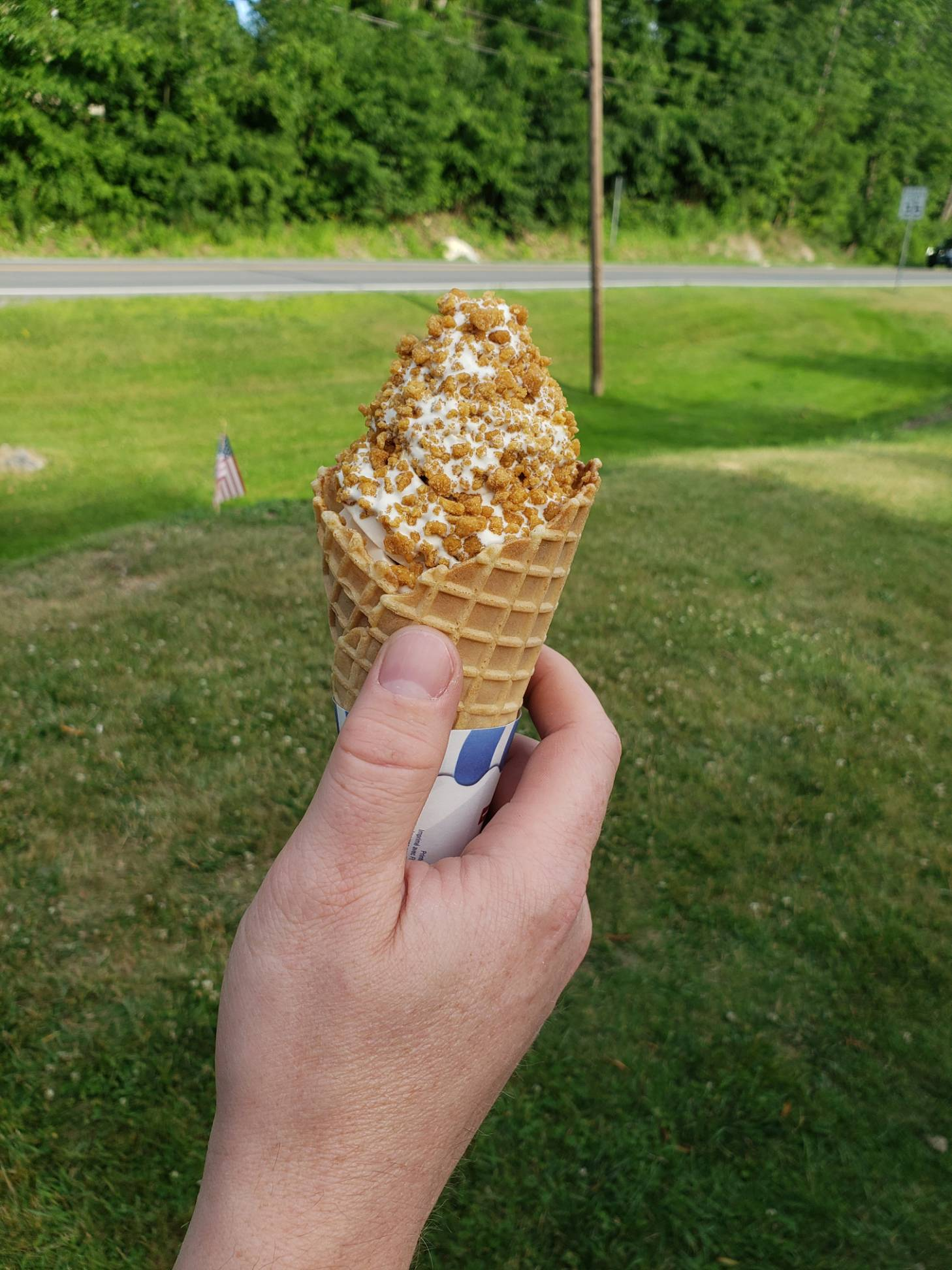
A maple Creemee served in a waffle cone with added maple sprinkles

- 99 or 99 Flake is a soft-serve ice cream served in a cone with a Cadbury's Flake.
- American ice cream (גלידה אמריקאית, ISO 259: Glīḏåh ʾÅmȩrīqåʾīṯ, ISO 259-3: Glida ʔameriqáˀit) is the term used in Israel.
- American ice cream (lody amerykańskie in Polish) is the term used in Poland for less aerated soft-serve ice cream (as opposed to lody włoskie); also known as świderki (gimlets) due to their shape.
- Cream ice cream (krémfagylalt) is the term sometimes used in Hungary.
- Creemee is a term popular in Vermont and other parts of northern New England. Term is derived from a defunct soft-serve maple product with a higher fat content than other producers and remains popular among Vermonters. Commonly made with maple syrup.
- Crème glacée molle is the term used in Quebec and, more broadly, French Canada.
- Hard serve is a term used in New England and elsewhere in the United States to distinguish conventional "hard" ice cream from soft serve.
- Italian ice cream (glace à l'italienne (France), lody włoskie (Poland)) are the terms used in France and Poland.
- Lucky cream (لاكي كريم in Arabic) is the term used in Syria.
- Machine ice cream (helado de maquina (Dominican Republic), inghetata la dozator (Romania), сладолед от машина (Bulgaria), παγωτό μηχανής (pagōtó mīchanís; Greece), gépifagyi (Hungary) is the term used in the Dominican Republic, Romania, Bulgaria, Greece and Hungary.
- Merry cream (ميري كريم in Arabic) is the term used in Lebanon.
- Mr. Whippy is the most popular brand of soft-serve ice cream in the United Kingdom and in Australia, and is commonly referred to as a 99 if a chocolate Flake is added (99 Flake), mainly when sold from an ice cream van.
- Softcream (ソフトクリーム, sofutokuriimu) is used to describe an analogous product in Japan, that can be either savory or sweet, with uniquely Asian flavors such as powdered tea, wasabi, sesame, ume or plum, rose, kabocha or Japanese pumpkin, peach, and grape, among others.
- Pehmis, short for pehmytjäätelö (soft ice cream) is a genericized trademark of Nestlé used in Finland.
- Semi-frozen (semi-frio) is the term used in Portugal.
- Soft ice, or Softeis (Germany), softijs (Netherlands and Flanders), or softis (Norway and Iceland), is the term used in Norway, Iceland, Germany, Denmark, the Netherlands, Belgium, and several other places in Europe.
- Soft ice cream (mjukglass) is the term used in Sweden. Soft ice cream is the term generally used in Canada for the finished product although soft serve is sometimes used. Similarly, gelat tou is the term used in Andorra and Catalonia (Spain). Also in Greater China, Chinese: 软冰淇淋; pinyin: ruǎn bīngqílín), Cantonese: 軟雪糕; Jyutping: jyun^{5} syut^{8} gou^{1} and Chinese: 霜淇淋; pinyin: shuāngqílín are the terms used in Mainland China, Hong Kong, and Taiwan respectively.
- Soft whip is the term used in Ireland. When served in a cone with chocolate Flake, it is commonly referred to as a 99.
- Softee or softie is the term used in India, Pakistan, and Australia; in the latter, softees were popularized by desserts company Frosty Boy.
- Ice cream Softserve or a more common term I-Tim (ไอศครีม ซอฟเสริฟ or ไอติม in Thai) are the terms used in Thailand.

== Gallery ==
=== Soft serve in a cup ===
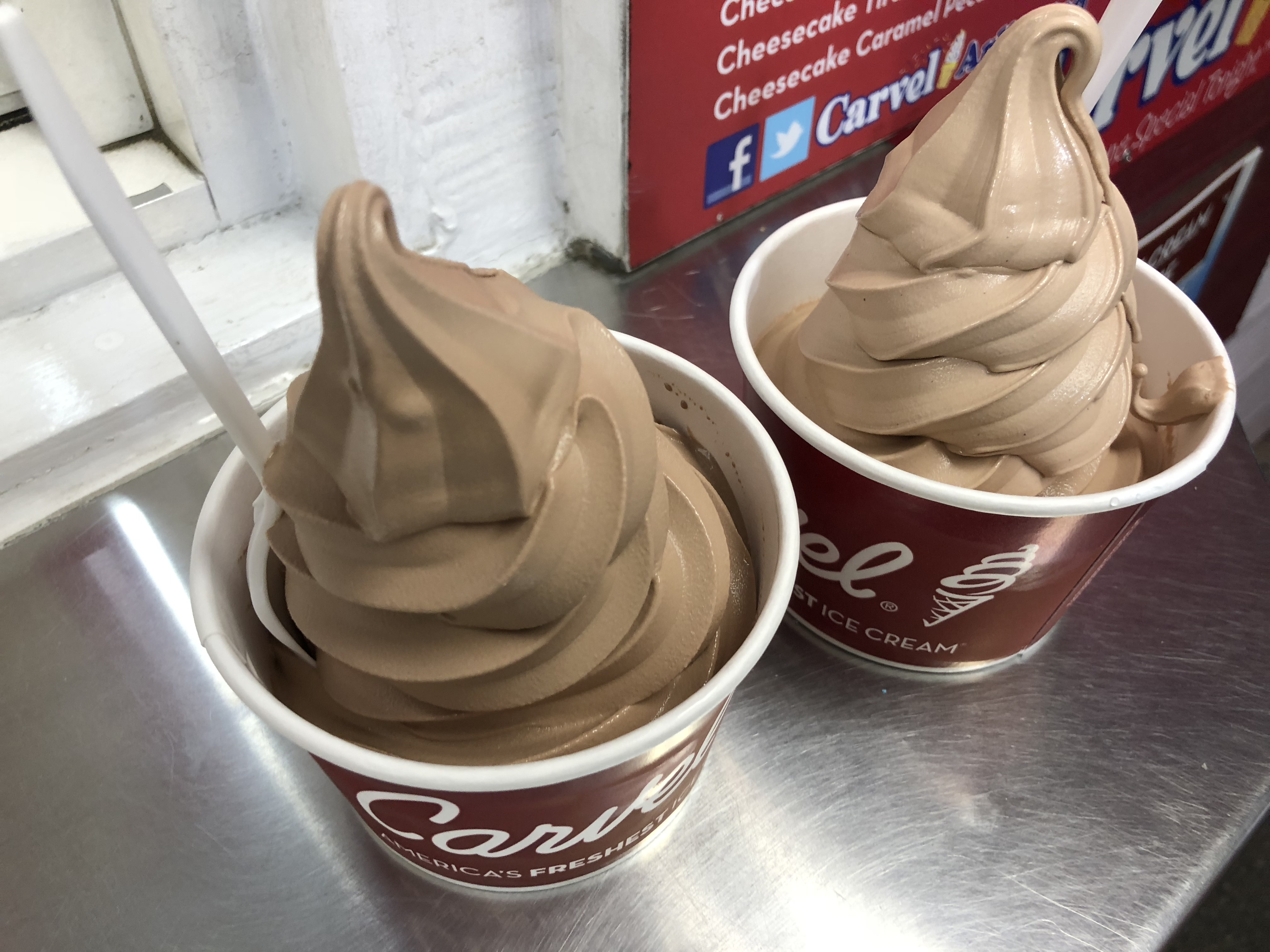

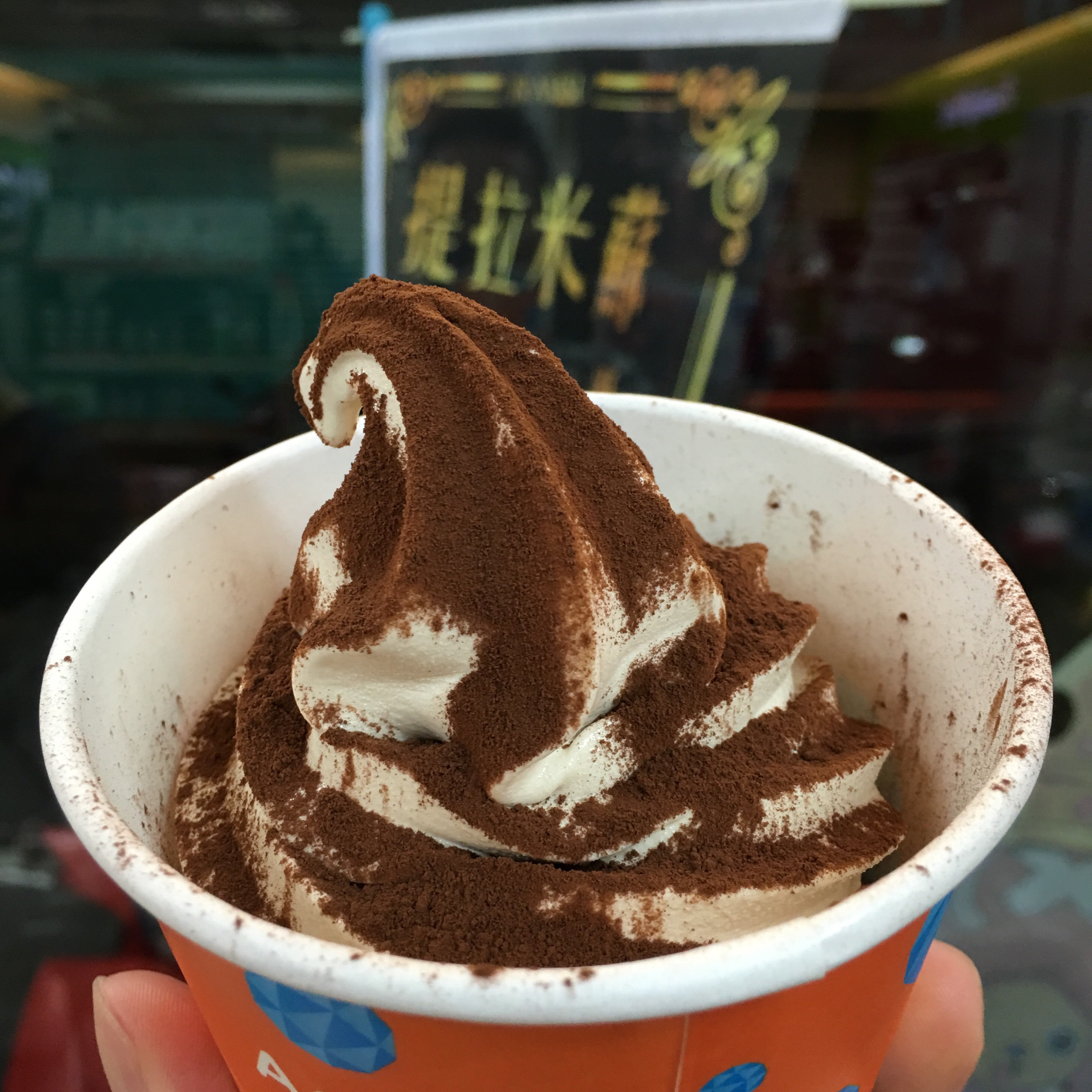

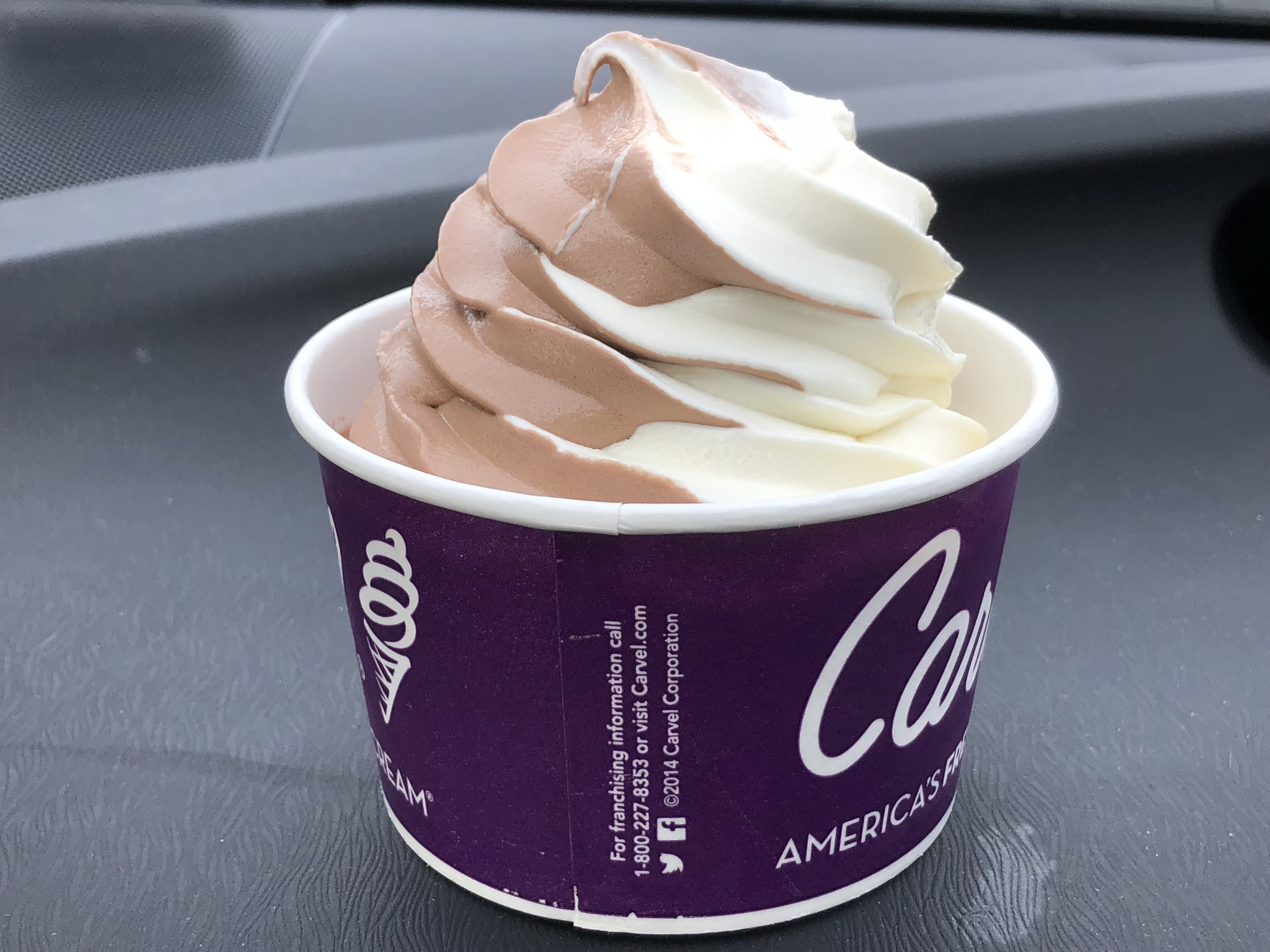

=== Soft serve in an ice cream cone ===
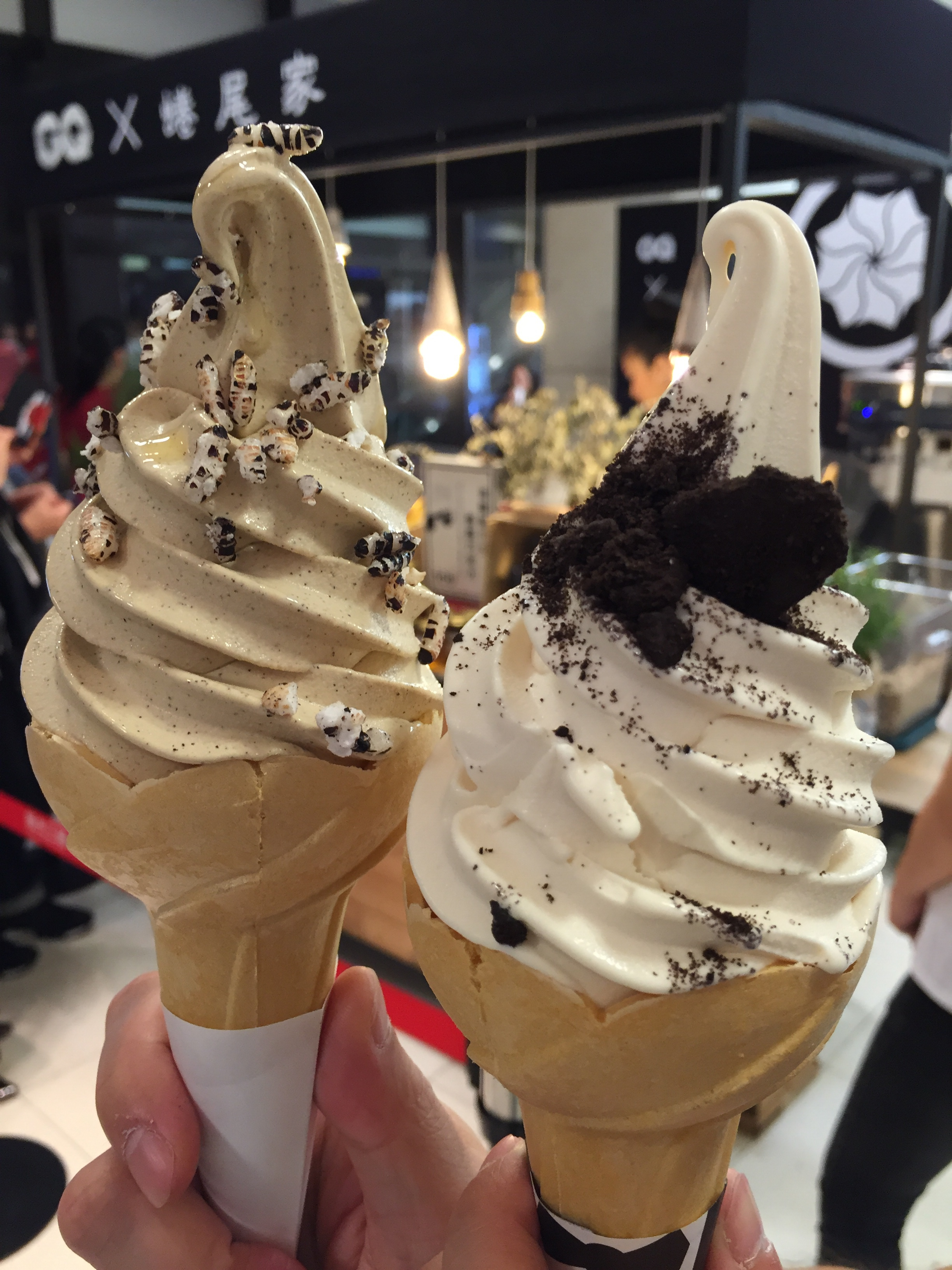

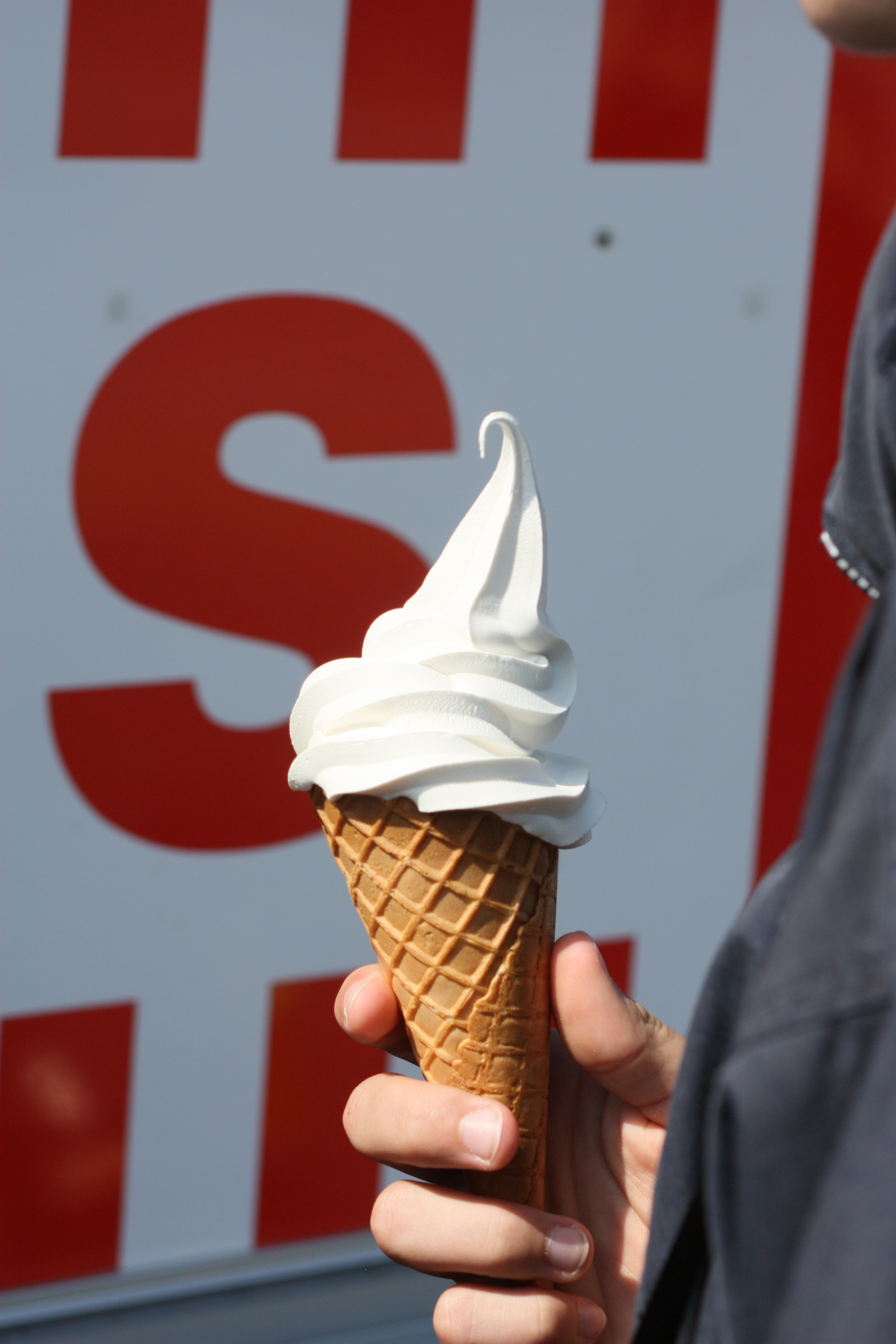

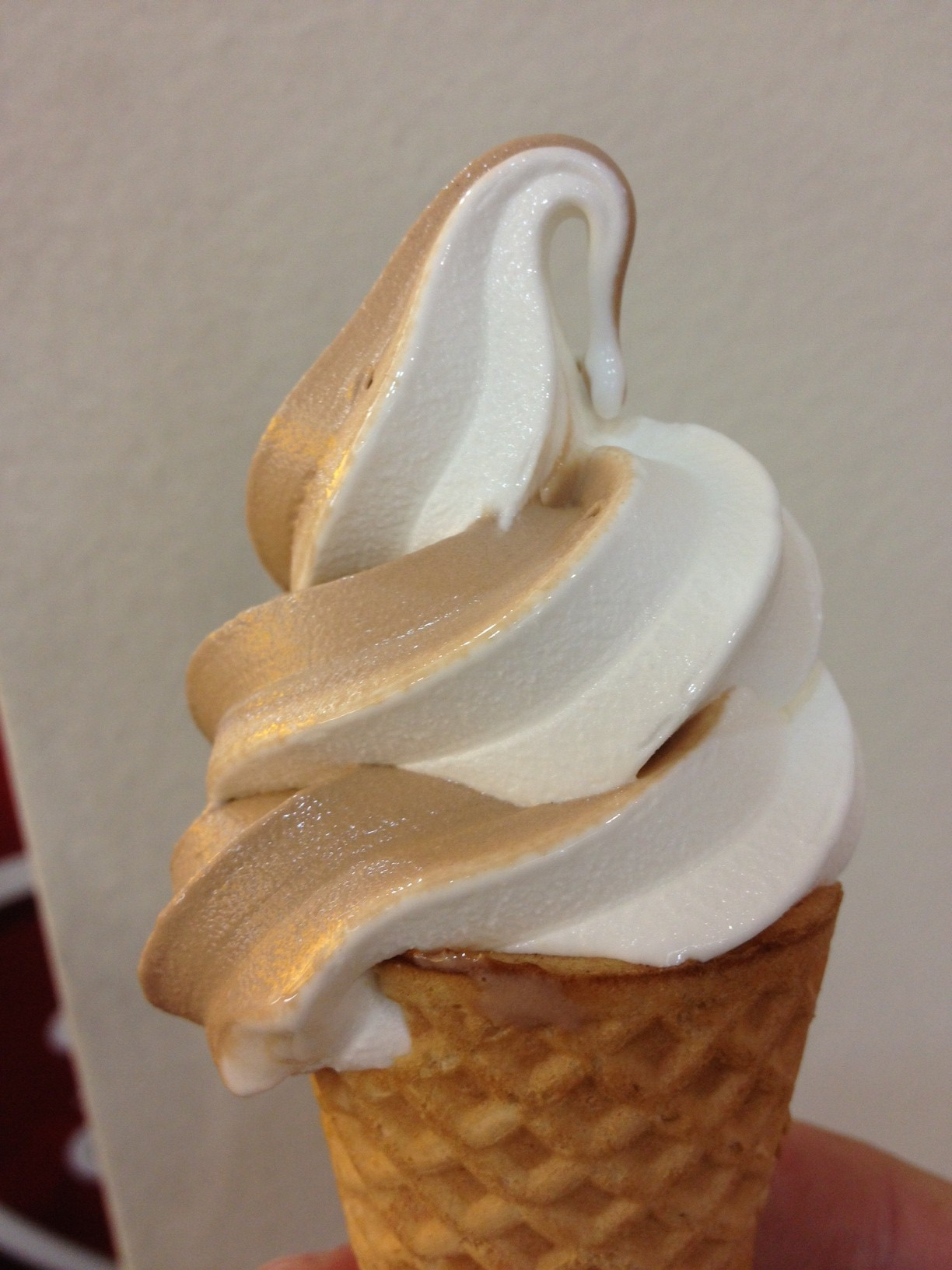

=== Soft-serve machine ===
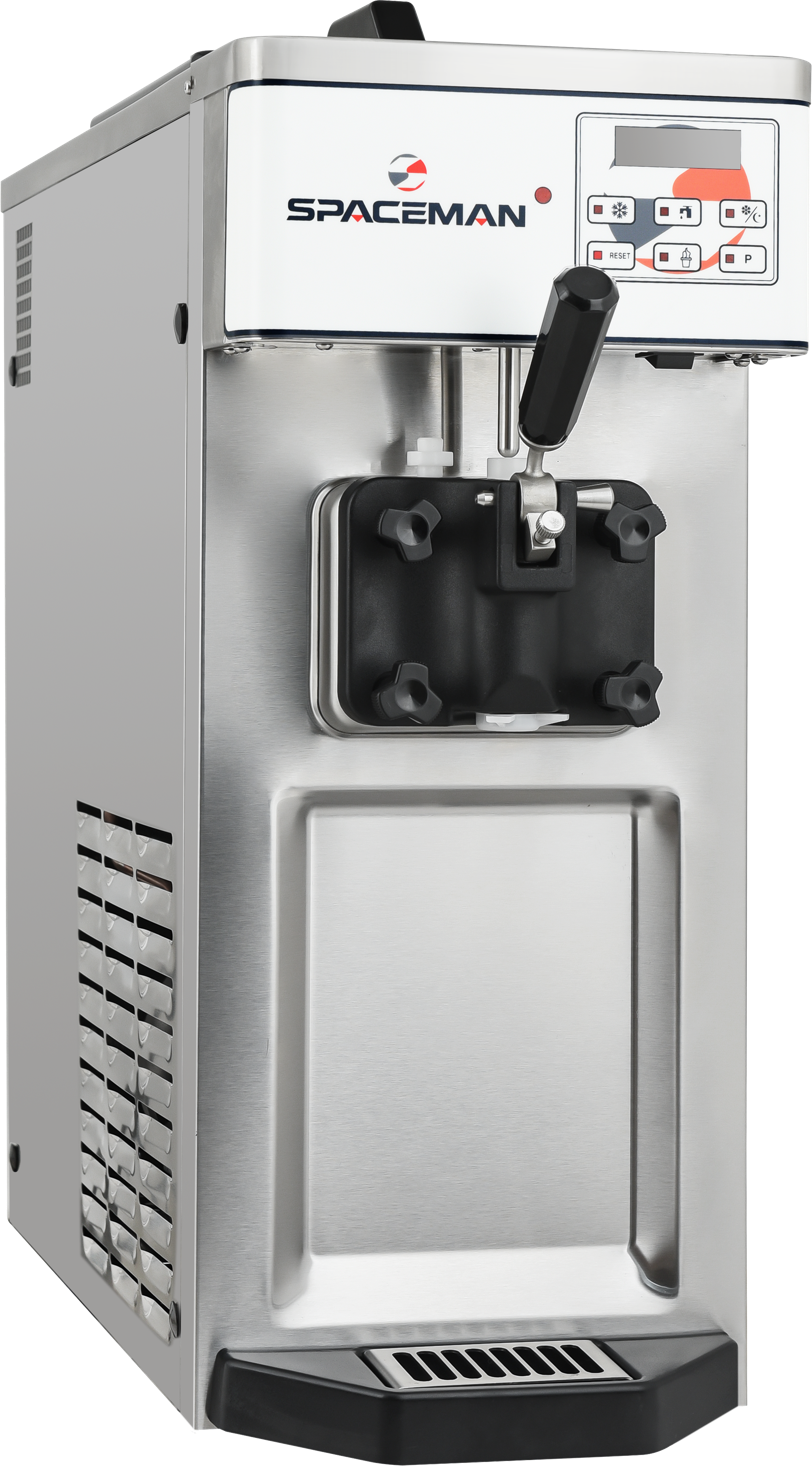

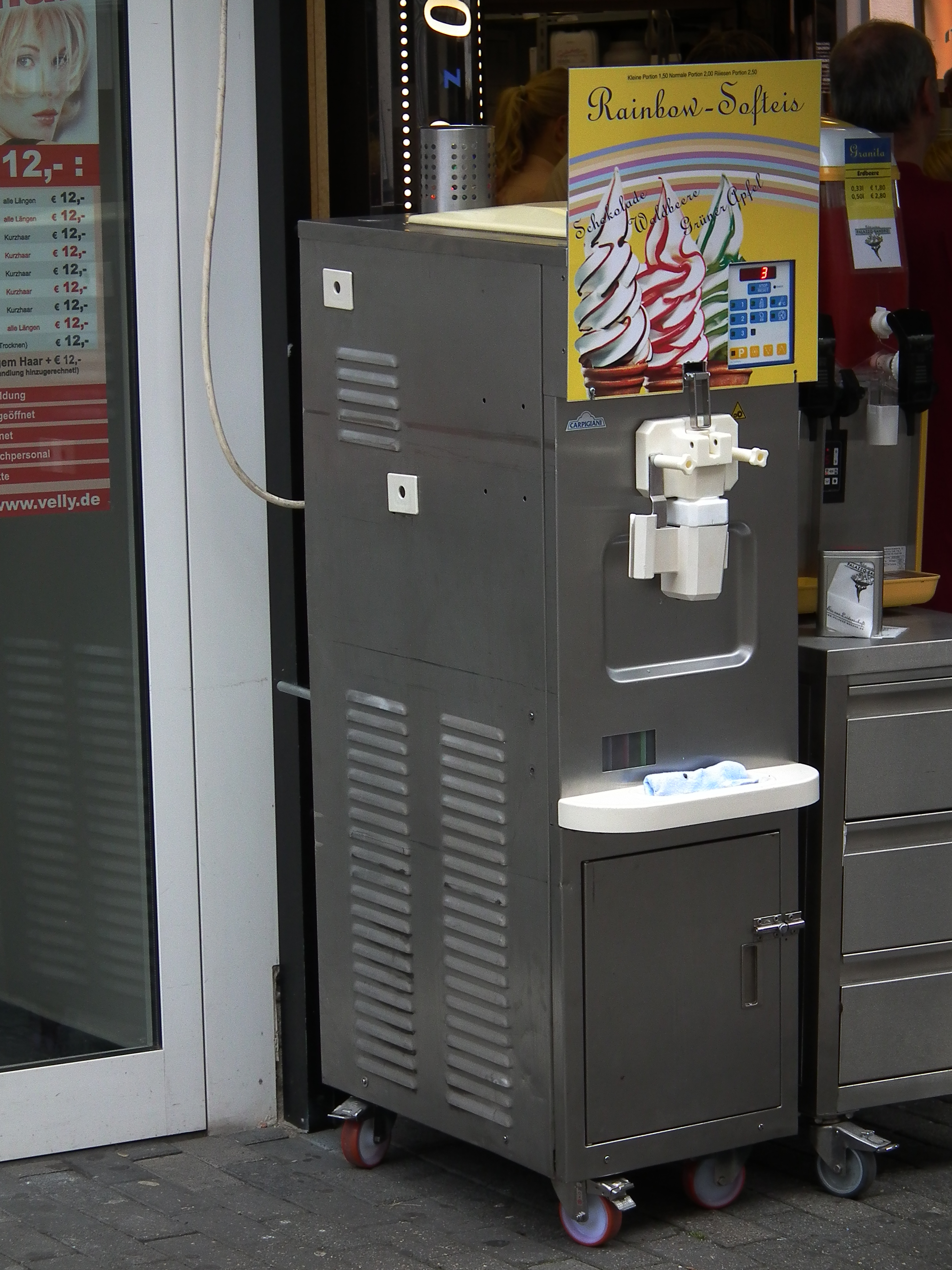

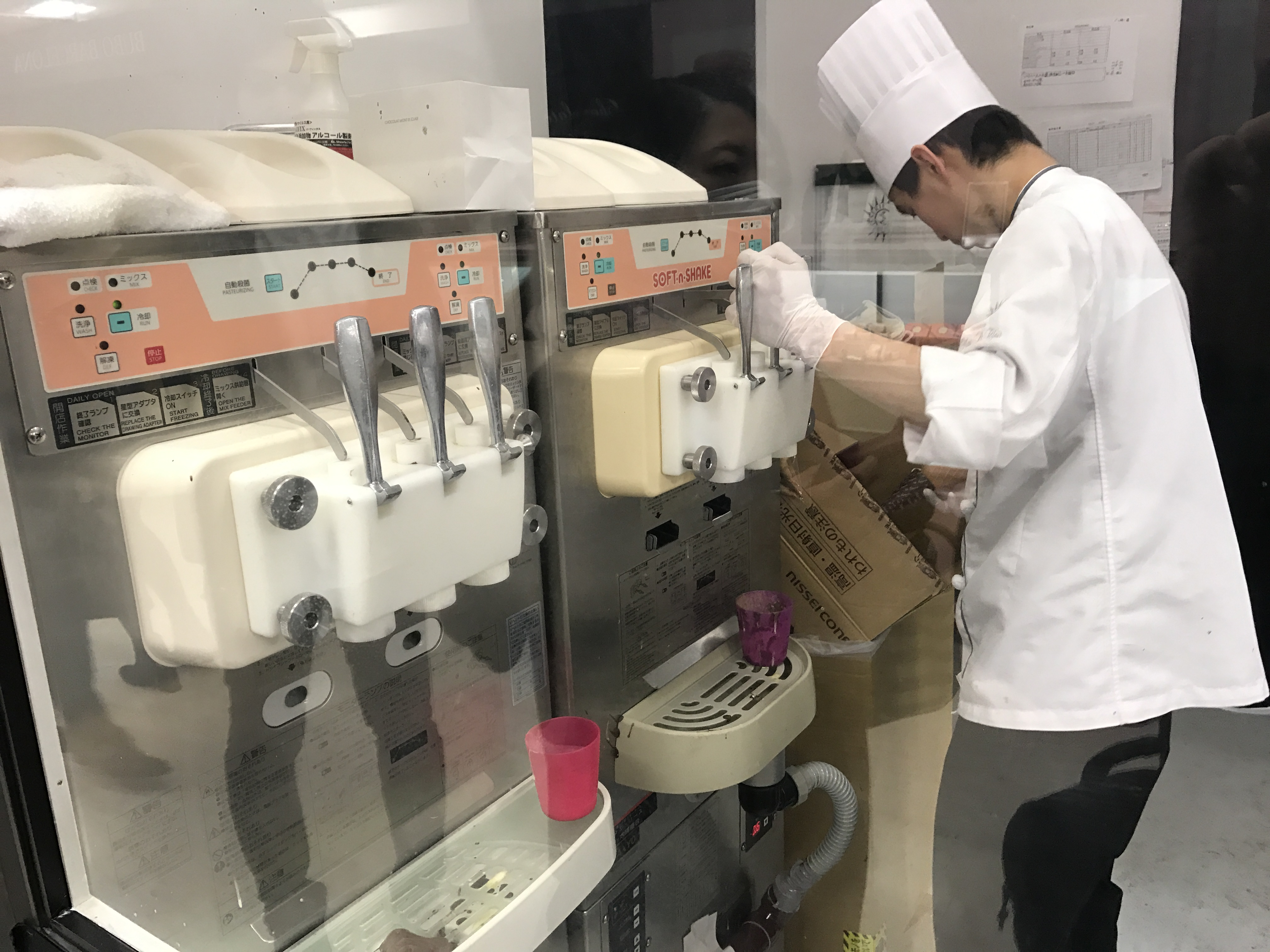

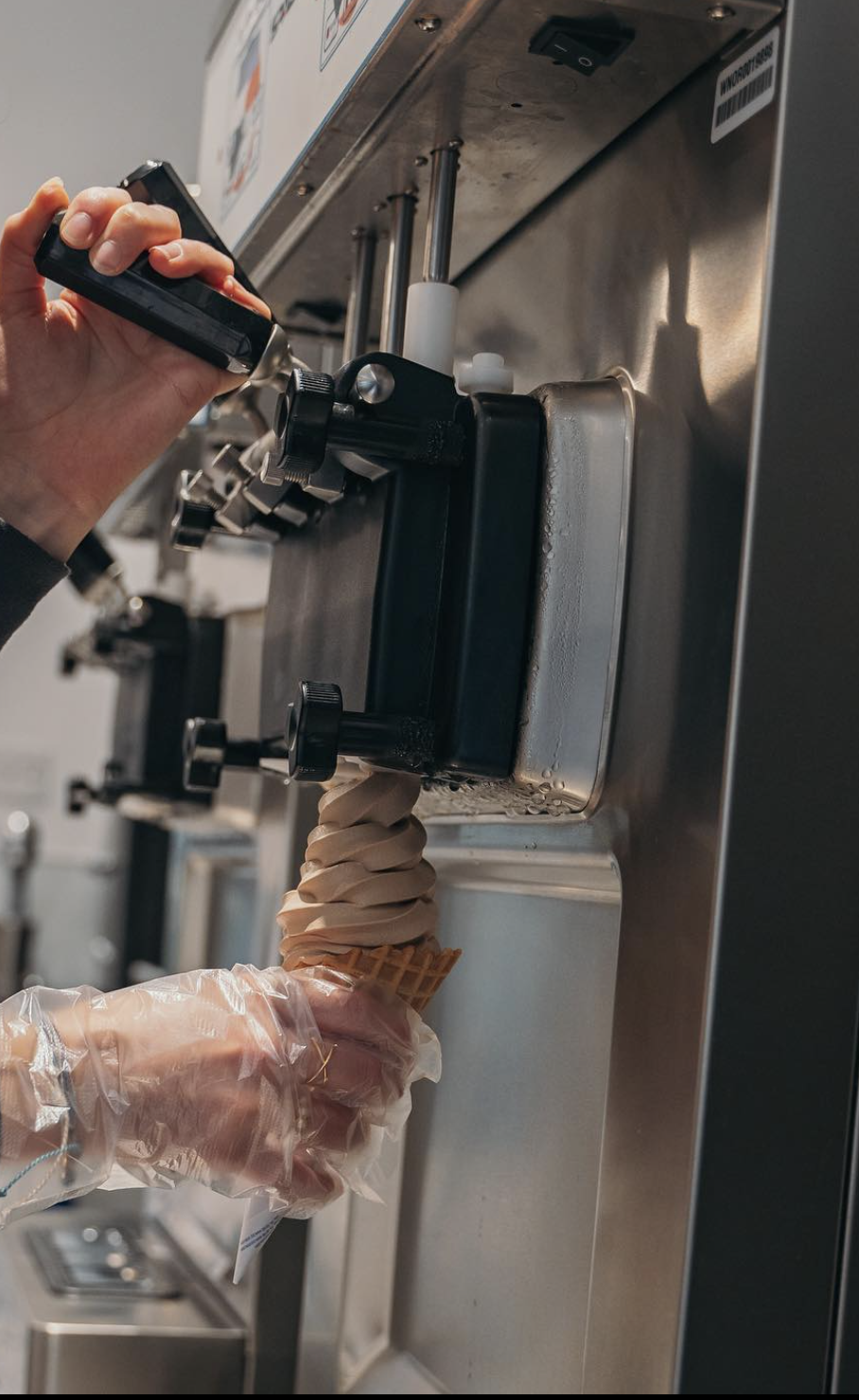

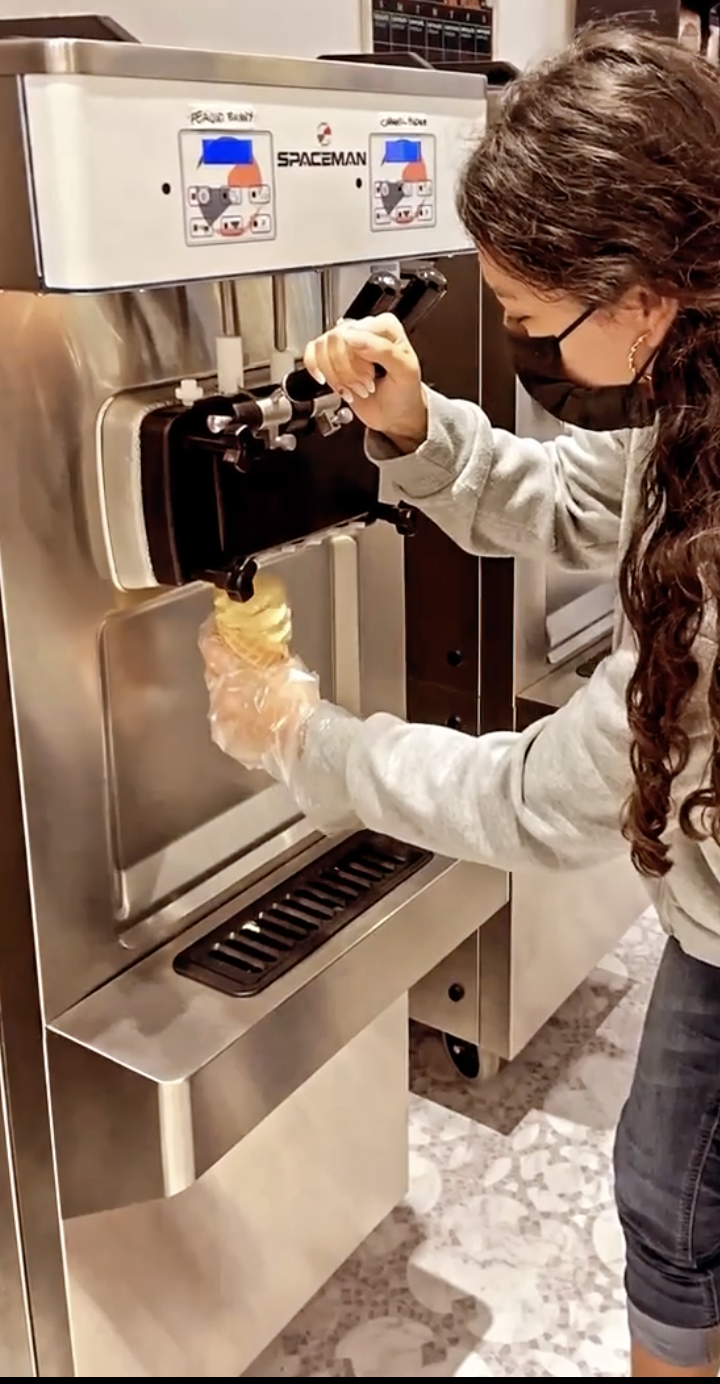

== See also ==
- Frozen custard, a style of egg- and cream-based frozen dessert, often served similarly to soft-serve
- Frozen yogurt, a cultured frozen milk product that may have a naturally tart flavour
- Ice cream stand
- Ice cream van
- Ice milk, a frozen dessert containing less than 10 percent milkfat
