= Cadbury chocolate factory, Toronto =

Factory in Toronto, Canada

Coordinates: 43°39′5″N 79°25′47″W

Cadbury chocolate factory
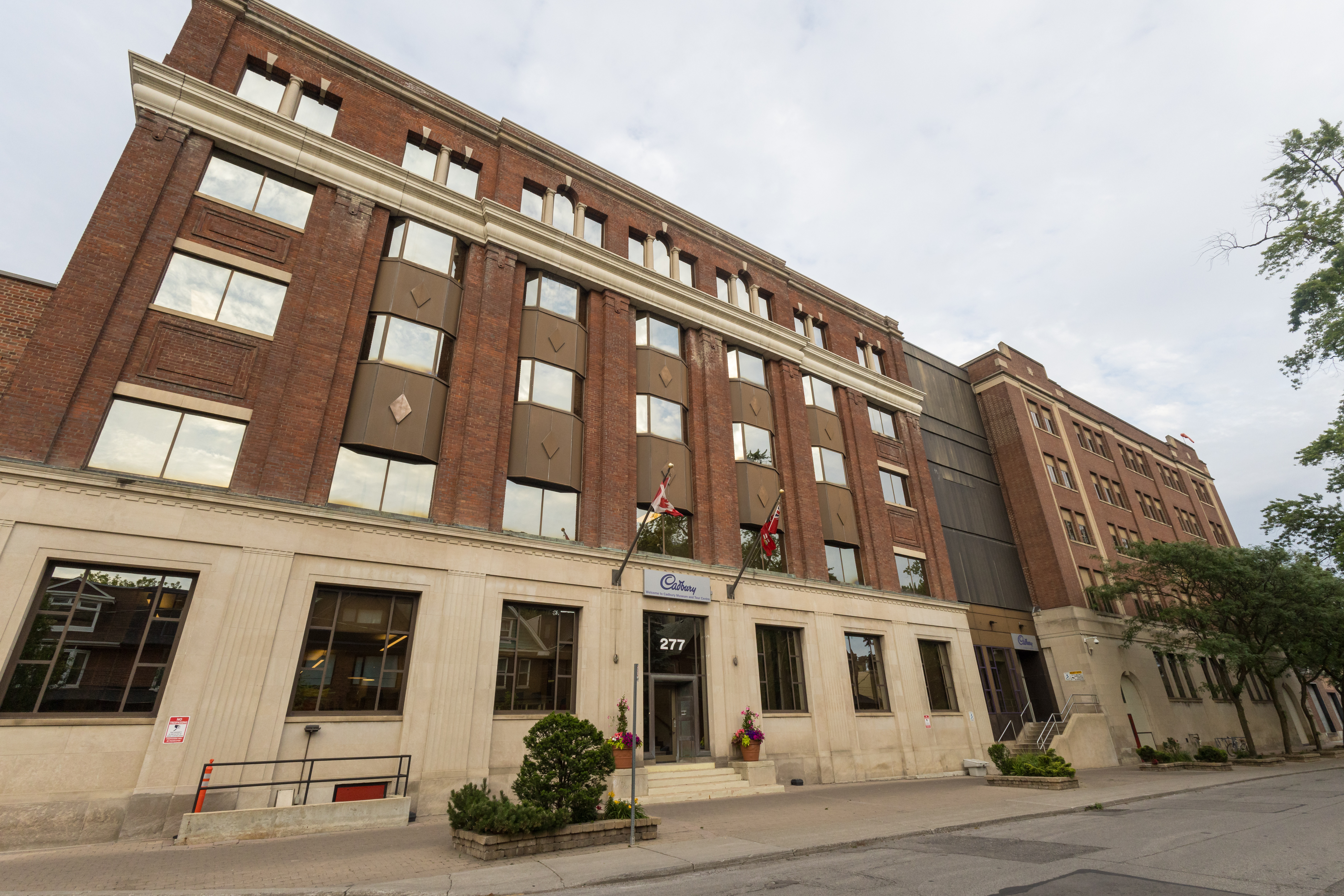
- Facade of the factory in 2026
- Operated: 1906; 120 years ago
- Location: 277 Gladstone Avenue
- Industry: Chocolate
- Products: Chocolate confectionery
- Owner: Cadbury

The Cadbury chocolate factory is a five-storey building located on Gladstone Avenue in Toronto. It was constructed by William Neilson in 1906 and produces all Cadbury's products sold in Canada.

== Location and building ==
The five-storey factory is located at 277 Gladstone Avenue, in the Little Portugal neighbourhood of Toronto. The building is on an otherwise fully residential street.

== History and ownership ==
The factory was constructed and opened in 1906 by William Neilson of William Neilson Limited. It was purchased in 1996 by Cadbury. As of 2014, it is owned by Cadbury's parent company Mondelez International.

Ed Pizale was the factory manager in 2010, Dave Heaven managed the factory in October 2014.

The factory received a $37 million renovation in 2019.

== Activities ==
The cooking processes in the factory are all completely automated. The factory manufactures 500 million chocolate bars per year, producing every Cadbury product sold in Canada. Products made include Crunchie, Wunderbar, Mr. Big, Caramilk, Mini Eggs, Dairy Milk, Cream Egg, and Crispy Crunch.

In 2010, the factory employed 400 staff.

== See also ==
- Cadbury's Chocolate Factory, Tasmania
- Cadbury Ireland
- Cadbury World
