= Cadbury World =

Visitor attraction in Birmingham, England and Dunedin, New Zealand

Coordinates: 52°25′45.64″N 1°55′56.23″W

- Established: 1990
- Location: Bournville, Birmingham, West Midlands, England
- Owner: Mondelez International (Operated by Merlin Entertainments)
- Website: www.cadburyworld.co.uk

Cadbury World is a visitor attraction in Bournville, Birmingham, England, featuring a self-guided exhibition tour, created and run by the Cadbury Company. The tour tells the history of chocolate, and of the Cadbury business.

A second location in Dunedin, New Zealand, closed in May 2018.

== Birmingham ==
=== Overview ===
Cadbury's planning for a new chocolate-based attraction started in 1988, with the Bournville site decided upon. Cadbury World was opened on 14 August 1990 by Morgan Anderson on Cadbury's Bournville manufacturing site at a cost of £6 million. The attraction has expanded and developed its content through 'continuous improvement'. It was formally opened by then Prime Minister John Major on 12 April 1991.

Cadbury World has gone on to become one of Birmingham's largest leisure attractions. Over 500,000 people visit there each year, especially children and students. The estate has an education programme, linking back to the educational advancements and interests of the company's original founders.

Whilst not a factory tour, Cadbury World offers its visitors the opportunity to explore and discover chocolate's history, and to learn about the origins and story of the Cadbury business, which is now part of Mondelez, the world's second largest confectionery manufacturer.

In 2022, it was announced that Merlin Entertainments were to take over the running of the attraction, subject to the approval of the Competition and Markets Authority.

=== Fourteen Zones ===
Cadbury World features 14 zones which tell the story of chocolate and the Cadbury business through various static sets, animatronics, video presentations, multi-sensory cinema, interactive displays and activities, and staff demonstrations.

In August 2019, Heritage Interactive installed seven interactive panels in the Aztec Jungle. These zones also include "The Bournville Experience" (Opened in 2007 replacing the Cadbury Collection Museum), which explains the background to the development of the site on which it is located and "4D Chocolate Adventure", constructed in 2014 and replacing "Essence" which in turn replaced "Cadburyland" before it, and which incorporates a 3D cinema.

== Dunedin ==
In July 2003 another Cadbury World was opened in Dunedin, New Zealand, located in the Cadbury Factory site at 280 Cumberland St, close to the city centre near the Octagon. Unlike the Cadbury World in Birmingham, it offered guided tours around the manufacturing area of the factory.

In 2018, the factory closed. Despite plans to keep it open, Cadbury World was also closed that year, to make way for a new NZ$1.4 billion hospital to replace the existing Dunedin Hospital. Mondelez vice-president Banfield confirmed that the former Cadbury site had been sold to the Ministry of Health for an undisclosed amount. It was reported that the closure of Cadbury World would lead to the loss of 39 jobs. During the demolition, business records from Hudson & Co from 1899 to 1988 were discovered in a cupboard. Hudson & Co amalgamated with Cadbury Fry in 1929.

Images from Cadbury World at Bournville (UK) and Dunedin (NZ)
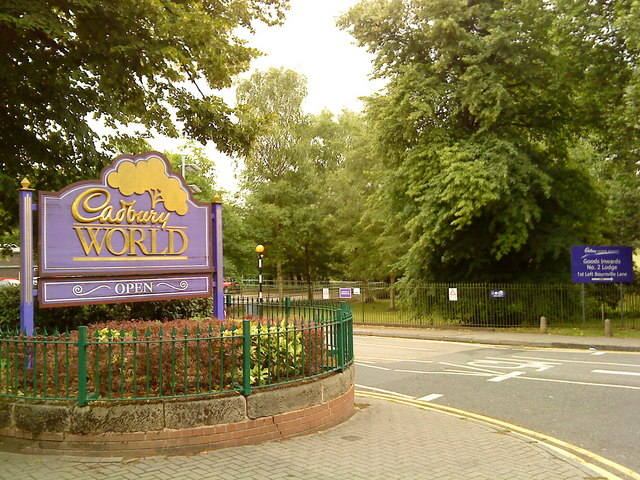
Sign to Cadbury World, Bournville

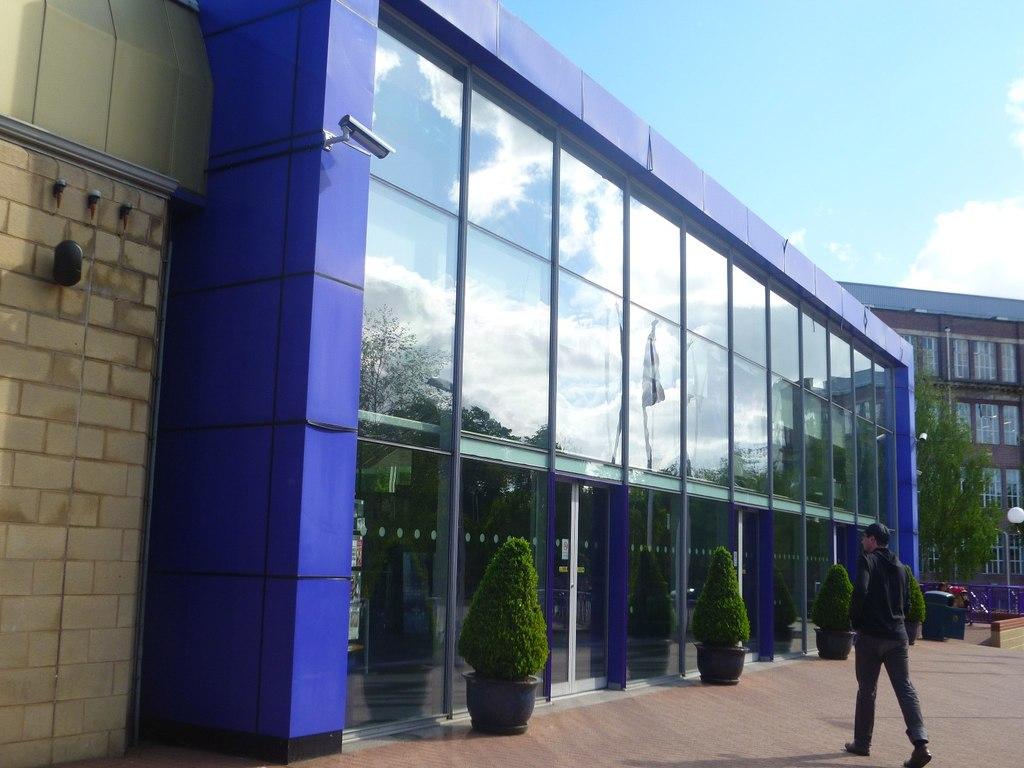
Main entrance to Cadbury World, Bournville

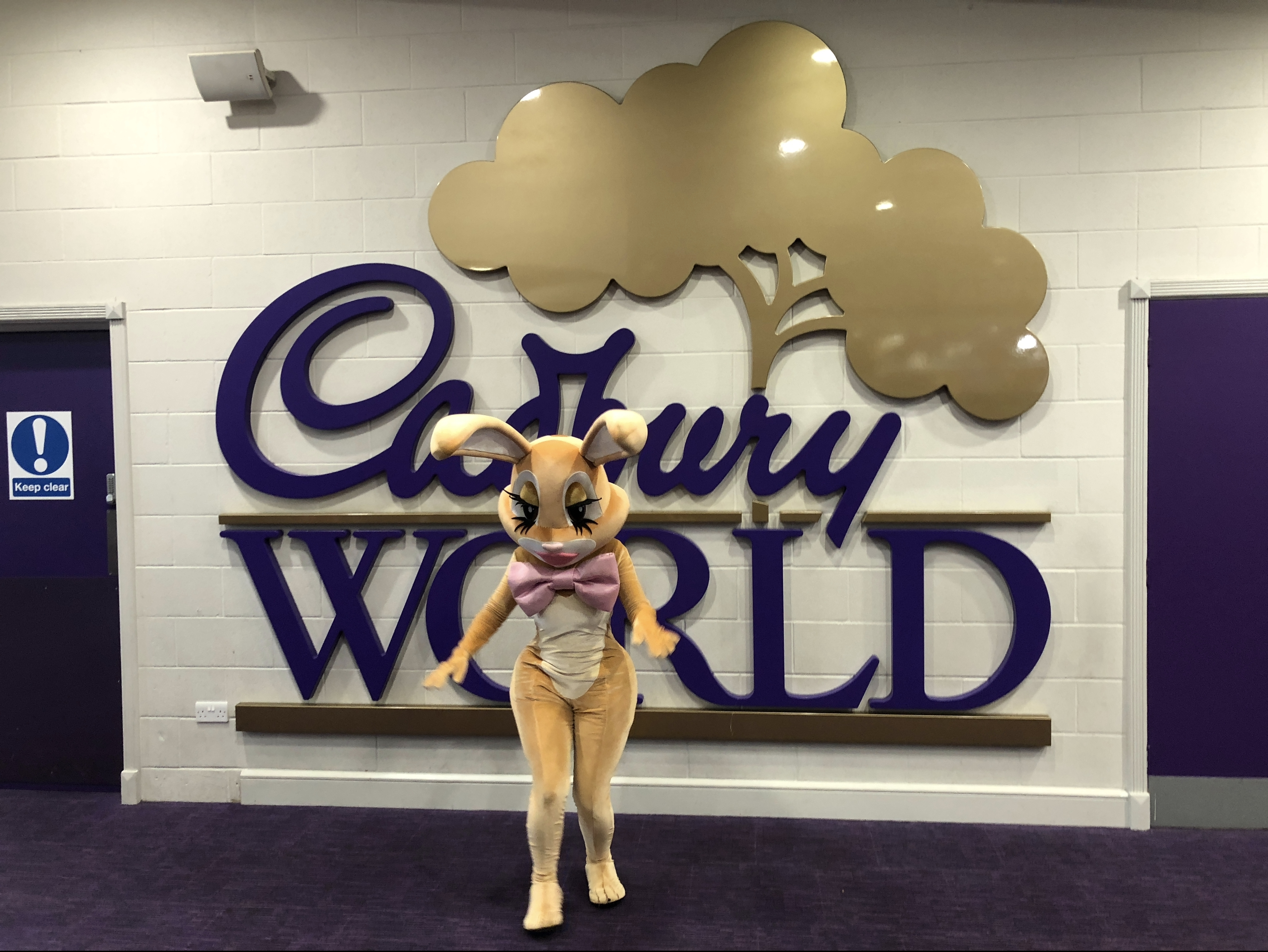
The Cadbury Bunny in the ticket hall, Bournville

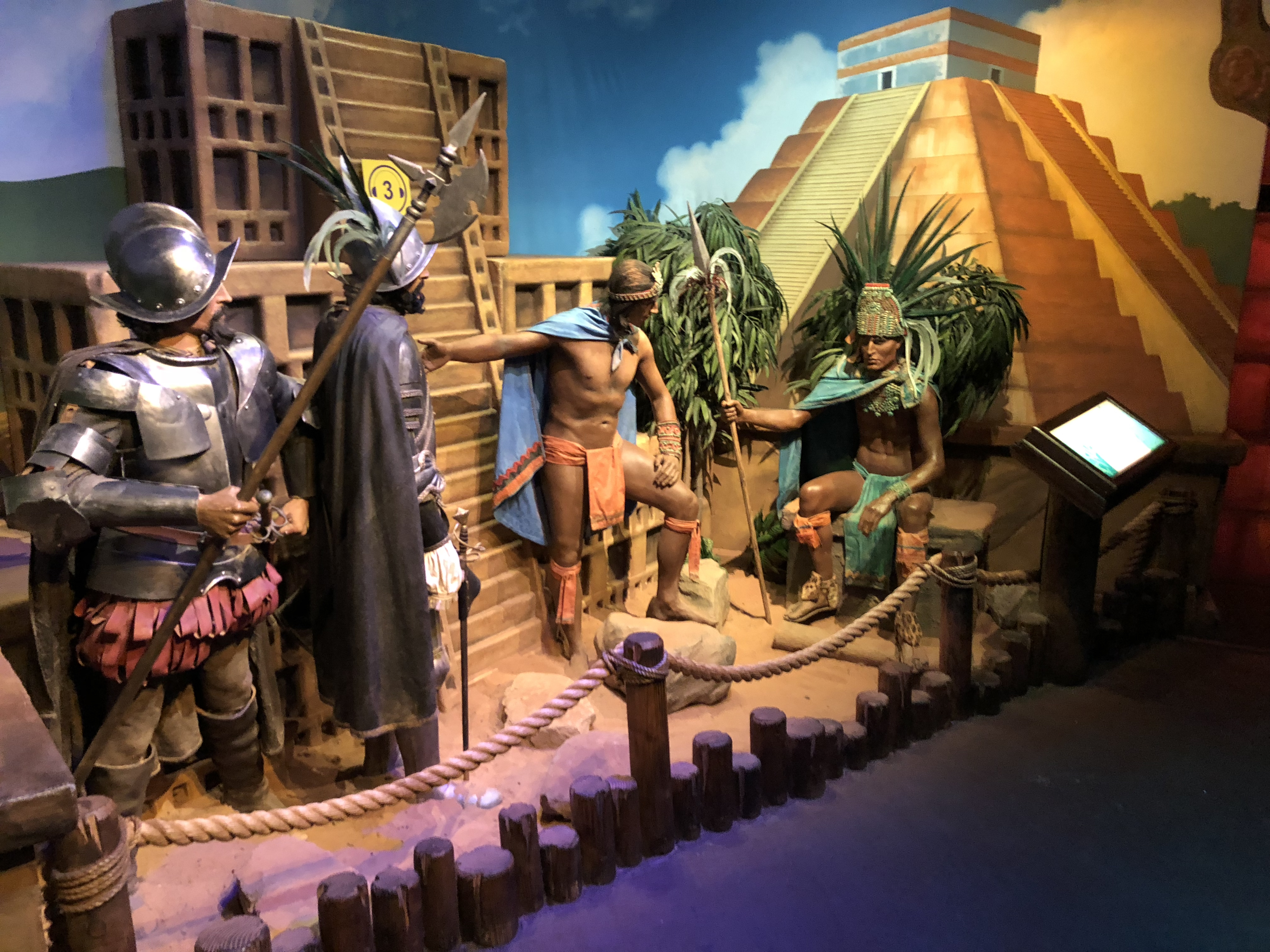
Aztec Jungle, Bournville

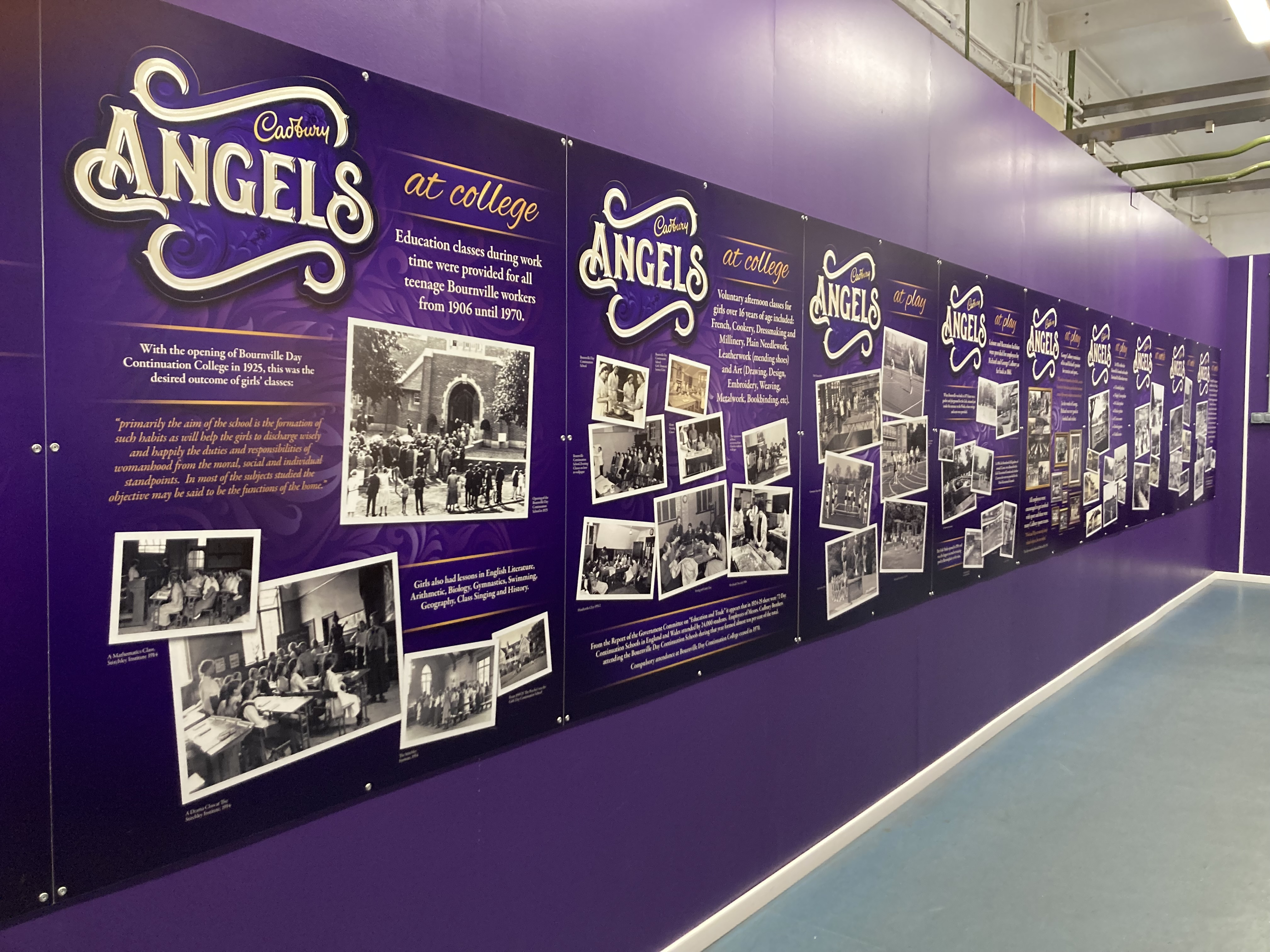
Cadbury Angels, Bournville

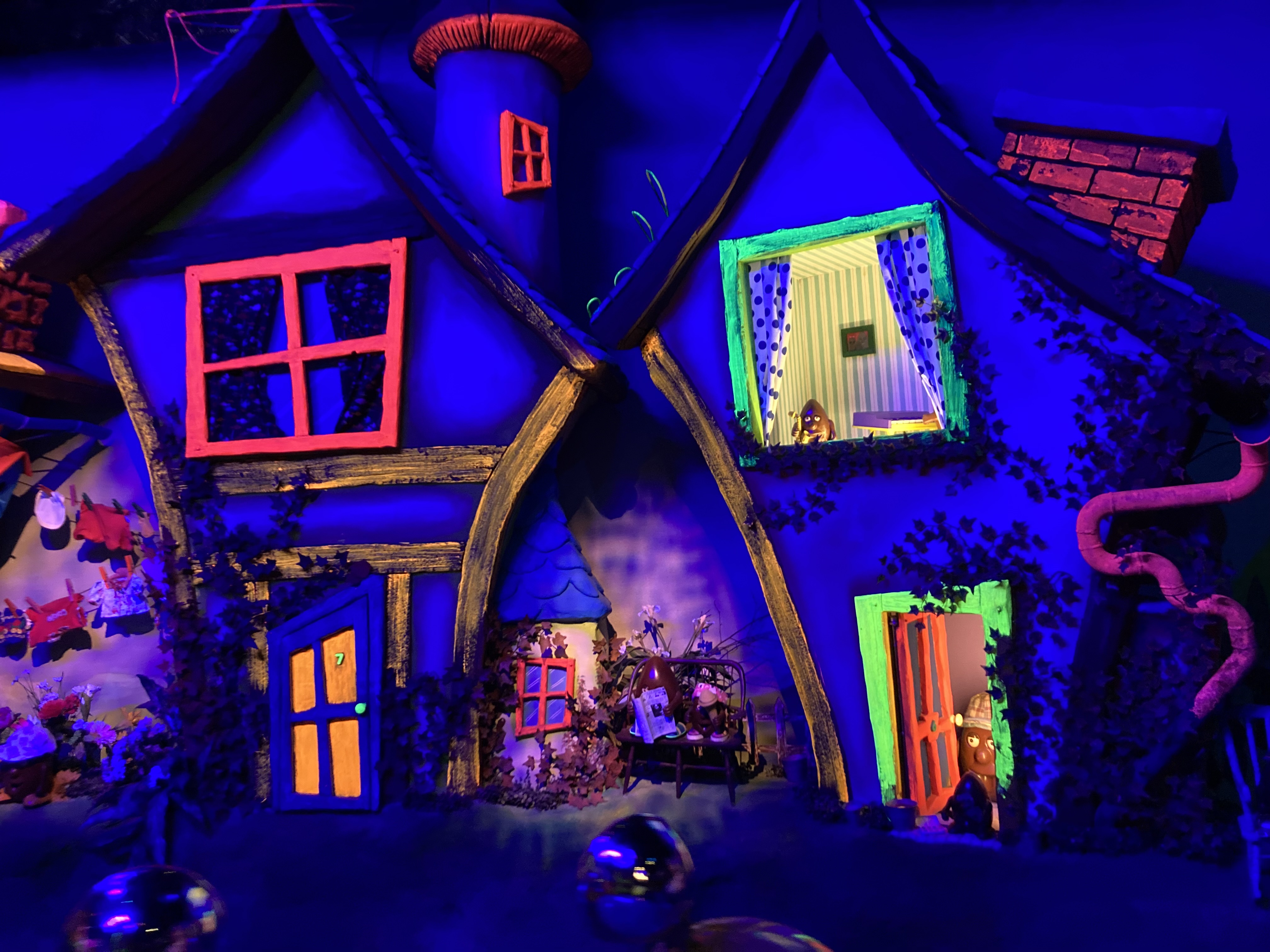
The Cadabra ride, Bournville

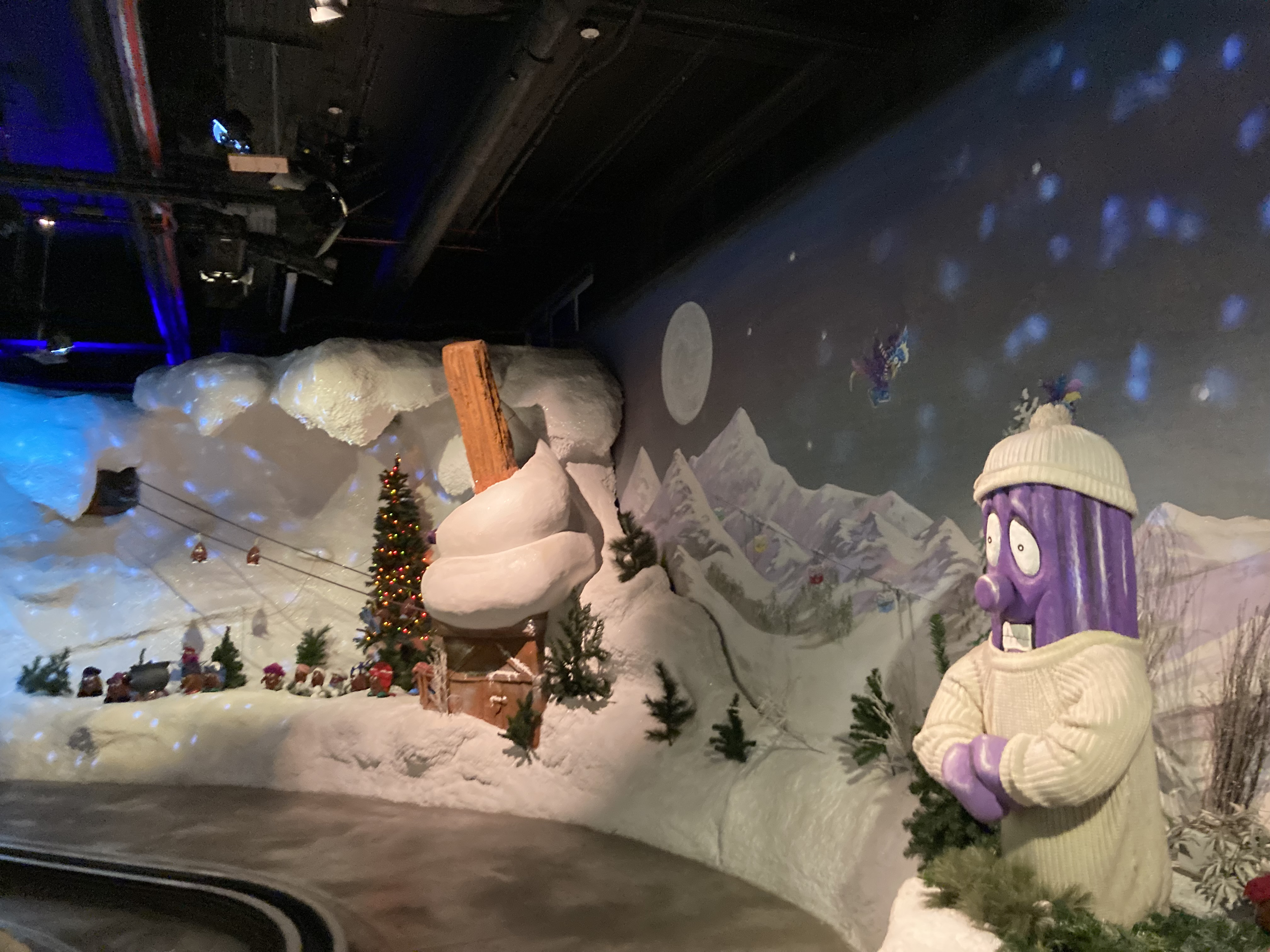
The Cadabra ride, Bournville

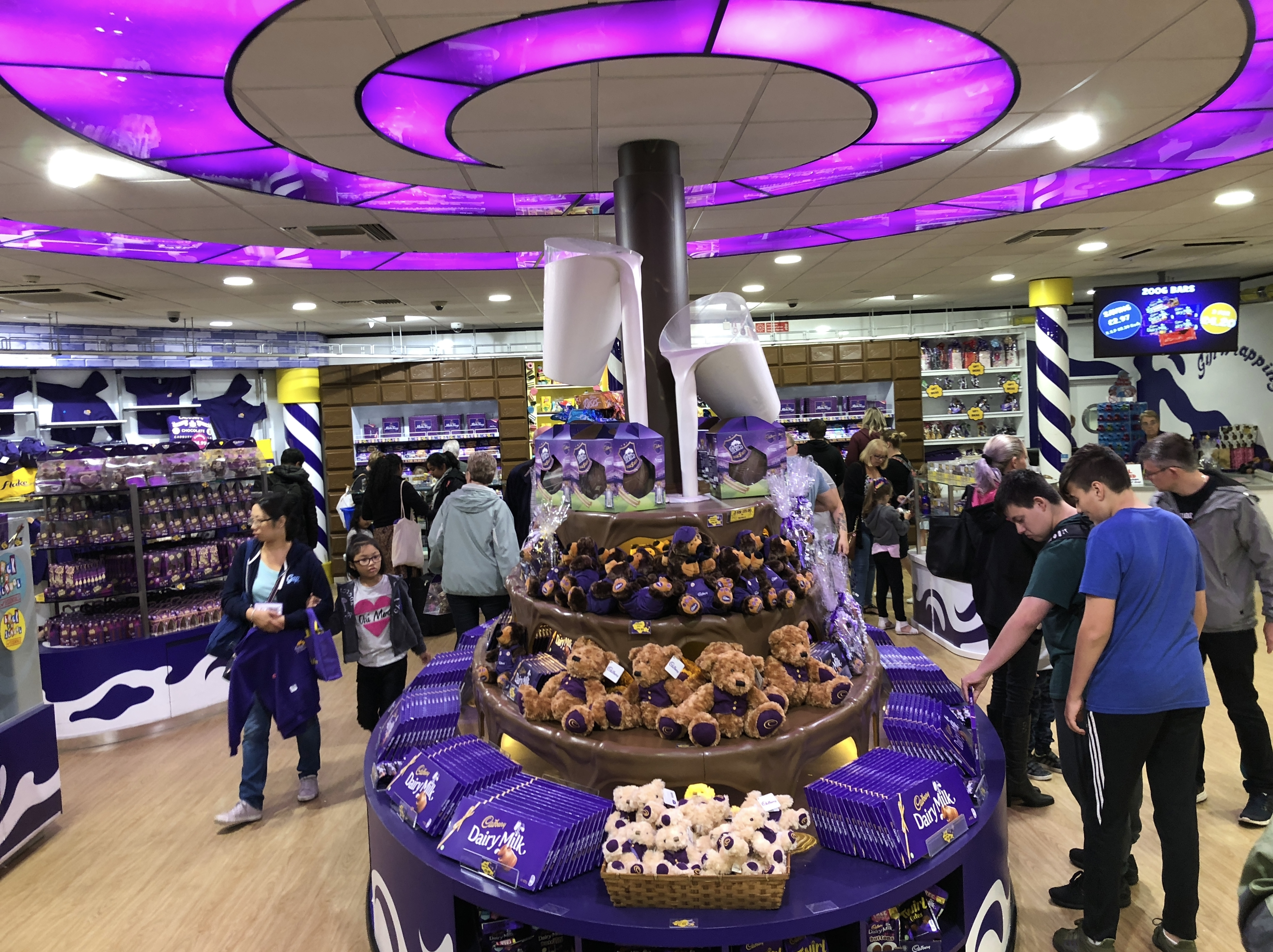
Cadbury World shop, Bournville

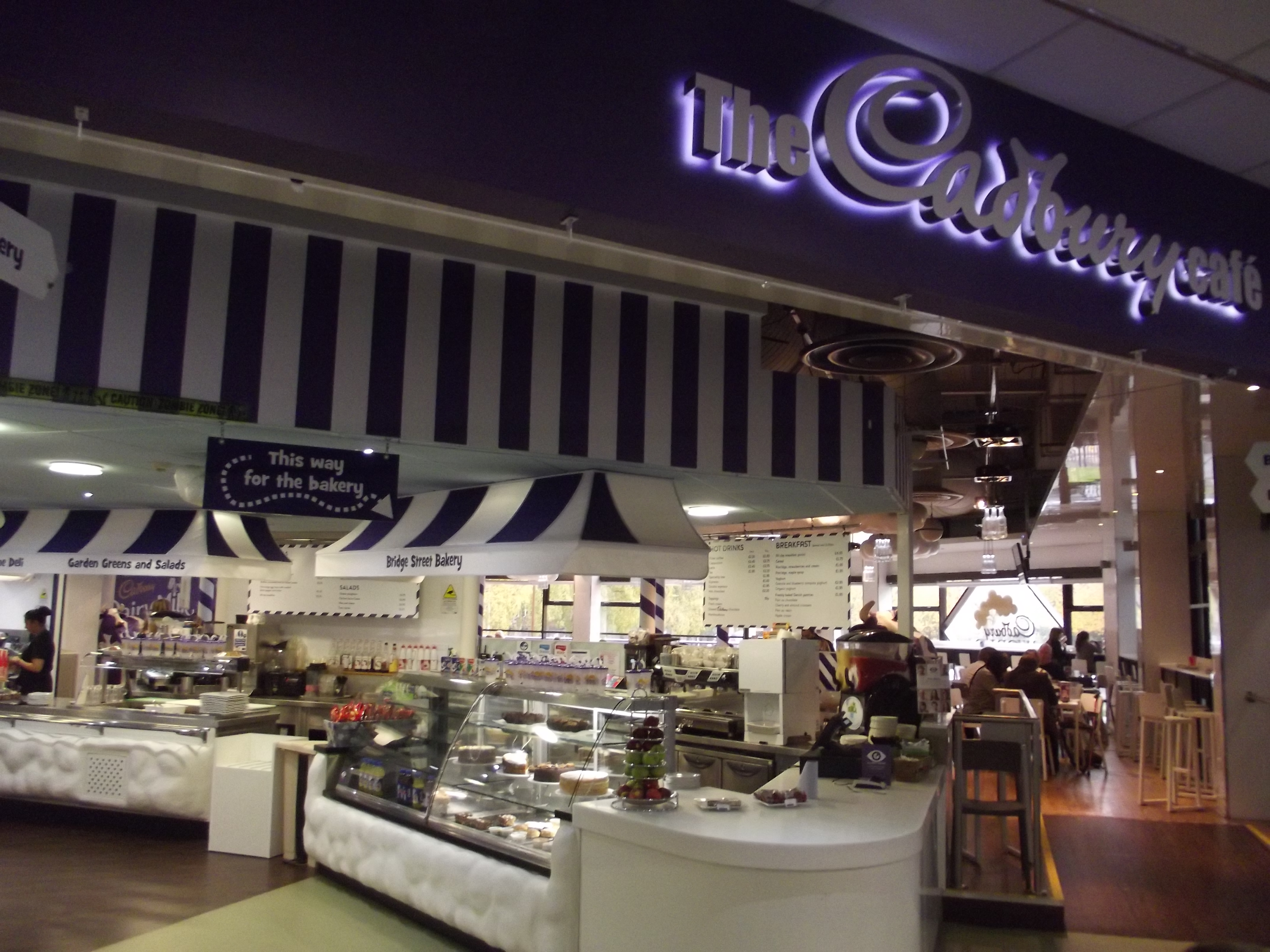
The Cadbury Cafe, Bournville

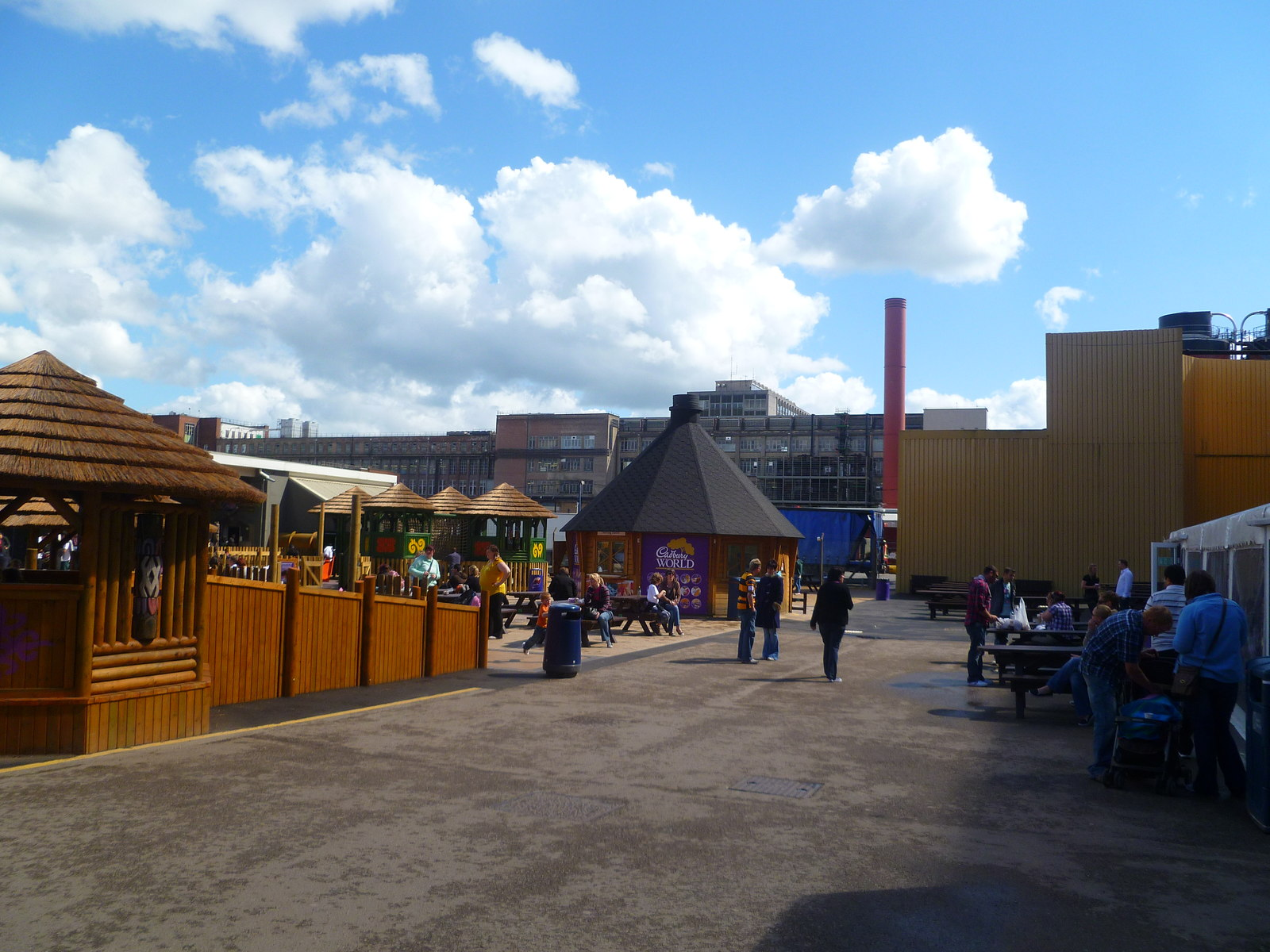
African Adventure Play Area and 4D Chocolate Adventure, Bournville

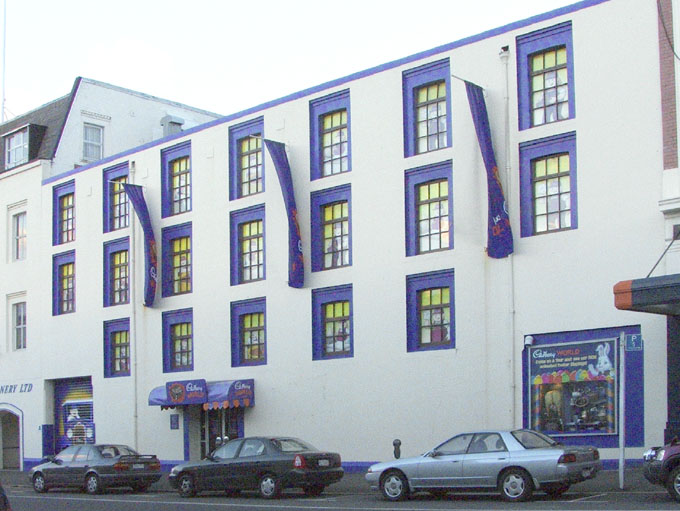
The former Cadbury World, Dunedin

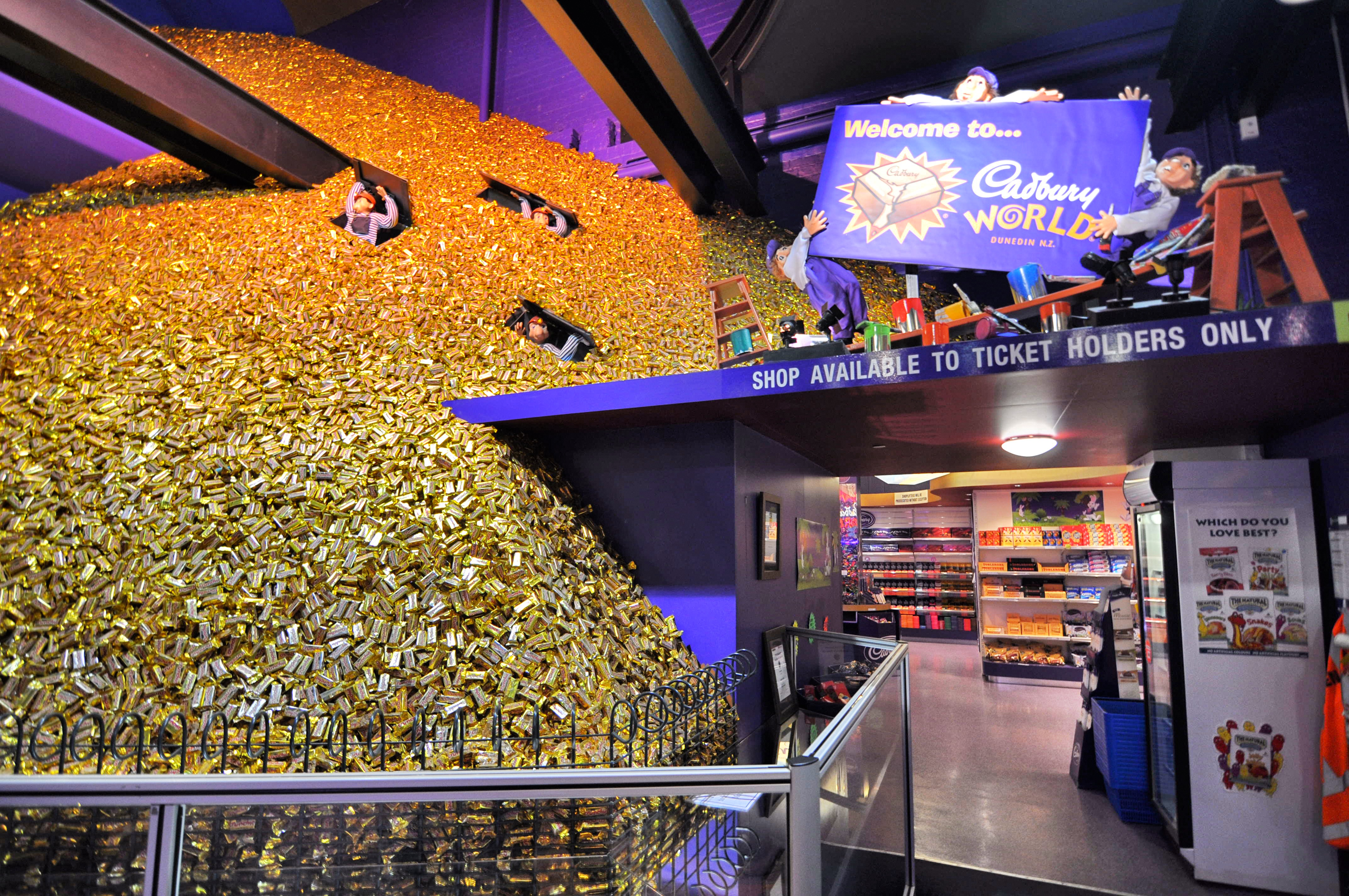
Entrance to the former Cadbury World shop, Dunedin

== See also ==
- Cadbury
- Cadbury Ireland
- Cadbury's Claremont
- History of Cadbury
- Cadbury chocolate factory, Toronto
