= Neilson Dairy =

Canadian dairy company

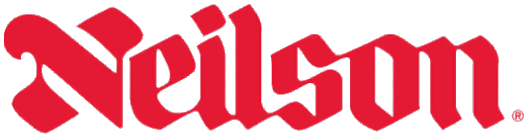

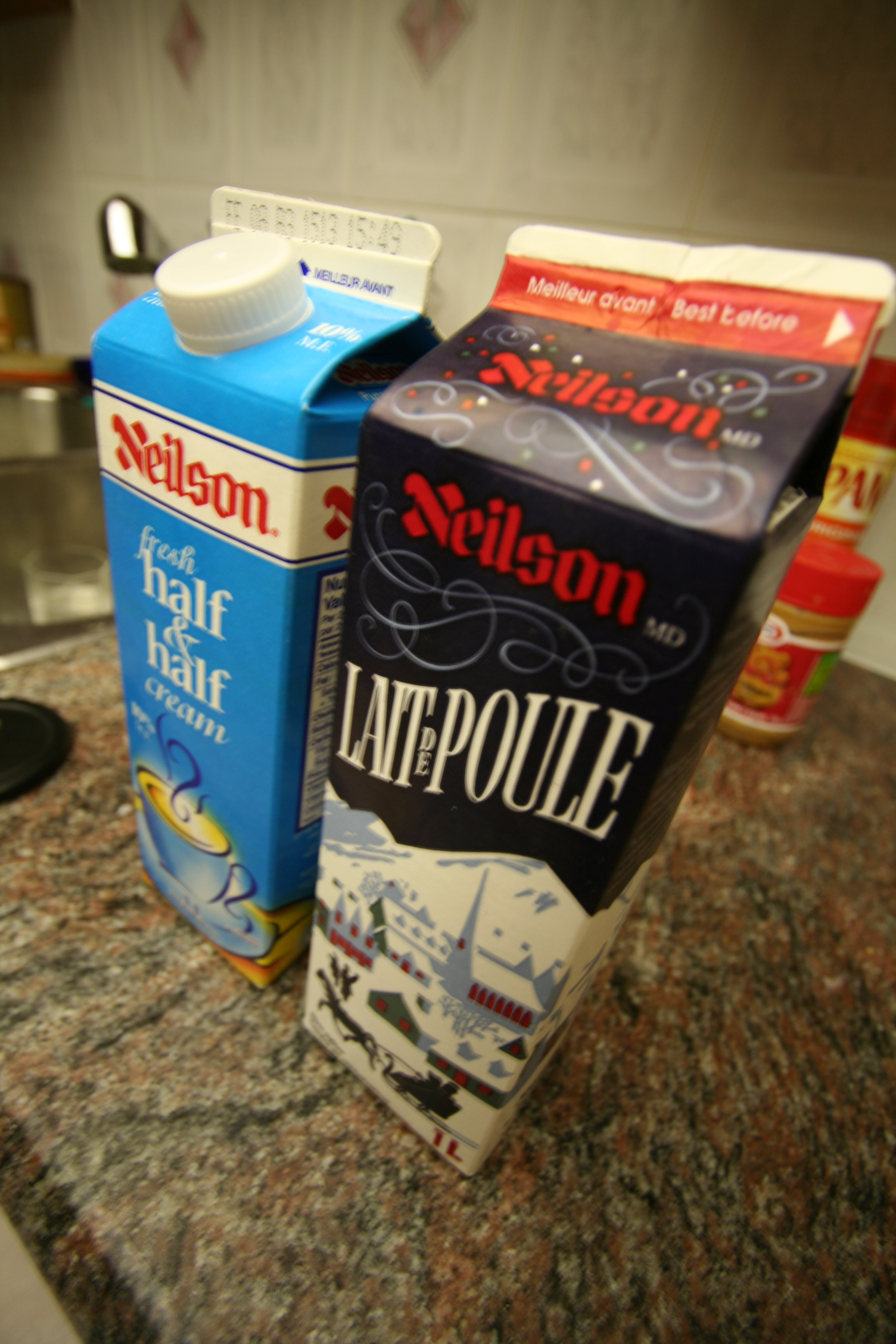
- Neilson Half & Half and Eggnog cartons
- Industry: Dairy
- Founded: 1893; 133 years ago
- Founder: William Neilson
- Headquarters: Toronto, Ontario, Canada

William Neilson Dairy Limited is a Canadian dairy company owned by Saputo Inc. The company is based in Toronto, Ontario. In the United States, its products are sold under the name Neilson.

Its products are sold at Loblaws, Real Canadian Superstore, No Frills, Giant Tiger, Fortinos, and Shoppers Drug Mart, among others.

== History ==
In 1889, William and Mary Neilson moved to Toronto to a rented home and market garden on Lynd Avenue. While William worked as a farmhand in North Dakota, Mary raised crops to sell to feed their five children. When William returned to Toronto, the family bought seven cows and began selling milk and butter to neighbours, delivered by their eldest son Morden on his way to school. They later bought three ice cream machines and began making ice cream for sale. By 1893, the Neilsons were making 3,700 imperial gallons (17,000 L) per year, outgrowing their Lynd Avenue property. The Neilson bought property on Gladstone Avenue, building a three-storey home and a factory for 25 employees, both retained to this day as part of the Cadbury complex.

Neilson Dairy became incorporated as William Neilson Limited in 1907. In 1910, a second factory was constructed on Gladstone. As ice cream was mostly a seasonal product, the company further diversified into boxed chocolate and bulk chocolates. By 1914, Neilson Limited sold one million gallons of ice cream and 500,000 pounds (230,000 kg) of chocolate per year. In 1914, it introduced its first chocolate bar, the Neilson's Soldier Bar, sent to Allied troops in Europe during World War I. The company would later invent several chocolate bars, like Crispy Crunch, Jersey Milk, Malted Milk, Mr. Big and Sweet Marie.

William Neilson died by accident in 1915 and son Morden took over as president and sons Charles and Allan were executives. Under William's sons' leadership, it became the largest manufacturer of ice cream in the British Empire and the largest chocolate manufacturer in Canada. Production of ice cream was moved to a former cheese factory in Beachville, southwest of Toronto.

By 1928, the company employed a thousand people in all departments and production was at one thousand gallons of ice cream per hour, and the company opened branches in South America, South Africa, Japan, China, Australia and New Zealand. After Morden died in 1947, William Neilson Ltd. was sold to George Weston Limited, operating as a separate entity under Charles Neilson, and later, Allan Neilson. One promotion provided 55,000 maps of Canada to schools across Canada, each map bearing the logo of Neilson's and pictures of Neilson's chocolates.

In the 1980s, Neilson bought the Canadian chocolate-making assets of the British firm Cadbury to add to its existing chocolate bar products and renamed the company Neilson Cadbury. In April 1990, Arthur Soler was named Neilson Cadbury president by Weston Limited. That same year, the ice cream business was sold to Ault Foods, itself acquired by Nestle in 1997. Weston sold the entire Neilson confectionary business, including both the Neilson and the Cadbury product lines back to Cadbury in 1996, while retaining the dairy-related side of the business. Cadbury continues to make chocolate products in the former Neilson complex on Gladstone, including continuing production of Crispy Crunch and Mr. Big.

In 2004, Neilson Limited introduced milk containing the docosahexaenoic acid (DHA) omega-3 fatty acid in Ontario, and in Quebec in 2006 The health benefit was to combat the declining intake of fish, the primary source of DHA in human diets.

The remaining Neilson dairy business was sold by Weston in 2008 to Saputo. Today, it manufactures several milk products, including lactose-free, and various grades of milk to consumers, milk beverages, butter and yogurt. Production is headquartered in Georgetown, Ontario.

== Products ==
A list of brands and products sold by Neilson Dairy past and present:

- Neilson dairy products including, milk, butter, ice cream and instant puddings.
- Häagen-Dazs ice cream licence – acquired in 1981, sold to Ault Foods in 1990.
- Cadbury Confectionery Company Canadian operations – acquired in 1987, sold all confectionery and chocolate products back to British Cadbury in 1996. Neilson licenses Caramilk and Crispy Crunch-flavoured chocolate milk.
- Neilson chocolate bars – Jersey Milk, Mr. Big, Malted Milk, Sweet Marie and Crispy Crunch (for which the recipe was changed), Pep, Will-O-Pak sold to British Cadbury in 1996. Will-O-Paks continue to have the Neilson brand name on them; however, they are now manufactured by Mondelez Canada. Jersey Milk chocolate bars were discontinued in July 2025.
- Neilson Bite-size chocolates – Neilson sold several varieties of chocolate snacks, including Golden Buds, small milk chocolates that are very similar to Rosebuds; Slowpokes, similar to Turtles; and Willocrisp, flaky peanut wafers dipped in chocolate, similar to Crispy Crunch.

== Operations ==
Neilson dairy operations past and present:

- Beachville, Ontario – former ice cream operations (closed)
- Georgetown, Ontario
- Guelph, Ontario – former Royal Dairy (closed)
- Ottawa, Ontario – former Clark Dairy
- Toronto, Ontario – former Donlands Dairy and Neilson-Cadbury chocolate factory – sold
- Montreal, Quebec
- Barrie, Ontario
