= History of Cadbury =

Cadbury is a British multinational confectionery company owned by Mondelēz International. It is the second largest confectionery brand in the world after Mars. Cadbury is headquartered in Uxbridge, London, and operates in more than fifty countries worldwide. Its best known products include Dairy Milk chocolates.

In 1824, John Cadbury began to sell tea, coffee and drinking chocolate from his premises in Birmingham. Cadbury developed the business with his brother Benjamin, and later his sons Richard and George. George developed the Bournville estate, a model village designed to improve the living conditions of company employees. Dairy Milk chocolate, introduced in 1905, used a higher proportion of milk within the recipe compared with rival products. By 1914, the chocolate was the company's best-selling product.

Cadbury merged with J. S. Fry & Sons in 1919, and Schweppes in 1969. Cadbury was a constant constituent of the FTSE 100 from the index's 1984 inception until the company was bought by Kraft Foods in 2010.

== 1824–1900: Early history ==
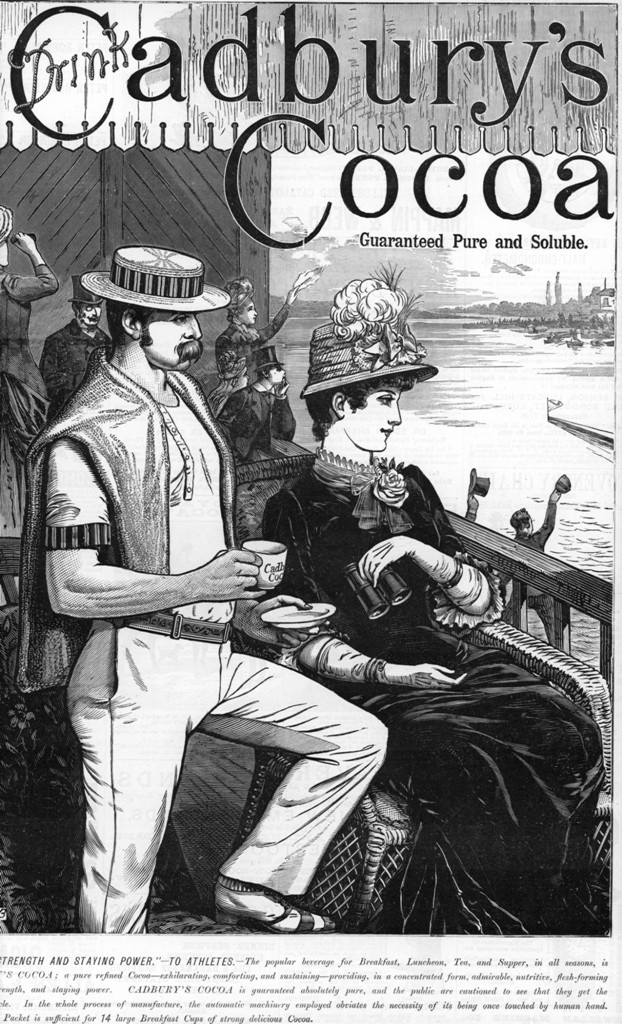
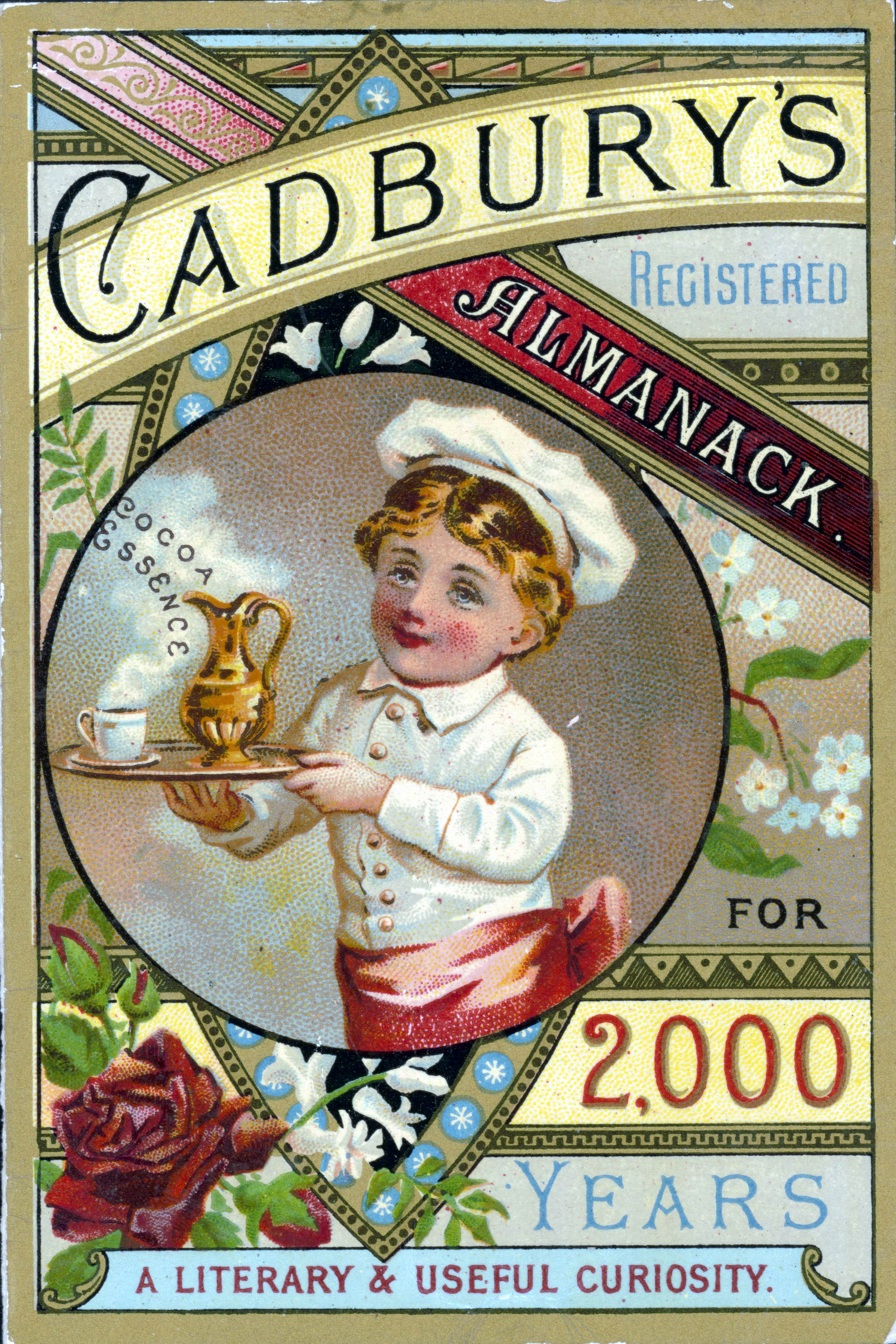
Two advertisements for Cadbury's cocoa of 1885

On 4 March 1824, John Cadbury began selling tea, coffee, and drinking chocolate in Bull Street in Birmingham, England. From 1831 he moved into the production of a variety of cocoa and drinking chocolates, made in a factory in Bridge Street and sold mainly to the wealthy because of the high cost of production. In 1847 John Cadbury became a partner with his brother Benjamin and the company became known as "Cadbury Brothers". The partnership coincided with national tax cuts on imported cocoa beans, which allowed the business to expand.

The brothers opened an office in London. In 1854 they received the Royal Warrant as manufacturers of chocolate and cocoa to Queen Victoria. The company went into decline in the late 1850s.

John Cadbury's sons Richard and George took over the business in 1861. At the time of the takeover, the business was in rapid decline: the number of employees had reduced from 20 to 11, and the company was losing money. By 1864 Cadbury was profitable again. The brothers had turned around the business by moving the focus from tea and coffee to chocolate, and by increasing the quality of their products.

The firm's first major breakthrough occurred in 1866 when Richard and George introduced an improved cocoa into Britain. A new cocoa press developed in the Netherlands removed some of the unpalatable cocoa butter from the cocoa bean. The firm began exporting its products in the 1870s. In the 1880s the firm began to produce chocolate confectioneries.

In 1878 the brothers decided to build new premises in countryside four miles from Birmingham. The move to the countryside was unprecedented in business. Better transport access for milk that was inward shipped by canal, and cocoa that was brought in by rail from London, Southampton and Liverpool docks was taken into consideration. With the development of the Birmingham West Suburban Railway along the path of the Worcester and Birmingham Canal, they acquired the Bournbrook estate, comprising 14.5 acres (5.9 ha) of countryside 5 miles (8.0 km) south of the outskirts of Birmingham. Located next Stirchley Street railway station, which itself was opposite the canal, they renamed the estate Bournville and opened the Bournville factory the following year.

In 1893, George Cadbury bought 120 acres (49 ha) of land close to the works and planned, at his own expense, a model village which would 'alleviate the evils of modern more cramped living conditions'. By 1900 the estate included 314 cottages and houses set on 330 acres (130 ha) of land. As the Cadbury family were Quakers there were no pubs in the estate.

In 1897, following the lead of Swiss companies, Cadbury introduced its own line of milk chocolate bars.

On June 16, 1899, Cadbury became a private limited company. At that time, Richard and George owned 100% of the ordinary shares and the Bournville factory had 2,600 employees.

== 1900–1969 ==
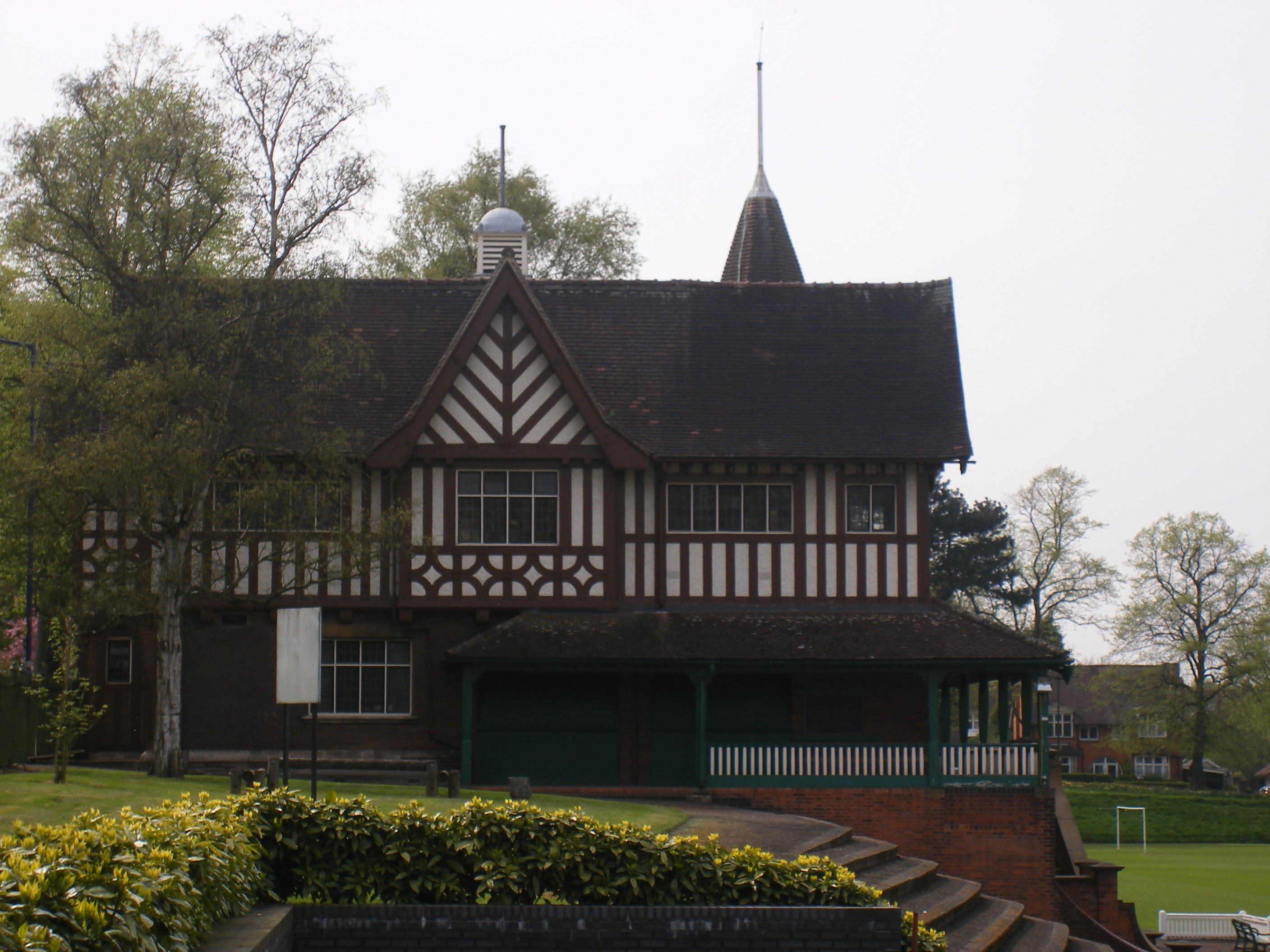
The Cadbury Cricket Pavilion in Bournville was opened by Edward VII in 1902.

In 1905, Cadbury launched its Dairy Milk bar, a production of exceptional quality with a higher proportion of milk than previous chocolate bars. Developed by George Cadbury Jr, it was the first time a British company had been able to mass-produce milk chocolate. From the beginning, it had the distinctive purple wrapper. It was a great sales success, and became the company's best selling product by 1914. The stronger Bournville Cocoa line was introduced in 1906. Cadbury Dairy Milk and Bournville Cocoa were to provide the basis for the company's rapid pre-war expansion. In 1910, Cadbury sales overtook those of Fry for the first time. By 1914, exports accounted for 40 percent of Cadbury's sales.

Cadbury's Milk Tray was first produced in 1915 and continued in production throughout the remainder of the First World War. More than 2,000 of Cadbury's male employees joined the Armed Forces and to support the war effort, Cadbury provided clothing, books and chocolate to soldiers. After the war, the Bournville factory was redeveloped and mass production began in earnest.

In 1919 Cadbury merged with J. S. Fry & Sons, another leading British chocolate manufacturer, resulting in the integration of well-known brands such as Fry's Chocolate Cream and Fry's Turkish Delight. The company was registered as British Cocoa and Chocolate on May 19, 1919. After the merger, the Cadburys held 54.56% of the company's ordinary shares, as well as six seats on the company board. In 1921, the many small Fry's factories around Bristol were closed down, and production was consolidated at a new factory in Somerdale, outside Bristol.

In 1921, Cadbury established Cadbury's Claremont, their first overseas factory in Hobart, Tasmania, Australia.

Inter-war Britain saw cocoa replaced by chocolate (especially milk chocolate bars) as Britain's preferred product.

Fruit and Nut was introduced as part of the Dairy Milk line in 1928, soon followed by Whole Nut in 1933. By this point, Cadbury was the brand leader in the United Kingdom. These were accompanied by several other products: Flake (1920), Cream-filled eggs (1923), Crunchie (1929) (Crunchie was originally launched under the Fry's name but later adopted by Cadbury's) and Roses (1938).

By 1930 Cadbury had become the 24th largest British manufacturing company as measured by estimated market value of capital. Cadbury took direct control of the under-performing Fry in 1935. By 1936, Dairy Milk accounted for 60 percent of the UK milk chocolate market.

Chocolate ceased to be a luxury product and became affordable to the working classes for the first time. By the mid-1930s, Cadbury estimated that 90 percent of the British population could afford to buy chocolate.

During World War II, parts of the Bournville factory were turned over to war work, producing milling machines and seats for fighter aircraft. Workers ploughed football fields to plant crops. As chocolate was regarded as an essential food, it was placed under government supervision for the entire war. The wartime rationing of chocolate ended in 1950, and normal production resumed. Cadbury subsequently invested in new factories and had an increasing demand for their products.

In 1952 the Moreton factory was built. In 1956, Cadbury began manufacturing in Bombay.

In 1967 Cadbury acquired an Australian confectioner, MacRobertson's, beating a rival bid from Mars. As a result of the takeover, Cadbury built a 60 percent market share in the Australian market. The acquisition brought such brands as Freddo and Snack to the Cadbury roster.

== Schweppes merger and demerger (1969–2007) ==
Cadbury merged with drinks company Schweppes to form Cadbury Schweppes in 1969. At the time, the Cadbury family held seven of the thirteen seats on the company board, plus chairmanship. The Cadbury family held approximately 50% of the ordinary shares, while the Frys held about 10%. The remaining shares were distributed among more than 200 ordinary shareholders. Head of Schweppes, Lord Watkinson, became chairman, and Adrian Cadbury became deputy chairman and managing director. Shortly after the merger, the business bought Kenco from Trust Houses Ltd.

The benefits of the merger were to prove elusive. The merger put an end to Cadbury's close links to its Quaker founding family and its perceived social ethos by instilling a capitalist venture philosophy in management.

The 1970s saw the development and launch of a number of chocolate bars: the Curly Wurly, the Double Decker and Caramel. After a landmark advertising campaign, the sales of Flake quadrupled. However the launch of the Rowntree Yorkie chocolate bar in the UK in 1976 seriously dented the sales of Dairy Milk, and Cadbury's UK market share declined to 20 percent. In order to counter a declining market share, Cadbury reduced its number of lines from 78 to 33, and installed state-of-the-art technology at the Bourneville plant.

In 1978 the company acquired Peter Paul, the third largest chocolate manufacturer in the United States for $58 million, which gave it a 10 percent share of the world's largest confectionery market. The highly successful Wispa chocolate bar was launched in the North East of England in 1981, and nationwide in 1984. In 1982, trading profits were greater outside of Britain than in the UK for the first time.

In 1986, Cadbury Schweppes sold its Beverages and Foods division to a management buyout led by Paul Judge, which became Premier Brands, for £97 million. This saw the company divest itself of such brands as Typhoo Tea, Kenco, Smash and Hartley Chivers jam. The deal also saw Premier take the license for production of Cadbury brand biscuits and drinking chocolate.

In 1986, Schweppes switched its alliance in the UK from Pepsi to Coca-Cola, taking a 51 percent stake in the joint venture Coca-Cola Schweppes. In 1986, the company acquired Canada Dry and Sunkist from RJR Nabisco for $230 million, and took a 30 percent stake in Dr Pepper. As a result of these acquisitions, Cadbury Schweppes became the third largest soft drinks manufacturer in the world.

In 1987, General Cinema took an 18 percent stake in the company. General Cinema divested itself of the stake in 1990. In 1988, Cadbury US was sold to Hershey for $300 million.

Snapple, Mistic and Stewart's were sold by Triarc to Cadbury Schweppes in 2000 for $1.45 billion. In October of that same year, Cadbury Schweppes purchased Royal Crown from Triarc.

In 2002, the Danish manufacturer of chewing gum, DANDY, sold their brand to Cadbury together with the brands DIROL, STIMOROL, and V6. The remaining activities were renamed Gumlink.

Logo used from 2003 to 2021

In 2003, Cadbury dropped the 's' from its name and renamed the brand to Cadbury. The reason behind this change was because the company found that it was a much more suited, rounded name than the previous "Cadbury's". This change was officially announced on 19 December 2002.

In March 2007, it was revealed that Cadbury Schweppes was planning to split its business into two separate entities: one focusing on its main chocolate and confectionery market; the other on its US drinks business. The demerger took effect on 2 May 2008, with the drinks business becoming Dr Pepper Snapple Group. In December 2008 it was announced that Cadbury was to sell its Australian beverage unit to Asahi Breweries.

== 2007–2010 ==
In October 2007, Cadbury announced the closure of the Somerdale Factory, Keynsham, formerly part of Fry's. Between 500 and 700 jobs were affected by this change. Production transferred to other plants in England and Poland.

In 2008 Monkhill Confectionery, the Own Label trading division of Cadbury Trebor Bassett was sold to Tangerine Confectionery for £58 million cash. This sale included factories at Pontefract, Cleckheaton and York and a distribution centre near Chesterfield, and the transfer of around 800 employees.

In mid-2009 Cadbury replaced some of the cocoa butter in their non-UK chocolate products with palm oil. Despite stating this was a response to consumer demand to improve taste and texture, there was no "new improved recipe" claim placed on New Zealand labels. Consumer backlash was significant from environmentalists and chocolate lovers. By August 2009, the company announced that it was reverting to the use of cocoa butter in New Zealand. In addition, they would source cocoa beans through Fair Trade channels. In January 2010 prospective buyer Kraft pledged to honour Cadbury's commitment.

== Acquisition by Kraft Foods ==
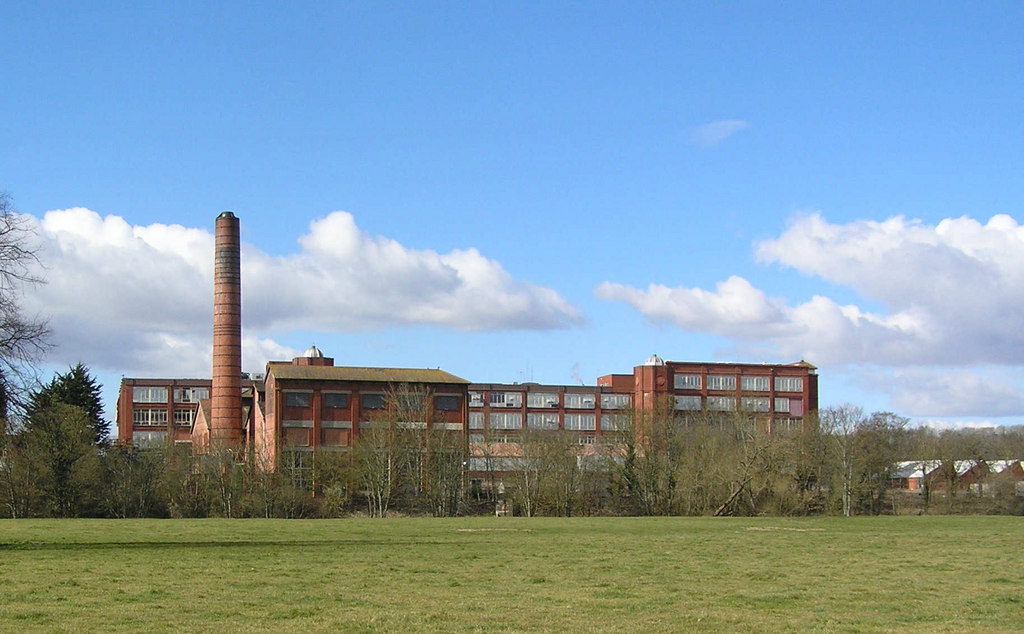
The former Fry's factory in Somerdale (1921–2010)

On 7 September 2009 Kraft Foods made a £10.2 billion (US$16.2 billion) indicative takeover bid for Cadbury. The offer was rejected, with Cadbury stating that it undervalued the company. Kraft launched a formal, hostile bid for Cadbury valuing the firm at £9.8 billion on 9 November 2009. Business Secretary Peter Mandelson warned Kraft not to try to "make a quick buck" from the acquisition of Cadbury.

On 19 January 2010, it was announced that Cadbury and Kraft Foods had reached a deal and that Kraft would purchase Cadbury for £8.40 per share, valuing Cadbury at £11.5bn (US$18.9bn). Kraft, which issued a statement stating that the deal will create a "global confectionery leader", had to borrow £7 billion (US$11.5bn) in order to finance the takeover.

The Hershey Company, based in Pennsylvania, manufactures and distributes Cadbury-branded chocolate (but not its other confectionery) in the United States and has been reported to share Cadbury's "ethos". Hershey had expressed an interest in buying Cadbury because it would broaden its access to faster-growing international markets. But on 22 January 2010, Hershey announced that it would not counter Kraft's final offer.

The acquisition of Cadbury faced widespread disapproval from the British public, as well as groups and organisations including trade union Unite, who estimated that a takeover by Kraft could put 30,000 jobs "at risk". Controversially, RBS, a bank 84% owned by the United Kingdom Government, funded the Kraft takeover.

On 2 February 2010, Kraft secured over 71% of Cadbury's shares thus finalising the deal. Kraft had needed to reach 75% of the shares in order to be able to delist Cadbury from the stock market and fully integrate it as part of Kraft. This was achieved on 5 February 2010, and the company announced that Cadbury shares would be de-listed on 8 March 2010.

On 3 February 2010, the chairman Roger Carr, chief executive Todd Stitzer and chief financial officer Andrew Bonfield all announced their resignations. Stitzer had worked at the company for 27 years.

On 9 February 2010, Kraft announced that they were planning to close the Somerdale Factory, Keynsham, with the loss of 400 jobs. The management explained that existing plans to move production to Poland were too advanced to be realistically reversed, though assurances had been given regarding sustaining the plant. Staff at Keynsham criticised this move, suggesting that they felt betrayed and as if they have been "sacked twice".

In June 2010 the Polish division, Cadbury-Wedel, was sold to Lotte of Korea. The European Commission made the sale a condition of the Kraft takeover. As part of the deal Kraft will keep the Cadbury, Hall's and other brands along with two plants in Skarbimierz-Osiedle. Lotte will take over the plant in Warsaw along with the E Wedel brand.

On 4 August 2011, Kraft Foods announced they would be splitting into two companies beginning on 1 October 2012. The confectionery business of Kraft became Mondelēz International, of which Cadbury is a subsidiary.

=== 200th anniversary: 2024–present ===
On 8 January 2024, Mondelez International announced plans to celebrate the 200th anniversary of Cadbury, including; promotions, celebrations, announcements throughout 2024 and seven retro packaging designs for its Cadbury Dairy Milk bars.

On 17 March 2024, Cadbury celebrated their bicentenary by unveiling their newly refurbished UK archive. The new archive which costed £350,000, documents over 50,000 Cadbury items including; packaging history, artworks, and discontinued products.

On 23 December 2024, after 170 years of its association with the British monarchy, since the reign of Queen Victoria, it was announced that Cadbury would now no longer hold its Royal Warrant under King Charles III. In a statement by a Mondelez spokesperson: "Whilst we are disappointed to be one of hundreds of other businesses and brands in the UK [...] to not have a new warrant awarded, we are proud to have previously held one, and we fully respect the decision."

== See also ==
- Cadbury's Claremont
- Cadbury Ireland
- Cadbury World
