= Jersey Milk =

Chocolate bar brand

- Product type: Chocolate bar
- Country: Canada
- Introduced: 1924; 102 years ago
- Discontinued: July 8, 2025; 16 months ago
- Related brands: List of Neilson Dairy products List of Cadbury products
- Markets: Canada, United States

Jersey Milk was a Canadian chocolate bar brand consisting of solid milk chocolate. It had a white wrapper with gold writing. Its origins were in Toronto, Canada, the product of William Neilson Limited.

== History ==
The Jersey Milk chocolate bar was introduced in 1924. Originally produced by Neilson Dairy, production was transferred to Cadbury's when Neilson sold the Cadbury's product lines that Neilson had acquired in 1987 back to Cadbury's in 1996. Further consolidation in the food products industry saw the Neilson portfolio of chocolates become part of the Kraft-Mondelez conglomerate, eventually separated into Mondelez Limited. Jersey Milk packages continued to bear the Neilson brand as of January 2022.

As of April 2016, the only package of Jersey Milk listed on the Snack Works web site was a 700-gram package of Jersey Milk Miniatures, although the Canadian Favourites web site listed a 180-gram pack of four 45-gram bars, London Drugs offered 45-gram bars, and Amazon.com offered a 100-gram bar.

Jersey Milk was discontinued on July 7, 2025, by Mondelez Canada. According to Mondelez, an internal review showed consumers shifting to other solid milk chocolate brands, including Cadbury Dairy Milk.

== Flavours of Jersey Milk ==
- Jersey Milk Milk Chocolate
- Jersey Milk Miniatures
- Jersey Milk Buds
- Virginia (Jersey Milk with Peanuts)
- Jersey Milk Treasures (A candy bar where each square contains one of six different flavours. Turkish Delight, Caramel, Praline, Bordeaux, Strawberry and Nougat.

== See also ==
- Cadbury Dairy Milk
