= William Neilson (businessman) =

Canadian businessman

- Born: March 16, 1844; Ramsay Township, Ontario, Canada
- Died: February 10, 1915 (aged 70); Toronto, Ontario, Canada
- Occupation: Businessman
- Known for: Founder of William Neilson Limited
- Spouse: Mary Eva Kaiser (m. 1875)
- Children: 5

William Neilson (March 16, 1844 – February 10, 1915) was a Canadian businessman and founder of William Neilson Limited.

== Early life ==
Neilson was born in Ramsay Township, Lanark County, Canada West to Scottish parents.

His working life began as a farmer in Rochester, New York, then moved on to being a machinist's apprentice in Almonte, Ontario, Canada. In 1873 journeyman Neilson worked in Brockville, Ontario, moving on in 1889 to a retail store. Afterward he sold his store in 1890 and moved to Toronto, Ontario and began a grocery store that eventually failed. Leaving his family behind, he moved to North Dakota to work as a farmer with his brother.

== Founding of William Neilson Limited ==
Returning to Toronto, still in debt, he purchased some cows and began the sale of milk. Neilson then obtained ice cream manufacturing equipment. In 1893 the firm, William Neilson Limited, was started. Ice-cream and mincemeat were the first products, and these fuelled the growth of the company.

Expansion and modernization started in 1904 with a new location and the addition of new equipment. By 1905 production was at two thousand gallons of ice-cream per day and 15 tons of ice. Meanwhile, mincemeat production was discontinued. Neilson constructed the factory in Toronto in 1906. Chocolate was added to the product mix in 1908. Chocolate bars and ice cream became popular treats and prior to the outbreak of the First World War the company was producing more than 560,000 pounds of chocolate annually. This required further expansion and a new building was added, and by 1915 a new site was required and the production moved to Beachville, Ontario.

By 1928, the company employed a thousand people in all departments and production was at one thousand gallons of ice cream per hour, and the company opened branches in South America, South Africa, Japan, China, Australia and New Zealand.

William Neilson Limited, now headquartered in Georgetown, Ontario, was owned by George Weston Limited from 1947 to 2008 and is now owned by Saputo Incorporated.

== Marriage and family ==
Neilson married Mary Eva Kaiser on October 6, 1875, in Brockville, Ontario. They were the parents of five children, of which the sons continued the business after the death of their father in 1915.

Fred Harry Morden Neilson, the family's official churner, ran the business as president until his death in 1947. Charles Edward Neilson was secretary-treasurer and James William Allen Neilson was a vice-president.

The Neilson family are buried at Forest Lawn Mausoleum in north Toronto.
