= Crispy Crunch =

Canadian chocolate bar

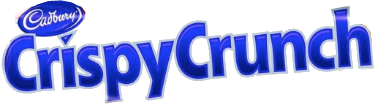
- Product type: Chocolate bar
- Current owner: Cadbury
- Country: Canada
- Introduced: 1930; 96 years ago

Crispy Crunch is a hard chocolate bar with a crispy peanut butter flake inside that is made by Cadbury in Canada. Harold Oswin, an employee of William Neilson Ltd., developed "Crispy Crunch" in 1930.

== History ==
Harold Oswin joined Neilson when he was fourteen years old in 1917. He started out as a candy roller in Neilson's hard candy room. He was promoted to candy maker in the late 1920s. In 1930, when a chocolate bar contest was announced, he submitted his concept; peanut butter coated in a mixture of sugar, molasses and vanilla, dipped in chocolate. Harold won the contest and received a $5.00 prize, and was promoted to foreman. At the time Oswin's father, aunt and two brothers worked at the plant. He would also meet his future wife at the plant. Oswin received no further financial compensation for the bar, and was later named quality control manager at the plant. He received a pension from the plant after he retired in 1968. Due to all of his sampling of sugar products during his lifetime and a lack of dental care, he lost all of his natural teeth. He died in the 1990s.

The original recipe called for a log-shaped bar. Williams Neilson management made the decision to flatten the bar to the shape that it is today. Oswin died in the mid-1990s. In 1986, the company celebrated the sale of 25 million boxes of Crispy Crunch, equivalent to 950 million bars.

The brand was repositioned in 1988 by Norm Williams, director of marketing. The new brief was given to Martin Shewchuck of Leo Burnett Canada who conceived the highly successful Crispy Crunch campaigns ("the only thing better than your Crispy Crunch is someone else's"). The campaign catapulted the brand from No. 10 to No. 1, growing volume by 55%.

Crispy Crunches were sold in the United States for a brief time in the 1990s by the food distribution arm of Pro Set, the collectible card company. Pro Set went bankrupt, resulting in Crispy Crunch no longer being available in the United States. A lower-calorie version of Crispy Crunch was available for a limited time in the mid-1990s.

The original manufacturers, Neilson, sold its chocolate brands to Cadbury in 1996, though packaging continued to feature the Neilson logo for a few years. Since Cadbury began manufacturing of the chocolate bar, the recipe has changed in that it is less salty and more sweet as it has more of the crunchy topaz-coloured candy coating around the centre. Cadbury continues to manufacture the bar in the former Neilson factory on Gladstone Avenue in Toronto, along with other chocolate products for the Canadian market.

== See also ==
- List of chocolate bar brands
- Canadian cuisine
- List of Canadian inventions and discoveries
