= Cadbury Ireland =

Irish subsidiary of Cadbury

Mondelez Ireland Production Ltd

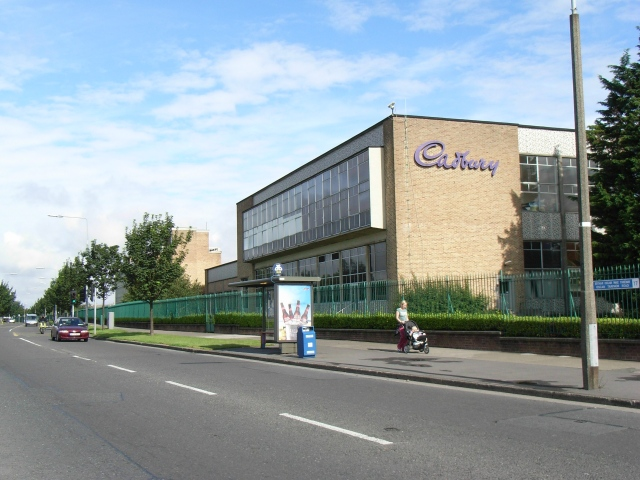
- Cadbury factory in Coolock
- Type: Subsidiary
- Industry: Confectionery
- Founded: 1933; 93 years ago
- Headquarters: Coolock, Dublin, Ireland
- Owner: Mondelēz International
- Parent: Cadbury
- Website: cadbury.ie

Mondelez Ireland Production Limited (trading as Cadbury) is a confectionery company in Ireland based in Coolock in Dublin. It is a subsidiary of Cadbury, currently owned by Mondelēz International. Cadbury Ireland exports over 200 of its products to 30 countries worldwide, making a contribution of €110 million of Irish trade. Cadbury Ireland uses local ingredients.

The company operates two factories in Ireland in Coolock in Dublin (where the headquarters of Cadbury Ireland are located) and in Rathmore in Kerry.

== History ==
The company was established in 1824 in Birmingham by John Cadbury. Cadbury Ireland built its first Irish factory at Ossory Road, Dublin in 1933, at the time, the company manufactured and sold just three products.

The Twirl bar was invented at the Coolock site in the 1980s.

Cadbury was acquired by Kraft Foods in 2010. In 2012, Kraft Foods created a new company, Mondelez, for the purpose of holding a number of brands, including Cadbury.

In 2013, Cadbury Ireland Limited's name was officially changed to Mondelez Ireland Production Limited, although the company continues to trade as Cadbury.

=== Factories ===
The Dublin factory started construction in October 1932. It was the first Cadbury factory outside of England, and the third Cadbury factory to be built.

In 1948 the company built its chocolate crumb factory in Rathmore, County Kerry, about 20 miles from Killarney. This plant allowed Cadbury to bypass restrictions on milk production in the UK, before 1954.

In 1957, the Ossory Road factory was closed, with production moving to its current site in Coolock.

In February 2015, the company announced it was closing its Tallaght plant and moving some of its production from Coolock to Poland, resulting in the loss of about 200 jobs.

== Products ==
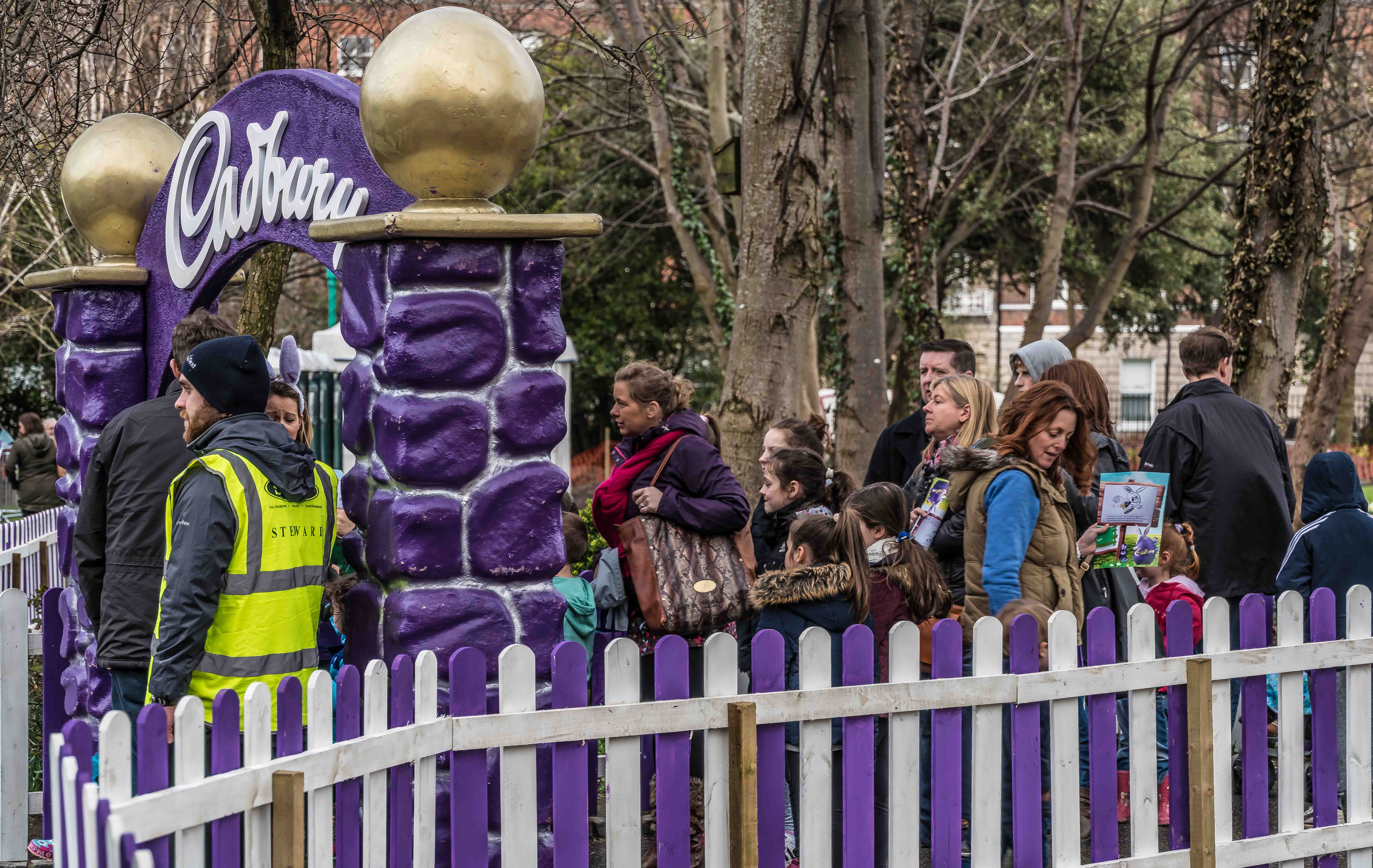
Cadbury Easter egg hunt in Dublin

- Dairy Milk
- Creme Egg
- Boost
- Wispa
- Flake
- Crunchie
- Starbar

== See also ==
- Cadbury
- Cadbury World
- Cadbury's Chocolate Factory, Tasmania
- History of Cadbury
