= Mr. Big (chocolate bar) =

Canadian candy bar

Mr. Big is a chocolate bar produced by Cadbury in Canada. It used to be the largest sized chocolate bar produced by the company, hence the name. The standard bar is made of a layered vanilla wafer biscuit coated in caramel, peanuts, and rice crisps and covered in a chocolatey coating. The bar is the length of two "standard"-sized bars – around 20 centimetres (8 inches) long. Additional varieties include Mr. Chew Big, Mr. Big Fudge, and Mr. Big with Maple.

== History ==
The bar was first produced in Canada by Neilson in 1979. The bar is common in Canada, but is also available in Hungary, Poland, and some areas of the United States.

A Canadian advertising campaign in the 1970s included the tagline "Mr. Big: so big they call him Mister".

The product launched in the U.S. in 1995, and the launch included an advertising campaign with the basketball player Shaquille O'Neal. A miniature Mr. Big chocolate bar is manufactured and marketed for the Halloween season.

In 1996, Neilson sold their candy division, including the rights to make the Mr. Big bar, to Cadbury.

== Brand name ==
The Mr. Big brand name was originally owned by Nestlé and licensed by William Neilson (now Cadbury). This created a situation where the trademark of one of Neilson's largest brands was owned by its largest competitor. Neilson then bought the rights to the name Mr. Big for confectionery.

== Ice cream ==
Mr. Big was the only Cadbury chocolate bar to have an ice cream variant made by Nestlé until 2019. It was discontinued in May 2002 in the UK due to poor sales. An ice cream bar version produced by Nestlé is available in Canada, although other Cadbury ice cream products were previously made by Breyers.
