= Cadbury's Chocolate Factory, Tasmania =

Confectionery factory in Tasmania, Australia

Coordinates: 42°47′33″S 147°16′03″E

Cadbury's Chocolate Factory
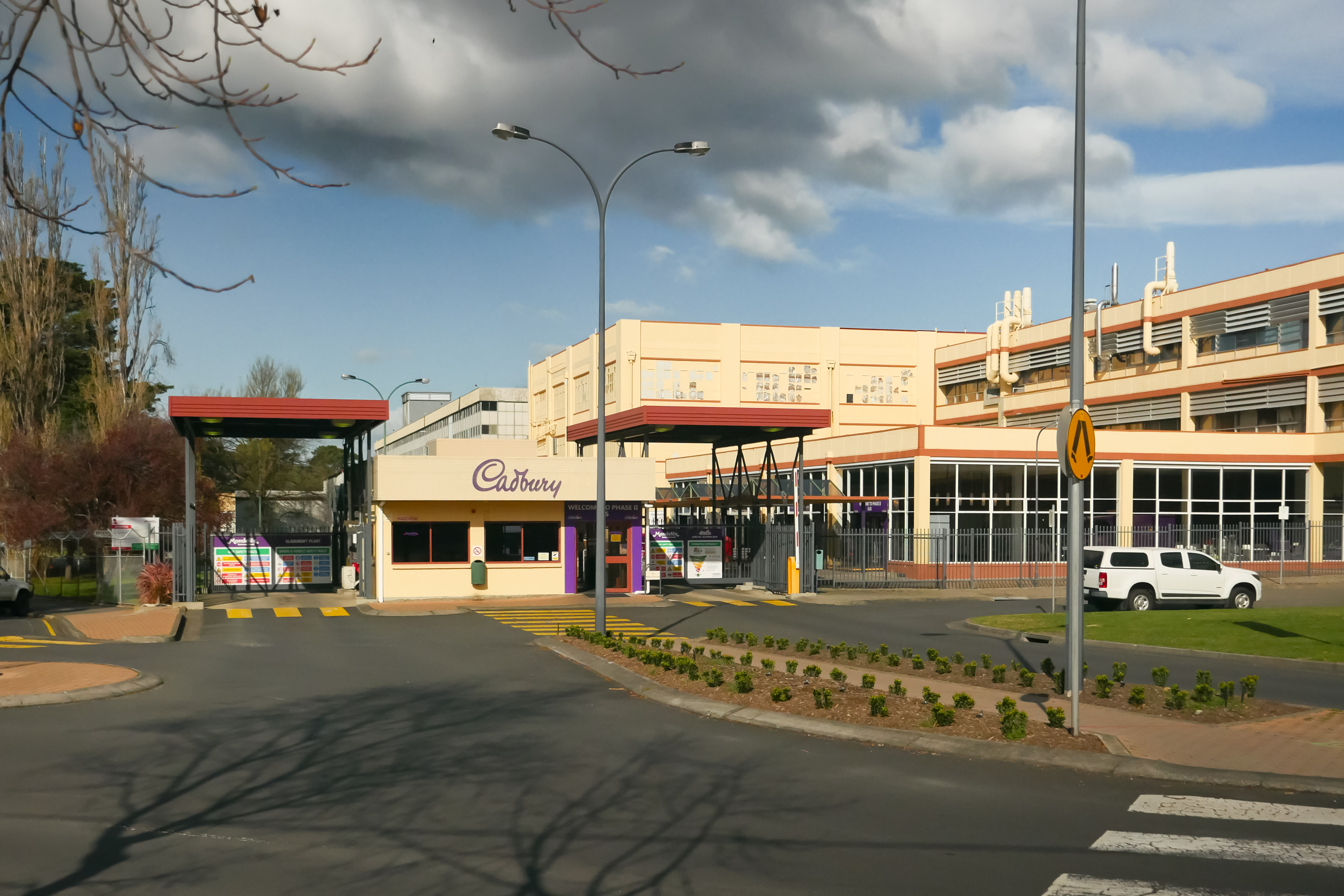
- Entrance to the factory, 2024
- Built: 1920–21
- Operated: 21 October 1921 (105 years ago)
- Location: 100 Cadbury Road; Claremont, Tasmania
- Industry: Chocolate
- Products: Chocolate confectionery
- Employees: 450 (2018)
- Owner: Mondelez International
- Website: cadburyexperience.com.au

Cadbury's Chocolate Factory, also known as Cadbury's Claremont and colloquially as Cadbury's, is a prominent Australian chocolate factory situated in Claremont, Tasmania. Producing a company-record of over 60,000 tonnes (59,000 long tons; 66,000 short tons) of chocolate in 2021, it has earned distinction as "the largest chocolate factory in the Southern Hemisphere". Established in 1921, the factory and surrounding model village estate marked Cadbury's first business expansion outside the United Kingdom. The facility is currently owned by the multinational conglomerate Mondelez International, which purchased Cadbury in 2010.

Initially set up to meet the growing demand for Cadbury products in Australia, the factory became a significant part of the Tasmanian economy. Over the years, the Claremont factory has expanded and modernised, incorporating state-of-the-art manufacturing processes. Technological advancements have reduced the workforce from 1,100 in 1960 to 450 employees in 2018. The Claremont factory primarily produces Dairy Milk chocolate block varieties and Caramello Koala and Freddo chocolate bars.

The factory formerly included visitor facilities where guests could learn about the company's history, observe the production process, and sample chocolates. These were discontinued in 2015 due to health and safety concerns. In 2025, an application was lodged to construct a $150 million chocolate-themed tourism development adjacent to the factory site.

== History ==
Following Cadbury's successful 1919 merger with rival chocolatiers Fry's, the British company decided to expand operations overseas. As Australia was one of the company's largest export markets, it was decided to be an appropriate location for their first factory abroad. After visiting Tasmania in January 1920, executives from Cadbury's selected the unique 246-acre (100 ha) peninsula location at Claremont due to the state's cheap provision of hydro electricity by the Hydro Electric Commission, cool climate and the availability of high-quality fresh dairy production and supply. The Cadbury family were Quakers, and the company executives believed the site at Claremont embodied the Quaker values of the company, offering a tranquil and picturesque setting for workers. With a water frontage of 8.0 kilometres (5 miles), the location inspired the company phrase "By mountain and sea", which the factory used on a range of promotional materials highlighting the business' interest in maintaining a healthy lifestyle.

We are more than charmed with its infinite beauty and variety. The beautiful surroundings of the factory at Claremont were a revelation to us. I had seen drawings and photographs of the model factory "by mountain and sea", but until I actually saw it I had no conception of its glorious situation. It is just wonderful.

— Dorothy Cadbury on Tasmania and the Claremont site, 1922

=== Factory construction ===
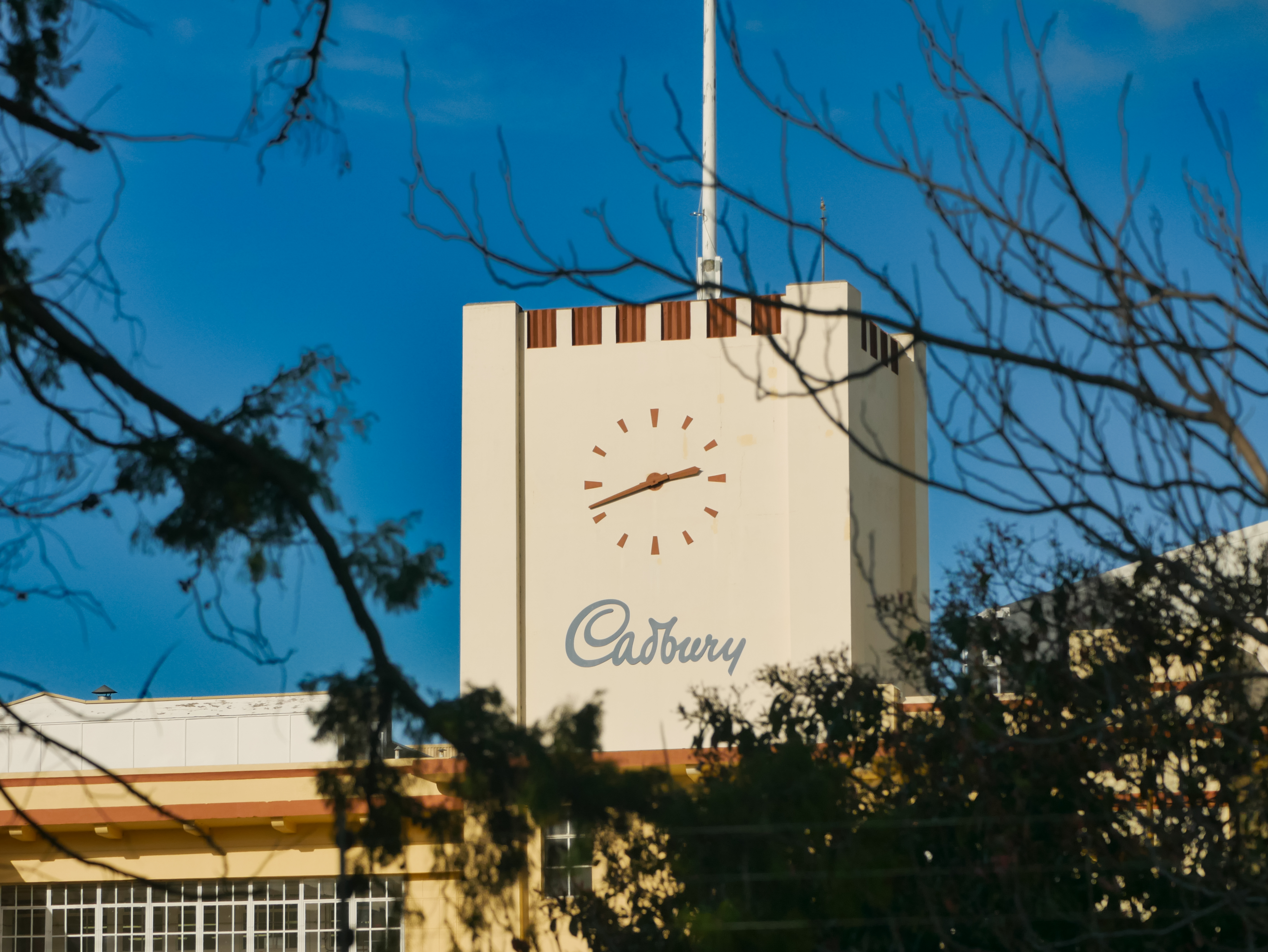
Cadbury factory clock

Commencing construction in 1920, the factory was built entirely of white ferro-concrete. Consisting of 9,200 cubic metres (12,000 cu yd) of concrete, weighing approximately 22,000 tonnes (22,000 long tons; 24,000 short tons), the factory was designed as six rectangular blocks, five of which containing three stories measuring 46 by 15 metres (150 ft × 50 ft). These included ancillary buildings for the warehouse and power and transformer houses, which were interconnected by covered arches on each floor. Forty workers (consisting of twenty-four men and sixteen women) from the original Cadbury factory in Birmingham and Bristol in the United Kingdom relocated to Tasmania to oversee the factory construction and train newly recruited staff.

"Cadbury-Fry-Pascall Factory" at Claremont was officially opened on 21 October 1921. Between March and May 1922, Cadbury's Managing Director Dorothy Cadbury visited the factory, overseeing working conditions from both the perspective of the employee and employer. Her parents, Chairman of Directors Barrow Cadbury and Dame Geraldine Cadbury DBE, and sister Geraldine Mary Cadbury accompanied her on the visit. Bound for Sydney, the first shipment left Cadbury's Claremont on Saturday 8 April 1922, containing Pascall confectionery. Dorothy and Barrow Cadbury returned to Claremont in 1930. Designed by architects Hutchinson & Walker, an additional three-story building measuring 100 metres (340 ft) in length was erected in 1939 at a cost of £A40,000.

=== Cadbury's Estate ===
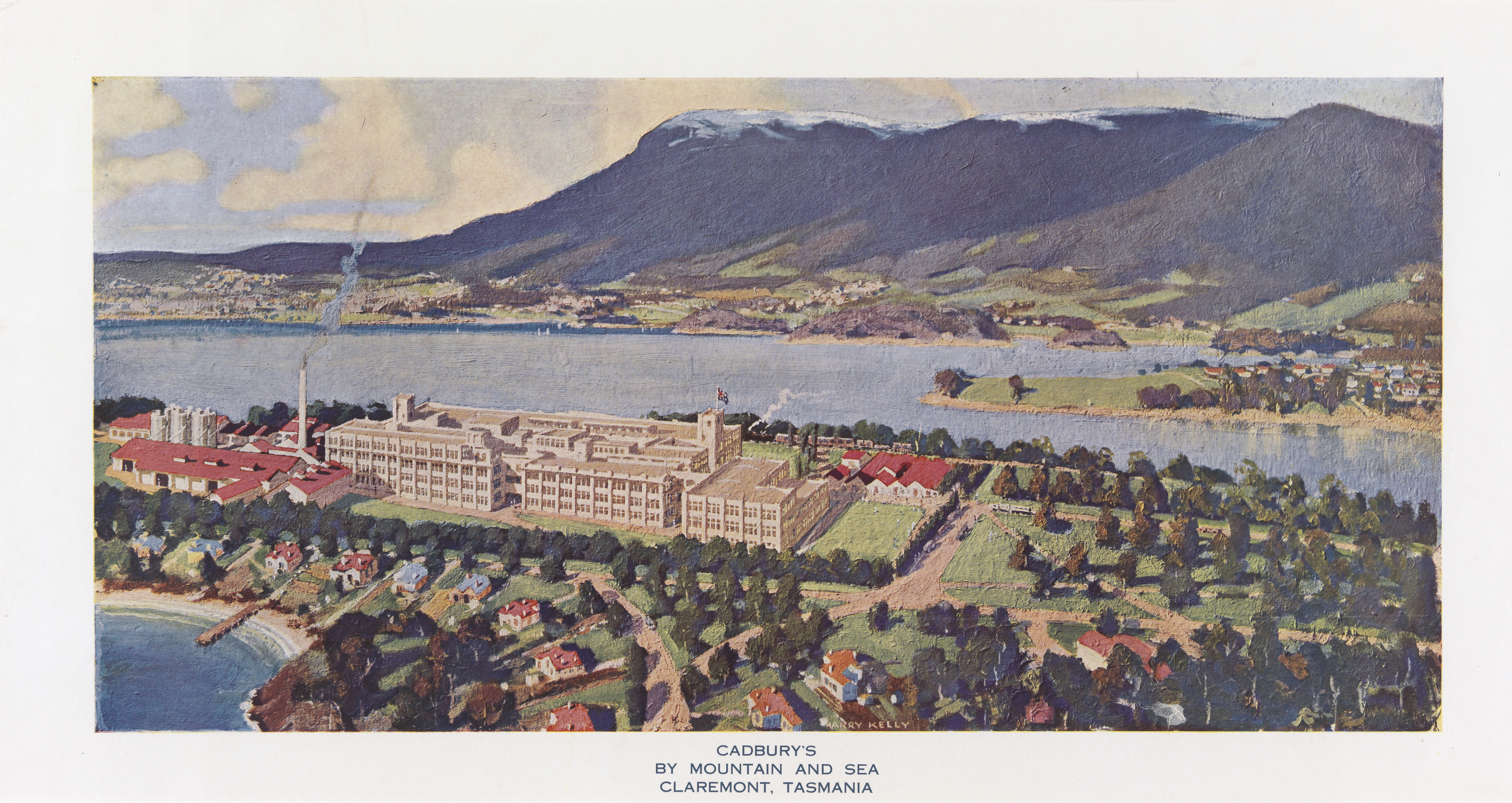
Promotional illustration of the factory, estate and surrounds, 1950s

Based upon the model village of Cadbury's Bournville estate in Birmingham, the newly established 'Cadbury's Estate' embodied Quaker ideology, providing housing for workers, shops, sporting facilities, a school, a Friends meeting house and parkland, complete with purple benches. To assist worker education and social welfare, a variety of organisations and social activities were created within the self-contained community including a youth club, girls’ club, cricket club, a floricultural society and a camera club called "Candied Camera". Located north of the City of Glenorchy, the estate has views of kunanyi / Mount Wellington to the west and both the City of Clarence and Brighton local government area on the eastern shore. Bound by Bilton Bay to the north and Windermere Bay to the south upon the River Derwent, the 246-acre (100 ha) site comprised the model village occupying 108 acres (44 ha) of the peninsula, the factory covering 41 acres (17 ha), recreational and shore reserves consisting of 58 acres (23 ha), and supporting infrastructure occupying a further 43 acres (17 ha).

Within the estate are various roads and buildings containing historical industry namesakes, such as Bournville Road, named after Cadbury's original worker's estate. MacRobertson's Road pays tribute to MacRobertson's, the Australian company which created Cherry Ripe, Freddo Frog and Old Gold, acquired by Cadburys in 1967. Today, the Cadbury's Estate has a rich history with eighteen heritage-listed buildings located on the site, including the former Claremont Primary School.

==== Claremont School ====
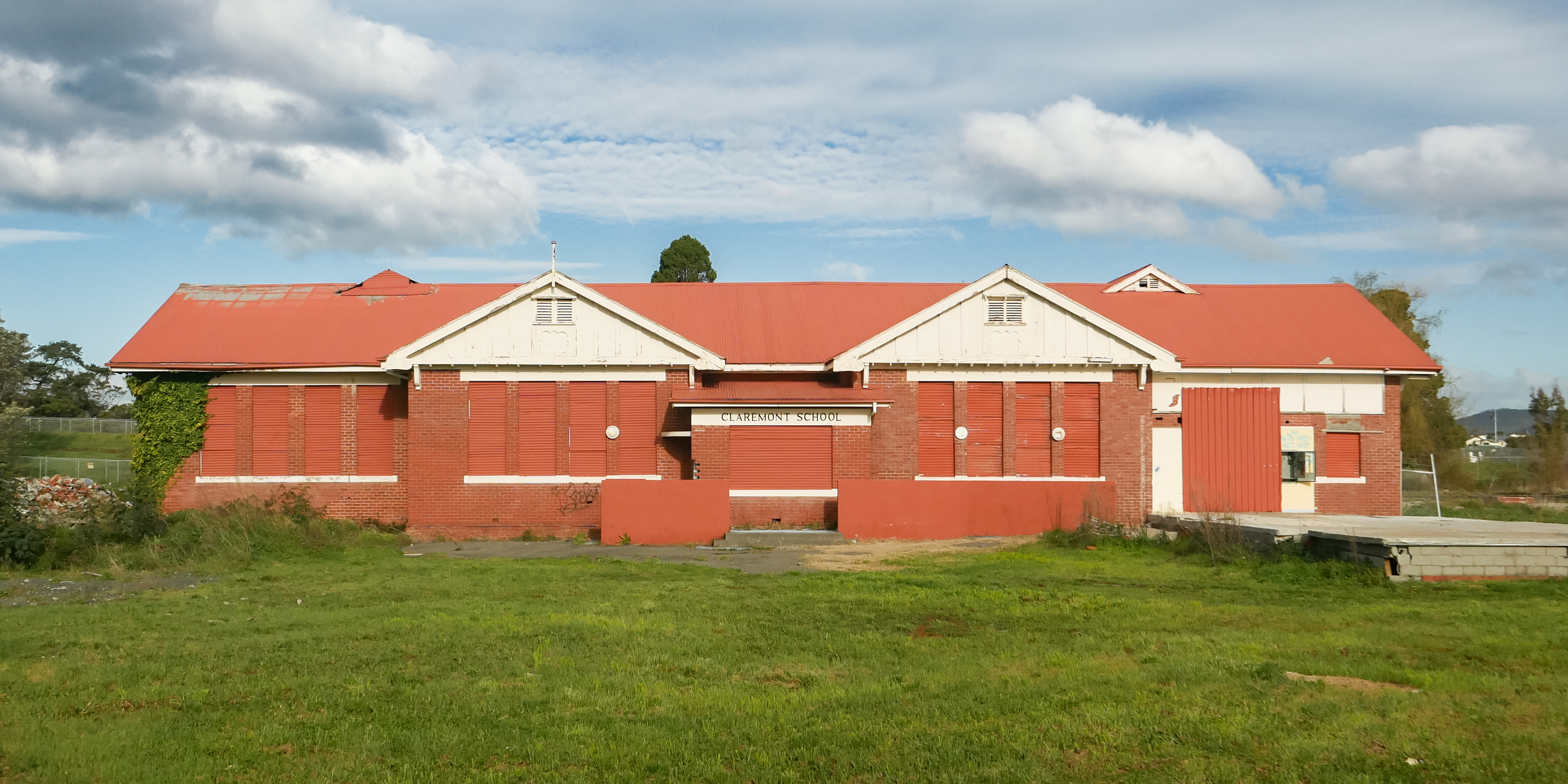
Claremont School remains undeveloped in 2024

Constructed at a cost of £A247, the first school at Claremont opened in July 1890. In 1922, land for a new school was purchased with a brick building constructed for £A1,600. With frontage along Windermere Bay, the new Claremont School was completed on the Cadbury's Estate in 1924 to facilitate factory worker's children. In 1936, a second plot was acquired and a new building constructed at a cost of £A914. The school underwent two rounds of extensions in 1941, with the first wing costing £A2,070, and a second costing £A1,297. The school was closely tied to the Cadbury factory workers, including students planting eighteen trees alongside Cadbury Road leading to the factory in 1949.

As part of the City of Glenorchy's Building the Education Revolution plan in 2009, the Claremont Primary School (as it was then known) was set to close following the proposal of two new primary schools facilitating the area. The school closed in 2013 under the pretence it was to be developed into housing. In 2015, a $79 million subdivision was put forward to develop the site. In 2017 the school was victim to an arson attack, causing upward of $150,000 in damages and destroying one of the school's historic buildings. The school was purchased by businessman Kai Yang in 2019. In 2021, a $200m development on the site called the Windermere Bay Precinct was proposed, featuring 315 apartments and townhouses, a childcare centre, local shops, a cafe, and a gym and pool within the parkland setting. Designed by Circa Morris-Nunn Architects, the remaining heritage-listed school building will be retained and used for community facilities.

==== Cadbury's station ====
The Cadbury's Estate was previously connected to the former North–South rail corridor via a dedicated spur line, terminating at Cadbury's station. The station was operational by September 1921, with the Tasmanian Government Railways operating 26 weekday services along the North–South corridor until the cessation of passenger services in 1974. The former rail corridor has since been repurposed into a cycle track.

== Factory tours ==
Due to the factory's long history and the general appeal of chocolate, Cadbury's Claremont was a major Tasmanian tourism attraction, recording 150,000 visitors annually until its on-site visitor centre closed in 2015.

=== Original factory tour ===
From 1948, the factory conducted public tours of the facility, showcasing the manufacturing process, including the fermenting, drying, roasting, and separating of cocoa beans from their skins to create cocoa powder and cocoa butter. The tour also included an inspection of the factory's pure granite conching machines dating back to the 1950s, industrial machinery and wrapping process, ending with a taste-testing and the collection of free samples. The tours were discontinued in 2008 due to health and safety regulations adopted by the company globally and replaced with a newly built visitor centre at the site in 2010.

=== Visitor Centre closure ===
During the 2013 federal election campaign, then-opposition leader Tony Abbott offered a $16 million grant to develop and upgrade the visitor centre. Once the Abbott government came into power, the parent company Mondelez stated that they had not met the criteria for the grant. In spite of public outcry, the visitor centre was permanently closed on the 18 December 2015.

=== Chocolate Experience ===
The Chocolate Experience at Cadbury is a proposed $150 million tourism development adjacent to the Cadbury factory site, led by developer Simon Currant in partnership with Mondelez International. The project aims to transform the former visitor centre, which closed in 2016, into a visitor attraction featuring a chocolate lounge, masterclass spaces, a cocoa arboretum, and interactive exhibits designed by Tasmanian firm Cumulus Studio in collaboration with Art Processors. Mondelez is not a funding partner, but is leasing the land and providing brand licensing for the venture.

Early announcements for the proposal included a feature described as the "world's largest chocolate fountain", but this was removed from the final design.

The Tasmanian Government has committed up to $12 million to support the redevelopment, which is projected to attract more than 500,000 visitors annually and to create over 200 ongoing jobs once operational. The development application was lodged with Glenorchy City Council in mid-2025, with completion targeted for 2027.

== Production ==
Cadbury's Chocolate Factory chiefly produces chocolate blocks including Dairy Milk, Caramilk, Breakaway, Dream and Marvellous Creations varieties. The site also produces Caramello Koala and Freddo chocolate bars.

In 2022, a network of 56 dairy farms in North-West region of Tasmania contributes 130,000,000 litres (29,000,000 imp gal; 34,000,000 US gal) of milk to chocolate production, which is then processed at Cadbury's Burnie milk depot. The milk is then transported to Hobart in B-Double road tankers. Australian sugar is imported from Mackay, Queensland, with cocoa sourced and imported from Ghana.

Chocolate bars and seasonal products are produced at the Victorian Cadbury facilities at Ringwood and Scoresby. (Note: Cadbury's factory in Ringwood, Victoria was acquired in 1967 as part of the company's acquisition of MacRobertson's. Ringwood and a second Victorian factory in Scoresby are responsible for the production of Boost, Cherry Ripe, Crunchie, Flake, Picnic and Twirl chocolate bars. Ringwood also produces seasonal products, such as Easter Eggs, as well as boxed chocolates (Favourites, Milk Tray and Roses). Pascall confectionery has been manufactured in Victoria since 1981. Since the controversial 2019 closure of the historic Cadbury chocolate factory in Dunedin, the Victorian facilities now produce New Zealand Cadbury products including Chocolate Fish, the Mighty Perky Nana and Snifters exclusively for the New Zealand market.)

The factory production area includes Oceania, Southeast Asia, India, Japan, and Pakistan.

=== Sustainability ===
In April 2009, Cadbury Australia announced its commitment to Dairy Milk chocolate blocks achieving Fairtrade International certification by Easter 2010. When Cadbury was purchased by Mondelez International in 2010, the parent company was already devising its own internal sustainability programme, named Cocoa Life, which commenced in 2012. In 2016, Mondelez International discontinued Cadbury Dairy Milk's Fairtrade certification in favour for the Cocoa Life program. Labelling citing Fairtrade International had partnered with Mondelez International for the Cocoa Life program appeared on packaging, which also saw the removal of the International Fairtrade Certification Mark. 100% sustainable cocoa in Cadbury's Australian-made goods was achieved in 2021 due to the Cocoa Life programme.

In September 2022, Cadbury Australia announced that all future Dairy Milk varieties would be wrapped in 30% recycled soft plastic, replacing former single-use packaging. Packaging was further increased to 50% recycled soft plastic in the first quarter of 2024.

== Employment ==
Historically Cadbury's Claremont has been a major employer for the City of Glenorchy, employing 1,100 workers in 1960. The workforce has continually reduced through the ongoing advancement of manufacturing technology and automation. In 2015, 80 factory floor jobs were cut following a $75m upgrade by Mondelez International, with a further 11 jobs cut from the closure of the visitor centre. The workforce lost 40 workers in 2018 following a further $20m upgrade to machinery. In 2018, Cadbury's Claremont has a workforce of 450 people, in comparison to 2003, when it employed up to 850 people at peak times.

== Sponsorships ==
Cadbury's Claremont instigated the inaugural Cadbury Marathon in 1983. Covering a distance over 42 kilometres (26 mi), the long-distance event begins and terminates at the factory. The event celebrated its 40th year in 2023.

Cadbury are major sponsors of the Tasmania Football Club in the Australian Football League, and have also previously sponsored the Hobart Hurricanes cricket team in the Big Bash League.

== Access ==
Cadbury Road is accessible via Main Road, Box Hill Road and Bolton Street, Claremont. Metro Tasmania bus number 512 services Claremont and the Cadbury's Estate, which depart from the Hobart Bus Mall in the CBD.

== Incidents ==
In December 2024, a sewage discharge from the plant containing high concentrations of sugar caused the failure of the nearby Cameron Bay Sewage Treatment Plant. The high levels of sugar killed off bacteria in the plant that break down and treat waste, causing biological sewage treatment to be ineffective.

== See also ==
- Cadbury World
- Cadbury Ireland
- Cadbury chocolate factory, Toronto

== Sources ==
- Cadbury-Fry-Pascall Ltd (1920s). By Mountain and Sea: Claremont Works. Cadbury-Fry-Pascall Ltd.
