= Claremont, Tasmania =

Claremont
- Suburb
- Interactive map of Claremont
- Coordinates: 42°47′23″S 147°15′16″E
- Country: Australia
- State: Tasmania
- Region: South-east, Hobart
- City: Hobart
- LGA: City of Glenorchy (75%), Derwent Valley Council (25%)
- Location: 6 km (3.7 mi) N of Glenorchy

Government
  - State electorates: Clark; Lyons
  - Federal divisions: Clark; Lyons

Area
  - Total: 17.9 km^{2} (6.9 sq mi)

Population
  - Total: 8,397 (2021 census)
  - Density: 469.1/km^{2} (1,215/sq mi)
- Postcode: 7011
Suburbs around Claremont
Granton	Austins Ferry	River Derwent
Molesworth	Claremont	River Derwent
Chigwell	Berriedale	River Derwent

Claremont is a rural / residential locality in the local government areas (LGA) of Glenorchy (75%) and Derwent Valley (25%) in the Hobart and South-east LGA regions of Tasmania. The locality is about 6 kilometres (3.7 mi) north of the town of Glenorchy. The 2021 census recorded a population of 8,397 for the state suburb of Claremont.

== History ==
Claremont was gazetted as a locality in 1960. It is named after Claremont House, which was built in the 1830s by local settler Henry Bilton, who named it after one of the royal homes of England. Claremont was the home of an Army training facility during World War I, but this was moved to Brighton some time before World War II. At that time Claremont consisted of only a few houses and farms. Between the 1960s and the 1980s, public housing was built in the suburb (as happened in the rest of the City of Glenorchy).

== Cadbury's Estate ==
Following the completion of the newly constructed chocolate factory, the Cadbury's Estate was established at Claremont in 1922 as a means to facilitate housing for Cadbury factory workers. Based upon the model village of Cadbury's Bournville estate in Birmingham, the estate embodied the company's Quaker ideology, providing housing for workers, shops, sporting facilities, a school, a Friends meeting house and parkland, complete with purple benches. Bound by Bilton Bay to the north and Windermere Bay to the south upon the River Derwent, the 246-acre (100 ha) site, comprised the model village occupying 108 acres (44 ha) of the peninsula, the factory covering 41 acres (17 ha), recreational and shore reserves consisting of 58 acres (23 ha), and supporting infrastructure occupying a further 43 acres (17 ha).

Within the estate are various roads and buildings containing historical industry namesakes, such as Bournville Road, named after Cadbury's original worker's estate. MacRobertson’s Road pays tribute to MacRobertson's, the Australian company which created Cherry Ripe, Old Gold and Freddo Frog, acquired by Cadburys in 1967. Today, the Cadbury's Estate has a rich history with eighteen heritage-listed buildings located on the site, including the former Claremont Primary School.

== Geography ==
The River Derwent forms part of the eastern boundary.

== Infrastructure ==
=== Rail ===
Tasman Limited previously operated 26 weekday services along the North–South corridor until its closure in 1974. The former rail corridor has since been repurposed as a cycle track. Although Claremont Station has been demolished, several surrounding buildings including the Railway Crossing Operator’s cottage and the Station Master's house (constructed in 1915) survive along the rail corridor.

==== Cadbury's station ====
Cadbury's station was operational by September 1921. The spur line terminated directly outfront the chocolate factory within the Cadbury Estate.

==== Claremont Station ====
Claremont Station was constructed by the Tasmanian Government Railways in 1890. Following the closure of Tasman Limited passenger rail services in 1974, the station was demolished for the creation of the Claremont Village Shopping Centre.

=== Road ===
National Route 1 (Brooker Highway) runs through from north-east to south-east.

== Facilities ==
Claremont has a senior secondary college, two government primary schools (Windemere Primary School and Austins Ferry Primary School), and one private primary school (Holy Rosary School).

Claremont has a shopping centre named Claremont Plaza, and several churches. Claremont is home to a Retained Volunteer Fire Station whose members support career staff from Glenorchy Fire Station with fire incidents within the area. Sports teams include the Claremont Football Club, an Australian rules football team that plays in the Southern Football League, Claremont Cricket Club that plays in the Southern Cricket Association and Claremont Little Athletics Centre which caters to children between the ages of 4 and 15 all of who are based out of Abbotsfield Park along with Metro Claremont, a soccer team that plays in the Southern Premier League.

Claremont is also home to the Mount Faulkner Scout Group and the Claremont Guide Group.

== Gallery ==
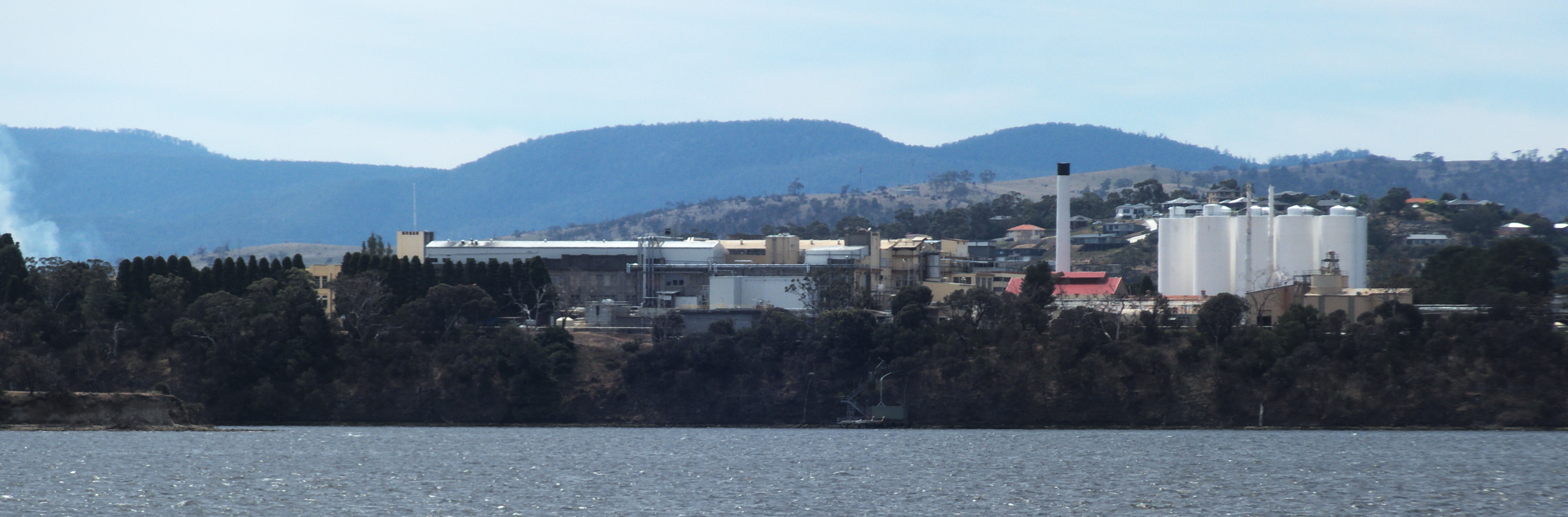
Cadbury's Claremont from Windermere Bay

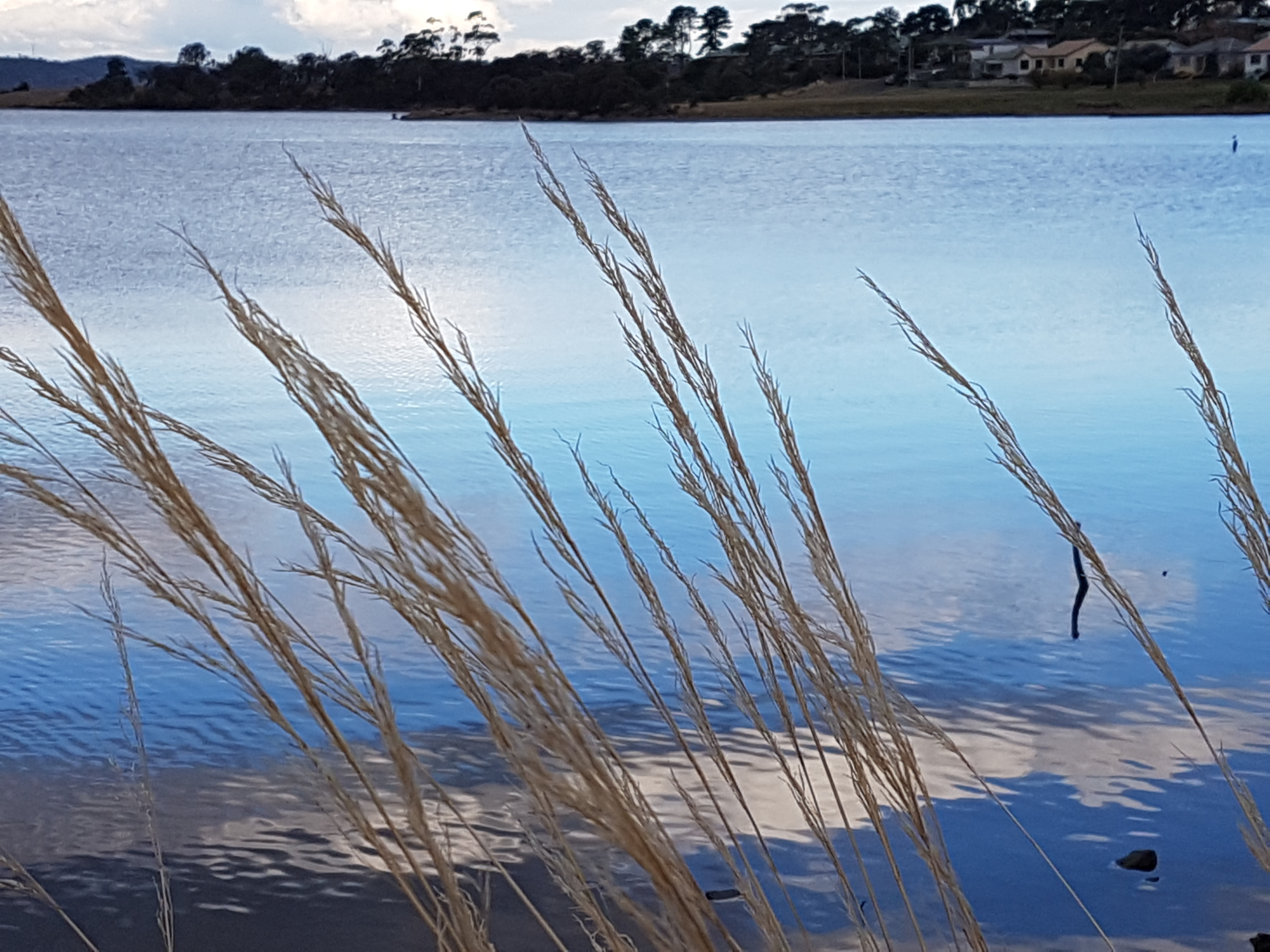
River Derwent, near Claremont
