= Macpherson Robertson =

Australian philanthropist (1859–1945)

Sir Macpherson Robertson KBE
- Sir Macpherson Robertson with the winners trophy for the MacRobertson Air Race
- Born: 6 September 1859; Ballarat, Victoria, Australia
- Died: 20 August 1945 (aged 85); Kew, Melbourne, Victoria
- Monuments: Mac. Robertson Land; Mac.Robertson Girls' High School; MacRobertson Bridge; MacRobertson International Croquet Shield; MacRobertson Miller Airlines (defunct)
- Occupations: Philanthropist; entrepreneur; confectioner
- Known for: MacRobertson's; Philanthropy
- Spouses: Elizabeth Alice Hedington (m. 1886–1932); Elizabeth Siebert (m. 1932–1944)

Sir Macpherson Robertson (Note: Known colloquially as "Mr Mac". The spelling of Macpherson is sometimes incorrectly represented as MacPherson, possibly attributed to the naming of his company as MacRobertson's Steam Confectionery Works.) KBE (6 September 1859 – 20 August 1945) was an Australian philanthropist, entrepreneur and founder of chocolate and confectionery company MacRobertson's. He was also known for bringing the United States inventions of chewing gum and cotton candy (Note: Known in Australia as fairy floss.) to Australia.

== Early life ==
Macpherson Robertson was born in Ballarat, Victoria, Australia. He was the eldest of seven children of Macpherson David Robertson, a Scottish carpenter born in Uruguay, and his Irish wife, Margaret (née Browne). The family came to Ballarat in search of gold but fell on hard times, with the father abandoning them and moving to Fiji. In 1869, his mother returned to Leith, in Scotland, together with Macpherson, his three siblings and another child on the way.

In Scotland, at the age of nine, Macpherson started working to support the family, eventually taking an apprenticeship with the Victoria Confectionery Co. In 1874, the family returned to Australia at the request of his father, then living in the Melbourne working class suburb of Fitzroy. Using skills he acquired in Scotland, in 1878, at the age of 19, Macpherson set up a confectionery manufacturing operation in the bathroom of the family home. He made confectionery on Mondays to Thursdays and sold them around Melbourne on Fridays and Saturdays.

== Business ==
His business quickly grew as "Mac Robertson Steam Confectionery Works". By the late 1880s the business employed thirty people. The company created numerous confections including Freddo Frog, Cherry Ripe, Old Gold Chocolates, Milk Kisses and Columbines. By 1900, it had become the largest confectionery works in Australia with agencies in every state. As part of his marketing strategy, Macpherson maintained a distinctive whiteness to everything he could – the buildings in the Fitzroy factory complex were all painted white and all of his several thousand employees wore white uniforms. Macpherson himself ensured he was always seen in public dressed immaculately in white and rode in a carriage behind two white ponies. The factory complex became known as "White City".

In 1967 MacRobertson's was acquired by English confectioner Cadbury's which in 1969 merged with Schweppes Australia to become Cadbury Schweppes. On 2 February 2010, Cadbury was purchased by Kraft Foods. Kraft Foods announced they would be splitting into two companies beginning on 1 October 2012. The confectionery business became Mondelez International, of which Cadbury is a subsidiary.

== Philanthropy and marketing ==
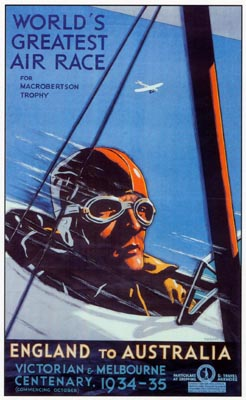
MacRobertson Air Race poster, 1934

Growth continued through innovative marketing and sponsorships as well as philanthropic donations:

- In 1913 he donated his property for use by the Fairfield Bowling, Tennis and Croquet Club.
- In 1921 he promoted a romanticised book of his enterprise entitled A Young Man and a Nail Can.
- In 1925 he presented a silver mounted shield to establish the MacRobertson International Croquet Shield. The event is now played every three or four years in rotation between England, Australia, New Zealand and the United States.
- In 1928 he sponsored the MacRobertson Expedition, a circuit of Australia in two Karrier trucks. The five-month expedition departed from Parliament House in Melbourne on 12 April and returned on 12 September 1928.
- In 1929 he financed a combined British, Australian and New Zealand Antarctic expedition. Sir Douglas Mawson named Mac. Robertson Land in his honour.
- In 1933 he contributed to the Melbourne centenary celebrations, including A£40,000 towards the establishment of the Mac.Robertson Girls' High School and was commemorated there with a bust he commissioned from August Rietmann. He contributed towards other public works projects as part of the centenary celebrations including the MacRobertson Bridge over the Yarra River at Grange Road, a fountain in front of the Melbourne Shrine of Remembrance and the herbarium in the Royal Botanic Gardens.
- In 1934 he co-founded Western Australian airline MacRobertson Miller Airlines (MMA) with pilot Horrie Miller. In the same year he sponsored the MacRobertson Air Race with a prize fund of $75,000, an air race from London to Melbourne.

== Honours ==
Robertson was appointed a Knight Bachelor on 3 June 1932, for services to Antarctic expeditions. On New Year's Day 1935, he was appointed a Knight Commander of the Order of the British Empire (KBE), for philanthropic services in Victoria.

In 1931, he was elected as a Fellow of the Royal Geographical Society, in London.
