= Mac Robertson =

Mac Robertson may refer to:

- Macpherson Robertson
- Mac. Robertson Land
- Mac.Robertson Girls' High School
- MacRobertson Air Race

== See also ==
- MacRobertson's
