= The MacRobertson Expedition 1928 =

The MacRoberston Expedition was the first motorised expedition to travel around the Australian mainland, completing the five month journey between 12 April and 12 September 1928.

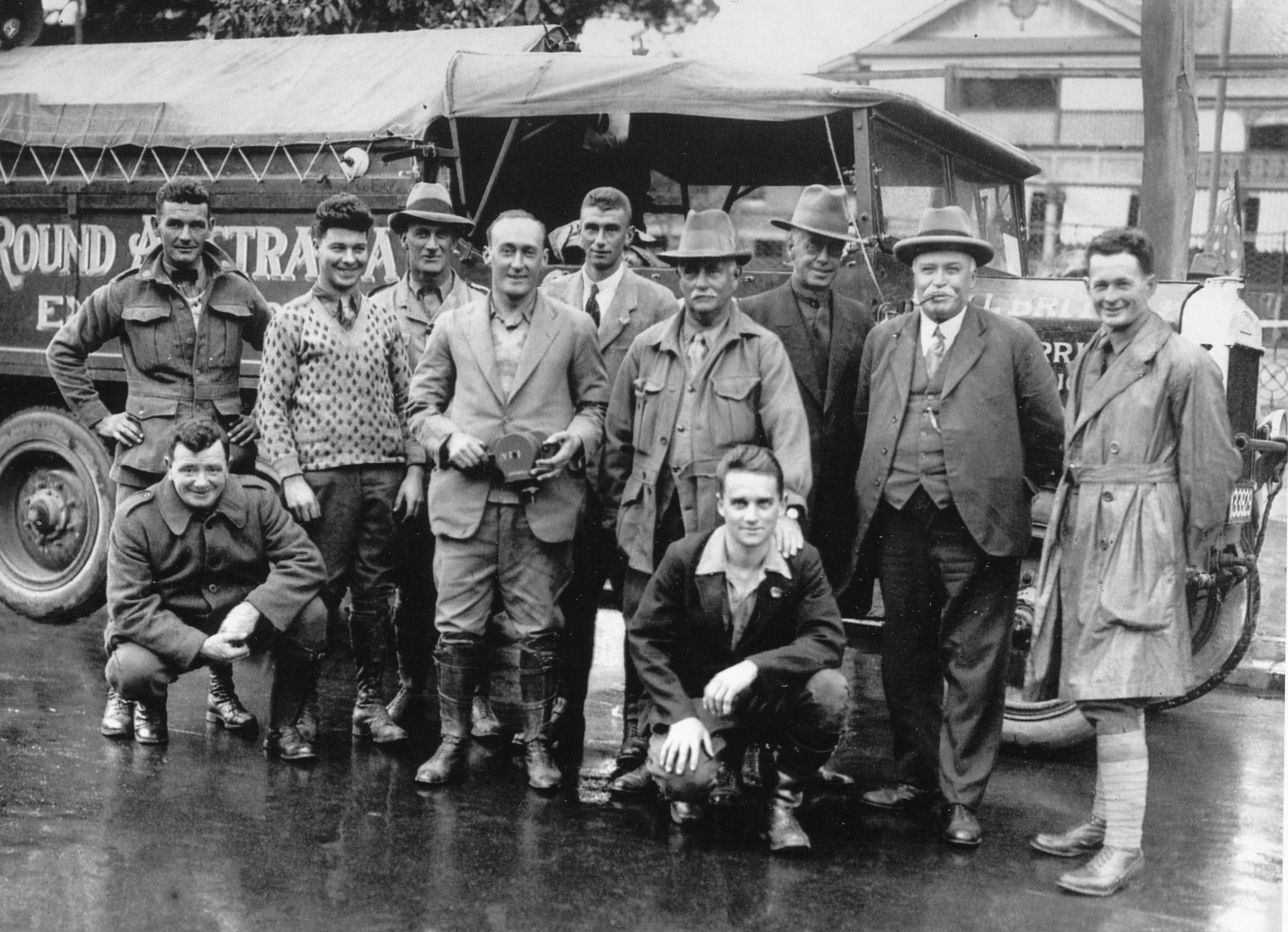
Members of the Expedition prior to departure from Melbourne, 1928.

The expedition was sponsored by Macpherson Robertson, a prominent Victorian industrialist and founder of MacRobertson Confectionery Company. The theme was to demonstrate the ability of new technology to bridge Australia’s great distances; powerful six wheeled trucks to traverse the road-less outback, wireless radio for transmitting progress reports, cinema projectors to screen footage of their journey in the towns visited along the route and a de Havilland aircraft to maintain contact with the ground party.

MacRoberston was a flamboyant, self-made businessman and philanthropist. After the MacRobertson Expedition, he funded Douglas Mawson’s expedition to the South Pole in 1930-1931 and the London to Melbourne Air Race in 1934.

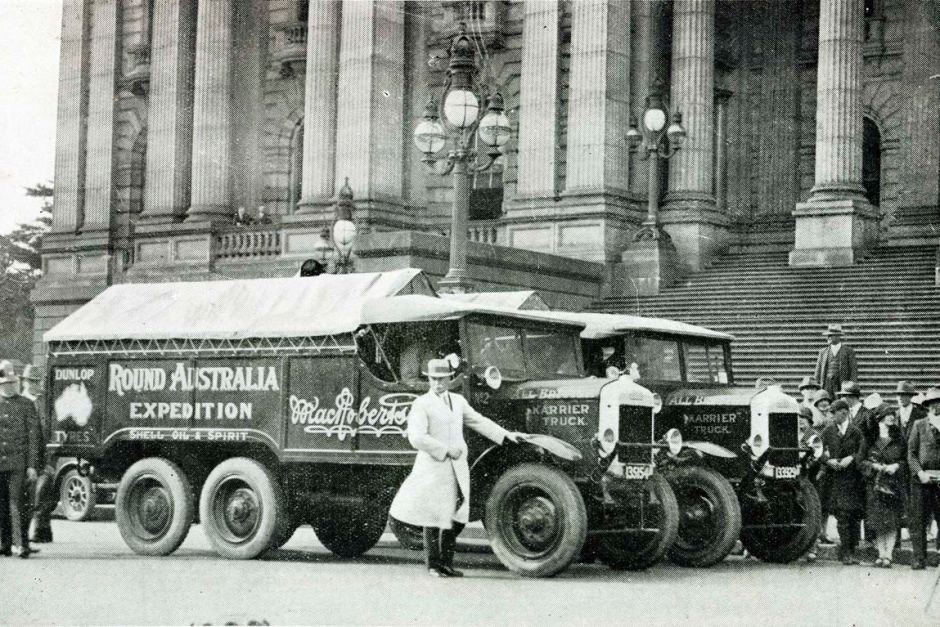
MacRobertson in his trademark white coat stands in front of the Karrier trucks outside Parliament House Melbourne, prior to the Expedition's departure, 12 April 1928.

Other expedition sponsors included Shell Oil, Dunlop Tires, Amalgamated Wireless and Exide Batteries.

Twelve men travelled approximately 13,000 km in two seven ton Karrier trucks, christened ‘Burke’ and ‘Wills’, and an Oldsmobile touring car. The expedition leader was William Dunkerley, a refrigeration engineer from Melbourne. Also accompanying the tour was William’s son Archie Dunkerley; a representative of Shell Oil and the expedition photographer. Archie had broken the Darwin to Melbourne driving record the previous year, completing the trip in 7 days, 16 hours and 34 minutes in the Oldsmobile that the MacRobertson Expedition took with them in 1928. Other members included an accountant, a mechanic, a wool classer, a cattle buyer, a surveyor, a wireless operator and a cook.

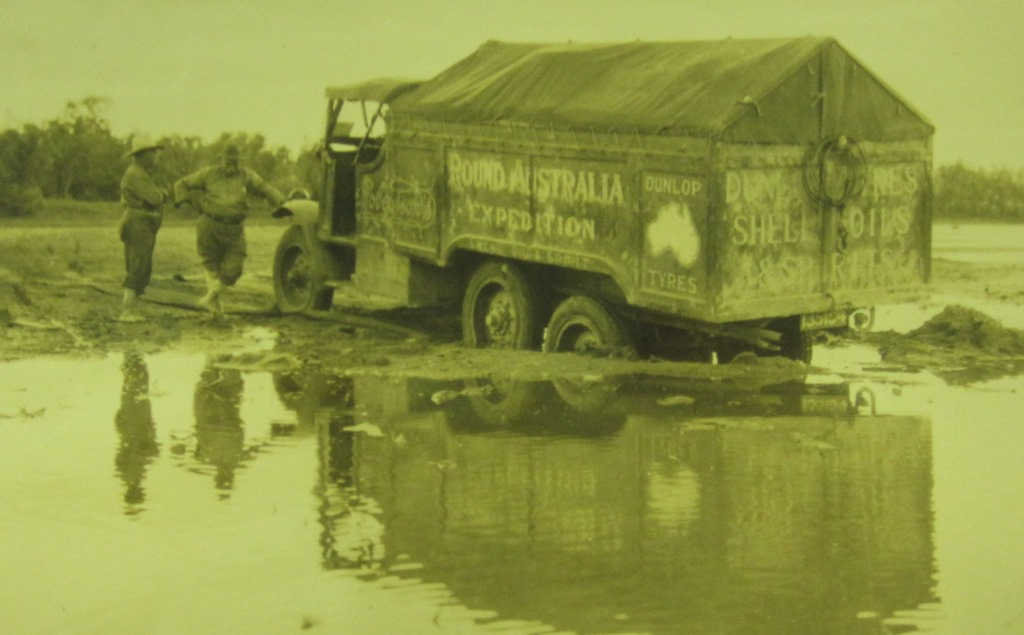
Somewhere in northern Australia, one of the trucks is bogged again.

The expedition started and finished at Parliament House in Melbourne, with the route taken passing through Bendigo, Adelaide, Port Augusta, Kalgoorlie, Perth, Geraldton, Port Hedland, Broome, Wyndham, Darwin, Camooweal, Townsville and then down the East coast.

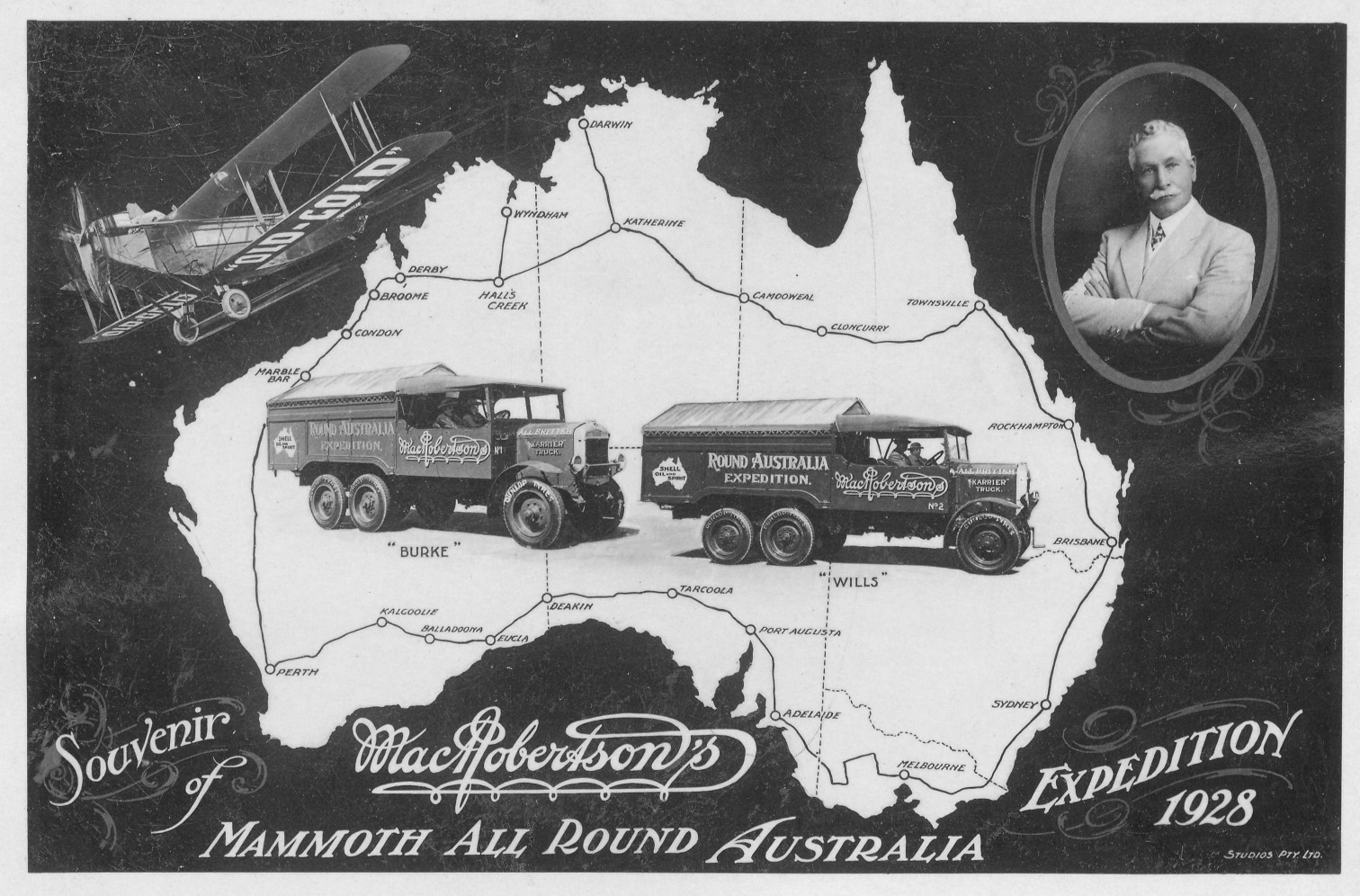
A postcard from 1928 showing the route of the MacRobertson Expedition, MacRobertson himself, the Karrier trucks, and the de Havilland aircraft that accompanied the tour.
