= Cadbury Fingers =

Chocolate biscuit

Fingers

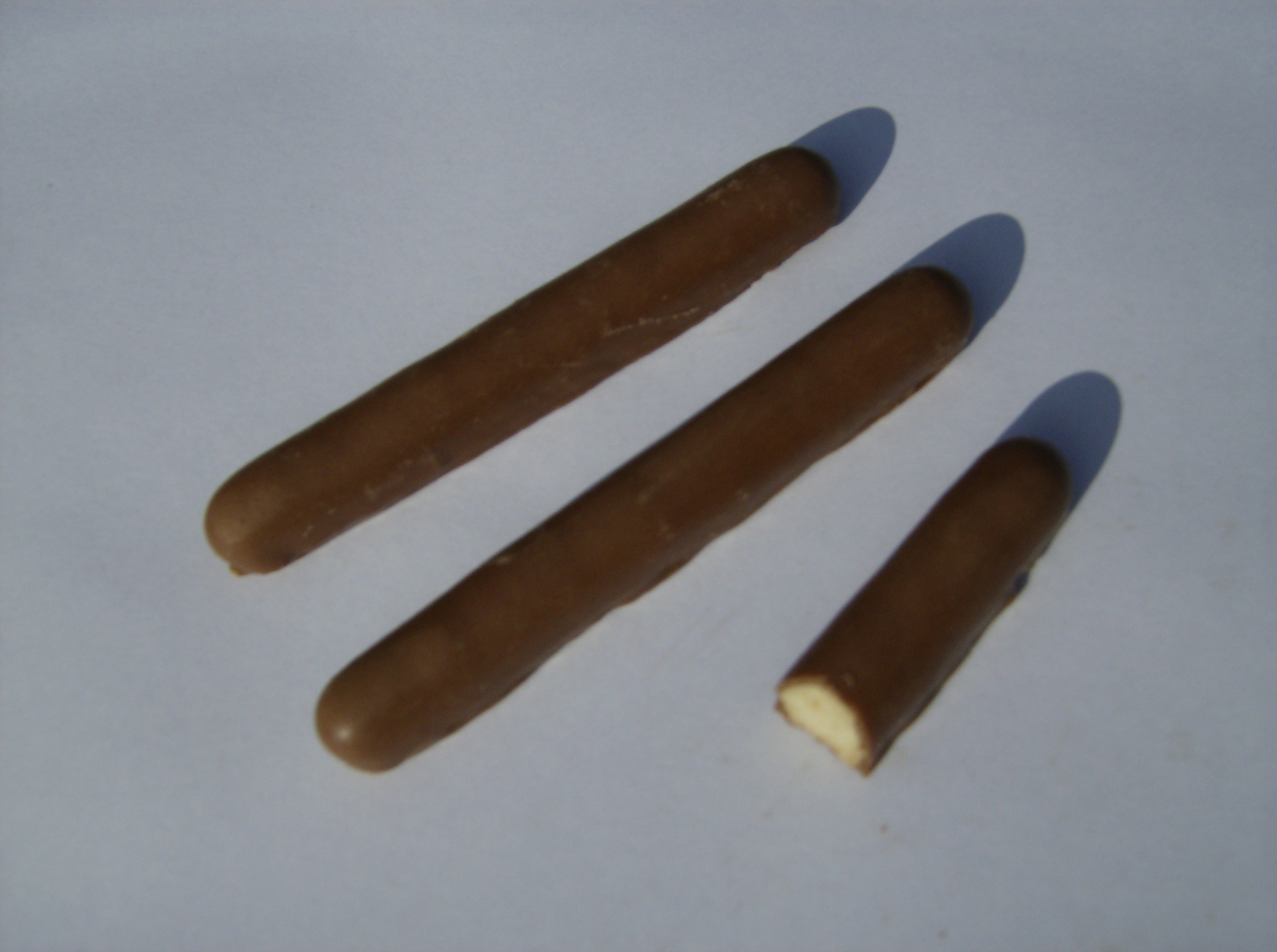
- Product type: Biscuit
- Current owner: Cadbury
- Country: United Kingdom
- Introduced: 1897; 129 years ago
- Related brands: List of Cadbury products
- Markets: World
- Website: cadbury.co.uk/fingers

Cadbury Fingers, Cadbury Chocolate Fingers, or simply Fingers are a popular chocolate biscuit in the United Kingdom and Ireland which consist of a rod-shaped biscuit centre covered in chocolate. Fingers are produced at Burton's Biscuit Company in the United Kingdom and sold by Cadbury UK, and are distributed in markets around the world, including North and South America, Europe and Asia. Since March 2013, Cadbury Fingers have also been sold in Australia, with three different varieties available.

Fingers are sold in rectangular boxes contained in a compartmented plastic tray sealed in cellophane. Double size boxes holding two trays are also available. Promotional boxes containing three trays are also available at times. Boxes contain an average of 24 fingers.

The modern style of Cadbury Fingers was launched in 1951. However, a similar biscuit was first introduced in 1897 as part of a Cadbury biscuit assortment. As of late 2012, the Cadbury Fingers brand is worth £40 million and is the number one brand in the special treats biscuit sector.

Each finger contains 30 calories, 1.5 g of fat and 3.4 g of carbohydrates. Cadbury describes one serving as consisting of four fingers.

== Varieties ==
Cadbury Fingers are available in four flavours; white chocolate, dark chocolate, orange chocolate and triple chocolate (Fabulous Fingers), and are made in the following varieties

- Cadbury Dairy Milk Fingers (originally as Cadbury Fingers)
- Cadbury Orange Fingers (launched 2002, discontinued 2005, relaunched 2020)
- Cadbury Mint Fingers (launched 2021)
- Cadbury Fingers Caramel (launched 2002, discontinued in 2006)
- Cadbury Fingers Salted Caramel (launched 2023)
- Cadbury Fingers Toffee Crunch (launched 2008, discontinued in 2013)
- Cadbury Fingers Double Chocolate (launched 2009, discontinued in 2016)
- Cadbury White Fingers (launched as Cadbury Dream Fingers in 2010, renamed to White Chocolate Fingers in 2013)
- Cadbury Bournville Fingers (launched in 1998 discontinued in 2000s, relaunched 2010 and relaunched in 2020 and discontinued in 2025)
- Cadbury Fabulous Fingers (launched 2011) (renamed as Cadbury Triple Chocolate Fingers in 2021, discontinued in 2023)
- Cadbury Honeycomb Fabulous Fingers (launched in 2013, discontinued in 2018)
- Cadbury Praline Fabulous Fingers (launched in 2013, discontinued in 2016)
- Cadbury Mini Fingers (came in multiple bags)
- Cadbury Toffee Crunch Mini Fingers (discontinued in 2014)
- Cadbury Nibbly Fingers (launched in 2018, originally as Cadbury Mini Fingers Sharing pack)
- Cadbury White and Milk Chocolate Fingers (limited during late Autumn to Early Winter as Cadbury Snowy Fingers)

Cadbury Snack Fingers were available in the late 1970s and early 1980s for a few years.

Australian varieties:

- Cadbury Fingers Milk Chocolate
- Cadbury Fingers Chocolate
- Cadbury Fingers Honeycomb

Fabulous Fingers, the first sub-brand under the Cadbury Fingers brand, was launched in November 2011 with a £2m campaign.

== Advertising ==
In the 1990s, Cadbury released separate adverts in which Michael Barrymore and Barry Humphries performing as Dame Edna Everage. Eeach appeared alone, singing about Cadbury Fingers and emphasising their Cadbury Dairy Milk coating.

During the Early to Mid 2000s, The adverts feature the Main Characteristics Thumb who wanted to avoid anyone eating Cadbury's fingers, but this is always an unsuccessful plan. It has the slogan 'It's a finger thing' and it was sponsored by Channel 5 during the movie premiere until 2005. It also came with a sticker of a face to put on the Thumb.

In late 2006, older packaging was rebranded as simple and has a display with the slogan 'one may lead to another' along with the Glass and a half, and it shows that all the fingers fall from each order to another.

In October 2010, a new advertising campaign was launched and £4 million was invested in the brand as a result. It featured the Main Fingers puppets celebrating good times in several settings, including music concerts and sporting events, which tells about their outstanding skills.
