= Cherry Ripe (chocolate bar) =

Australian chocolate bar

- Product type: Confectionery
- Current owner: Cadbury Enterprises Pte Limited
- Country: Australia
- Introduced: 1924; 102 years ago
- Related brands: List of Cadbury products
- Markets: Australia, New Zealand
- Previous owners: MacRobertson's
- Registered as a trademark in: Australia 1941, 1949, 1952 and 2003
- Tagline: The Big Cherry Taste
- Website: Product website

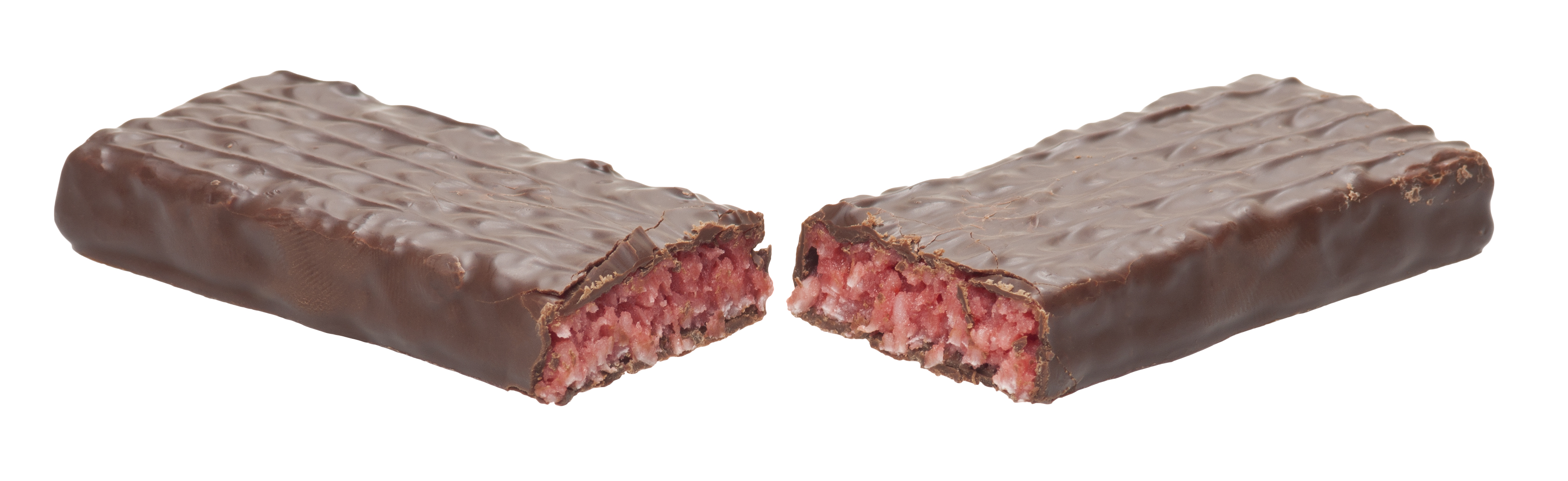
A split Cherry Ripe

Cherry Ripe is a brand of chocolate bar manufactured by Cadbury Australia. Introduced by the Australian confectioner MacRobertson's in 1924, it is now one of Australia's oldest chocolate bars and is one of the top chocolate bar brands sold in the country. It consists of cherries and coconut coated with dark chocolate.

== History ==
After Cadbury acquired Australian confectioner MacRobertson's in 1967, it continued to manufacture Cherry Ripe, along with Freddo, Old Gold and Snack. Cherry Ripe wrappers continued to display the former company's distinctive logo until 2002.

== Variations ==
Cherry Ripes are available in two flavours, original and double dipped, but have previously been produced in the following special and limited edition flavours and versions:

- The Lord of The Rings: The Two Towers Cadbury Promotional Cherry Ripe (Special Edition, launched 2002)
- Cadbury Cherry Ripe Cherry Roll (Limited Edition, launched 2010)
- Cadbury Cherry Ripe Dark Cherry (Limited Edition, launched 2011)
- Cadbury Cherry Ripe Double Dipped (Launched as a limited edition in 2012, relaunched in 2015 as a permanent flavour)
- Cadbury Valentines Day Promotional Cherry Ripe (Special Edition, launched 2013)
- Cadbury Cherry Ripe Burst (Limited Edition, launched 2013)
- Cadbury Cherry Ripe Dark Ganache (Limited Edition, launched 2014)
- Cadbury Cherry Ripe In A Block (Limited Edition, launched 2014)
- Cadbury Cherry Ripe Berry Truffle (Limited Edition, launched 2024)
- Cadbury Monopoly Promotional Cherry Ripe (Special Edition, launched 2026)

== See also ==
- List of cherry dishes
- List of confectionery brands
