= August Rietmann =

Swiss-born Australian monumental mason, potter and sculptor active from 1917

August Rietmann (1877–1951) was a Swiss-born Australian monumental mason, potter and sculptor also known as August Rietman.

== Biography ==
August Walter Rietmann was born in Lustdorf, Bezirk Frauenfeld, Thurgau, Switzerland, on 8 June 1877 to parents Walt and Karolina (née Gutterer) and was baptised a Lutheran. He married Maria Frieda Ölschläger (1878–1942) of Baden Baden, Germany on 6 August 1910. After five years and during WW1 he and wife Frieda migrated on 8 August 1915 to Melbourne, sailing on the S.S. Osterley from Marseille.

In 1917 they leased Box Cottage, Ormond previously occupied by market gardeners William and Elizabeth Box, residents there from 1868–1913. There they raised two children, Stefanie (1918–2006) and William (1920–1997). In 1935 Rietmann purchased the property and the family used the Cottage during the day and slept in the Front House. He applied for naturalisation as an Australian citizen in October 1939.

== Sculptor ==
From the date of his arrival Rietmann was employed at monumental masons Corbens Ltd. at 634 Smith St., Clifton Hill, where after WW1 he carved up to twelve war memorials, including those at Coleraine and Bonnie Doon, and most likely those of Clunes (1920), Boort (1921), Inglewood and St Arnaud which have been credited to Corbens Ltd. as well as others still unknown, and it is speculated that his migration was invited or sponsored by them. The dropping of the second ‘n’ in his surname would have been a response to wartime anti-German sentiment. It is likely that Rietmann was the carver of most Corbens Ltd. 'Digger' statues. During the 1920s August set up his own business producing pressed cement plant pots, columns, paving slabs and street lamp standards, some of which were installed in St Kilda Road, as well as headstones and figures. In 1922 Rietmann was commissioned by Sir MacPherson Robertson, confectionery manufacturer, for a bust which was installed at Mac Robertson Girls High School for which Robertson had provided £40,000 building funds. During the 1930s Depression Rietmann took on apprentices. He left Corbens and was contracted for his services by fine artists including Paul Mountford whose design for the memorial at Stonnington (Malvern) Town Hall Rietmann carved in 1930. At Box Cottage he built a workshop in the Barn and used the Cottage for plaster moulding.

== Legacy ==
Son William joined the business and the family continued to use the site after August died on 16 November 1951. William moved Rietmann Landscaping Ltd to Bay Road Highett in 1953 and later to Carrum. The land, containing the Box Cottage, was sold to Lewis Timber Pty Ltd in 1970 who approached Moorabbin City Council to preserve the heritage Cottage. Subsequently in 1984 the Cottage was dismantled and reconstructed in the adjacent Joyce Park where it serves as a museum. Rietmann is buried at Cheltenham Memorial Park with his wife Frieda who died on 22 July 1942.

Rietmann's sculpture was the subject of research by Frances Bader funded by Museums Australia Inc. (Victoria)'s Roving Curator Program grant in 2016 which resulted in a display at Box Cottage for the City of Moorabbin Historical Society; August Rietman 1877-1951: Monument Carver, WW1 Memorials, Artisan, Sculptor.
