= Cadbury Snack =

Chocolate-covered biscuit snack

Cadbury Snack

Snack Sandwich

A Cadbury Snack was a shortcake biscuit square or two biscuits with chocolate filling, covered with milk chocolate.

== History ==
Two versions of Cadbury Snack are available in the United Kingdom and Ireland: Snack Shortcake (chocolate-coated shortbread in a yellow wrapper), and Snack Sandwich, an individual chocolate-and-biscuit bar similar to the original Jacob's Club biscuit.

Until the mid 80s (UK) and 2015 (Ireland) there was also Snack Wafer (chocolate-covered wafer fingers in a pink wrapper), Cadbury announced that it was ceasing production of the Snack Wafer in Ireland due to declining sales.

During the 1970s there was a Cadbury Snack Finger (chocolate-covered fingers in a blue wrapper) see Cadbury Fingers & in the 2000s there were limited editions of other versions of Snack.

== Advertising ==
During the 1950s and 1960s there were black-and-white television adverts for the Snack product. Colour ads appeared in the 1970s. In 1986 the television advert used the phrase "Bridge the Gap". There were cartoon adverts in the 1990s.

== Australian version ==
In Australia, the Cadbury Dairy Milk Snack block is a six-piece bar of milk chocolate filled with six different flavours (strawberry, pineapple, orange, coconut ice, Turkish delight and caramel), with each square piece having a different shape corresponding to its flavour, and available in 135-gram (4.8 oz) and 200-gram (7.1 oz) sizes. It began production in 1974; before then, the chocolate was created by MacRobertson's. In June 2009, Cadbury reduced the size of the bars.
