= Caramello Koala =

Chocolate bar

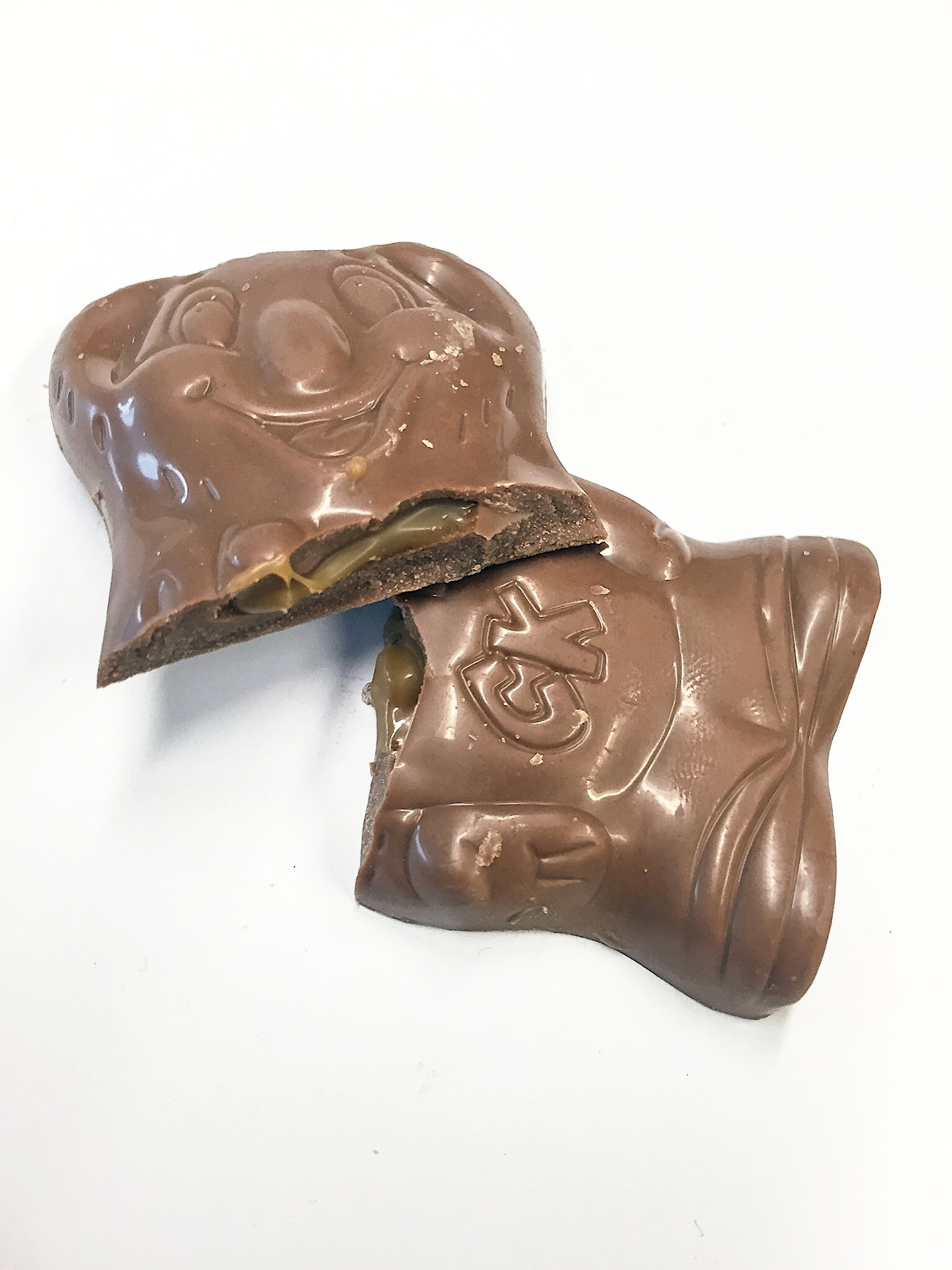
- A Cadbury's Caramello Koala split in half
- Product type: Confectionery
- Current owner: Cadbury Australia
- Country: Australia and United Kingdom
- Introduced: 1966; 60 years ago
- Markets: Australia and United Kingdom
- Website: Cadbury’s Caramello Koala

Caramello Koala is a brand of chocolate treat currently manufactured by Cadbury Australia. It consists of a chocolate cartoon koala (named "George" in certain advertising material) with a caramel centre.

The chocolate bar is sold in two sizes: the more common 15 g (0.53 oz) size and the "Giant" 35 g (1.2 oz) size, usually sold as a fundraiser. 50 million Caramello Koalas are sold in Australia each year, making the product the second most popular in the Australian children's confectionery market, after the Freddo Frog.

Cross-over products are occasionally made available featuring the Caramello character, including Cadbury Caramello Koala Choc Caramel flavoured milk in 2003 and Caramello Koala Sundae ice-cream in 1997. They were also sold in South Africa under the name "Caramello Bear", where they were marketed with the Caramello Bear admitting: "Caramel? That's a weakness!", but they were discontinued in 2012. The Afrikaans slogan for the Caramello Bear in South Africa was "Met 'n magie propvol caramel", which translates to "with a tummy full of caramel".

A 20g Caramello Koala contains 415 kJ (99.1874 kcal) of energy and 5.5 g (0.19 oz) of fat.

Caramello Koala was introduced in Australia in 1966. It was reputedly the first mass-marketed confection to be modelled on Australian fauna. Television advertisements for the chocolate in Australia featured Caramello and his cartoon friends sailing down a river or riding on a steam train to a modified version of Donovan's "Mellow Yellow". Caramello's packaging and imagery was updated in 2000, after market research revealed the character was seen as daggy (outdated), one-dimensional and not sufficiently 'animated'.

In 2003, then Australian Labor Party MP, Mark Latham, was labelled a "Caramello Koala" by Liberal MP Christopher Pyne, for allegedly being "soft in the centre".

To deal with rising input costs, in April 2015 Cadbury announced a reduction in size of the 20 g (0.71 oz) chocolate to 15 g (0.53 oz). Despite the 25% size reduction, the price is unchanged. The giant Caramello Koala has also been reduced from 40 g (1.4 oz) to 35 g (1.2 oz).

== See also ==
- Freddo
- List of chocolate bar brands
