= MacRobertson's =

Australian company

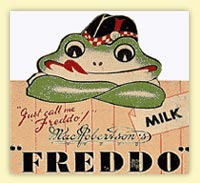
- 1930s Freddo advertisement with the distinctive MacRobertson's signature logo
- Country: Fitzroy, Victoria, Australia
- Introduced: 1880; 146 years ago
- Discontinued: 1967; 59 years ago (purchased by Cadbury-Fry-Pascall)
- Founded: 1880
- Founder: Sir Macpherson Robertson KBE
- Products: Freddo frogs; Old Gold; Snack; Cherry Ripe

MacRobertson's, officially the MacRobertson's Steam Confectionery Works, was an Australian company that produced chocolates and various other confectionery. Some of its historical brands exist today, most notably Freddo frogs, Old Gold, Snack, and Cherry Ripe, all owned by Cadbury Australia.

== History ==
The company was founded in 1880 by Sir Macpherson Robertson and takes its name as a portmanteau of his first and last name. The company was based for over 100 years in Fitzroy, Victoria, but later moved to Ringwood, Victoria. The company also became known for introducing chewing gum and fairy floss to Australia.

Macpherson Robertson died in 1945 and in 1967, his heirs sold the company to Cadbury-Fry-Pascall, the Australian arm of the British confectioner, which in 1971 merged with Schweppes Australia to become Cadbury Schweppes Australia. The newly merged company continued to manufacture many of the former company's products including: Freddo, Old Gold, Snack, Columbines and Cherry Ripe; which continued to display the company's distinctive logo on its wrapper until 2002. In 2009, Cadbury Schweppes separated from its beverage business and became Cadbury Australia, which continues to operate the former company's factory in Ringwood.
