= Freddo =

Chocolate bar brand

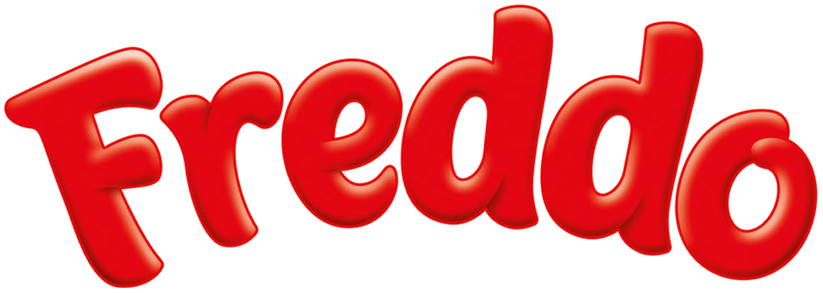

- Two Freddo frogs
- Product type: Confectionery
- Current owner: Cadbury
- Country: Australia
- Introduced: 1930; 96 years ago
- Related brands: List of Cadbury brands
- Previous owners: MacRobertson's
- Website: cadbury.co.uk/freddo

Freddo is a chocolate bar brand shaped like an anthropomorphic cartoon frog. It was originally manufactured by the now defunct company MacRobertson's, an Australian confectionery company, but is now produced by Cadbury. Some of the more popular flavours include strawberry, pineapple and peppermint.

The product was invented in 1930 by Harry Melbourne, an 18-year-old MacRobertson's employee. In 1967, MacRobertson's was sold to Cadbury, which incorporated Freddo Frogs into its own product range. The chocolate was originally sold only in Australia, but has been introduced into several other markets.

== History ==
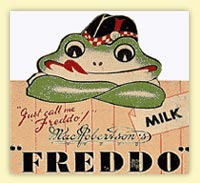
1930 Freddo advertisement

In 1930, the MacRobertson's chocolate company were looking to add a new product to their children's range. Initial designs for a chocolate mouse were rejected, as Harry Melbourne felt that women and children were afraid of mice and would dislike the product. It was instead decided to produce a chocolate frog, branded as "Freddo Frog". There were four varieties available: milk chocolate, white chocolate, half milk/half white, and milk chocolate with peanuts.

Freddo bars were introduced to the UK market in 1973, turning over £2 million a year by 1974, before being withdrawn in 1979. They were re-launched in 1994 after 15 years.

In 2009, the Freddo chocolate was redesigned in the United Kingdom, featuring a new, glossier Freddo design, and a replacement Dairy Milk logo. The same year saw the launch of an online animated series on the product's website.

In June 2006, a scare over possible salmonella contamination in some Cadbury products in the UK led to the recall of around a million Cadbury chocolate bars, including the standard Freddo. As a result of the contamination, Cadbury was fined £1 million, and ordered to pay an additional £152,000 in costs.

== Economics ==
In the United Kingdom, the price of Freddo is informally used to measure the cost of living and inflation rates, with each generation comparing a different price. The original Freddo bars were 2p when they were launched in the UK in 1973, but they were withdrawn in 1979.

When the Freddo bar was relaunched in the 1990s, it was priced at 10p. The price of a Freddo remained at 10p until 2005, since when the price of a Freddo bar has roughly increased in price by 2p a year, with the 2016 selling price being 25p. In 2017, the price of Freddos increased to 30p, double the price adjusted for inflation (15p), compared to its launch price (10p). This led to public criticism and outrage across social media platforms. For one week in January 2019, the British supermarket Tesco reduced the price of Freddo to the nostalgic price of 10p as part of their centenary celebrations. The price of a Freddo in 2022 was as much as 49p. In October 2024, Labour MP Patrick Hurley launched a campaign to reduce the price of the Freddo as a way to engage young people in politics and discussions about the cost of living crisis.

== See also ==
- List of chocolate bar brands
- Caramello Koala
- Chocolate Frog (Harry Potter)
- Crunchy Frog
