= Cadbury Old Gold =

Brand of dark chocolate by Cadbury

Old Gold
- Product type: Confectionery
- Current owner: Cadbury
- Introduced: 1916; 110 years ago
- Related brands: List of Cadbury products
- Previous owners: MacRobertson
- Website: www.cadbury.com.au/brand/cadbury-brand-old-gold/

Old Gold is a brand of dark chocolate in Australia dating back to 1916, now made by Cadbury.

Blocks of the chocolate are produced in "Original" (45% cocoa solids), "Old Jamaica" (Rum & Raisin), ""Roast Almond", "70% Cocoa" and "Peppermint" varieties.

The "Old Gold" brand was established by confectionery company MacRobertson's.

Following the acquisition of MacRobertson’s by Cadbury in the mid-20th century, Old Gold became part of Cadbury’s broader range of chocolate products. This transition integrated the brand into an international confectionery business that had originated in the 19th century in the United Kingdom and had expanded globally through mergers and overseas production facilities.
