= Quality Street =

Quality Street can refer to:

- Quality Street (play), a play by J. M. Barrie
- Quality Street (1927 film), a 1927 film based on the play starring Marion Davies
- Quality Street (1937 film), a 1937 film based on the play, starring Katharine Hepburn
- Quality Street (confectionery), now manufactured by Nestlé
- Quality Street, a 1991 album by English indie band World of Twist
- Quality Street: A Seasonal Selection for All the Family, a 2013 album by English singer-songwriter Nick Lowe
- The Quality Street Gang, a criminal gang in Manchester, England, in the 1960s and 1970s
- A street in the village of Merstham
- A street in Davidson's Mains, Edinburgh
- A street in Leith, Edinburgh
- A Street in North Berwick, East Lothian
