= Rowntree Mackintosh Confectionery =

Former English confectionery company

Rowntree Mackintosh plc
- Company type: Joint Venture
- Industry: Confectionery
- Predecessors: Rowntree Co.; Mackintosh Co.
- Founded: 1969; 57 years ago
- Defunct: 1988; 38 years ago
- Fate: Acquired by, and merged with Nestlé
- Successor: Nestlé
- Headquarters: York, England
- Products: Chocolate bars, toffee, candies
- Brands: Aero; Kit Kat
- Subsidiaries: Gale's; Hoadley's; Hot Sam Pretzels; Menier; Laura Secord; Tom's Foods

Rowntree Mackintosh plc (/ˈraʊntriː ˈmækɪntɒʃ/ ROWN-tree MAH-kin-taw-sh), trading as Rowntree Mackintosh Confectionery, was an English confectionery company based in York, England. It was formed by the merger of Rowntree's and John Mackintosh Co. The company was famous for making chocolate brands, such as Kit Kat, Aero and Quality Street. It was purchased by Nestlé in 1988, with products rebranded under its own brand.

Rowntree Mackintosh Confectionery owned Mackintosh's former Halifax headquarters and factory. The factory is still in use, located next to Halifax railway station, for production of Quality Street and other confections.

The former Rowntree's factory and headquarters were in York. Nestlé still operates in York with one of the world's largest confectionery factories and a global research centre for confectionery base.

== History ==
=== Background ===
In 1862, Rowntree's was founded at Castlegate, in York by Henry Isaac Rowntree, as the company manager bought out the Tuke family. In 1864 Rowntree acquired an old iron foundry at Tanner's Moat for £1,000, and moved production there. In 1869 the factory was staffed by 12 men. By 1869 Rowntree was in financial difficulties and his brother, Joseph Rowntree, joined him in full partnership, and H. I. Rowntree & Co was formally established.

Rowntree had struggled to make a milk chocolate product of comparable quality or value to Cadbury's Dairy Milk. In 1927, the company began to market its fruit gums, and its pastilles from 1928, in the now familiar tube packaging.

Rowntree entered the continental Europe market in the 1960s, establishing production facilities in Hamburg, Dijon, Elst and Noisiel. After Eights were launched in 1962.

In 1969, the Rowntree board rejected a £37 million takeover bid from General Foods. That same year, Rowntree entered into a long-term agreement with Hershey whereby Hershey would produce Rowntree products under license in the US. Rowntree merged with John Mackintosh and Co in 1969, to become Rowntree Mackintosh. Mackintosh produced Rolo, Munchies, Caramac and Quality Street.

=== Formation of Rowntree Mackintosh ===
In 1969, Rowntree's merged with John Mackintosh and Sons Ltd. to form "Rowntree Mackintosh plc" The company signed a long-time agreement with Hershey Foods Corporation to market and even produce some of its products in the U.S., starting with Kit Kat. The following year, the company expanded opening plants in Castleford and Leicester. In 1971, French business "Chocolate-Menier SA" joined the group. The company released its own newspaper, Rowntree Mackintosh News, with a circulation of 26,000 copies.

The Yorkie and Lion chocolate bars were introduced in 1976. In 1978 the Hershey contract was renegotiated, giving Hershey the rights to the Kit Kat and Rolo brands in the US in perpetuity.

Kenneth Dixon was appointed as chairman and chief executive in 1981. Between 1981 and 1987, Rowntree invested nearly £400 million in upgrading its manufacturing facilities and developing high volume, product dedicated equipment for several of the company's brands, including Kit Kat, After Eights and Smarties.

Between 1983 and 1987, Rowntree spent nearly £400 million on acquisitions, including Tom's Foods for £138 million (1983), Laura Secord Chocolates for £19 million (1983), Hot Sam Pretzels for £14 million (1986), the Sunmark confectionery business in the US for £156 million (1986) and Gale's honey for £11 million (1986). They also bought Scunthorpe snack maker Sooner Snacks in 1982, known for inventing Nik Naks and for making Murphy's Crisps, Seyshells and Wheat Crunchies.

Between 1982 and 1987, the number of UK staff was reduced from 19,700 to 15,600.

In 1987 Rowntree operated 25 factories in nine countries and employed 33,000 people, including close to 16,000 in its eight UK operations. Group turnover was £1.4 billion, with the UK and Ireland accounting for 40 per cent of the total.

=== Purchase by Nestle ===
In 1988, Swiss company Nestlé purchased Rowntree Mackintosh Confectionery for $4.5 billion. The business was branded Nestlé Rowntree until 1991, when it formally became Nestlé UK.
