= Munchies (confectionery) =

Confectionery brand of Nestlé

Nestle Munchies

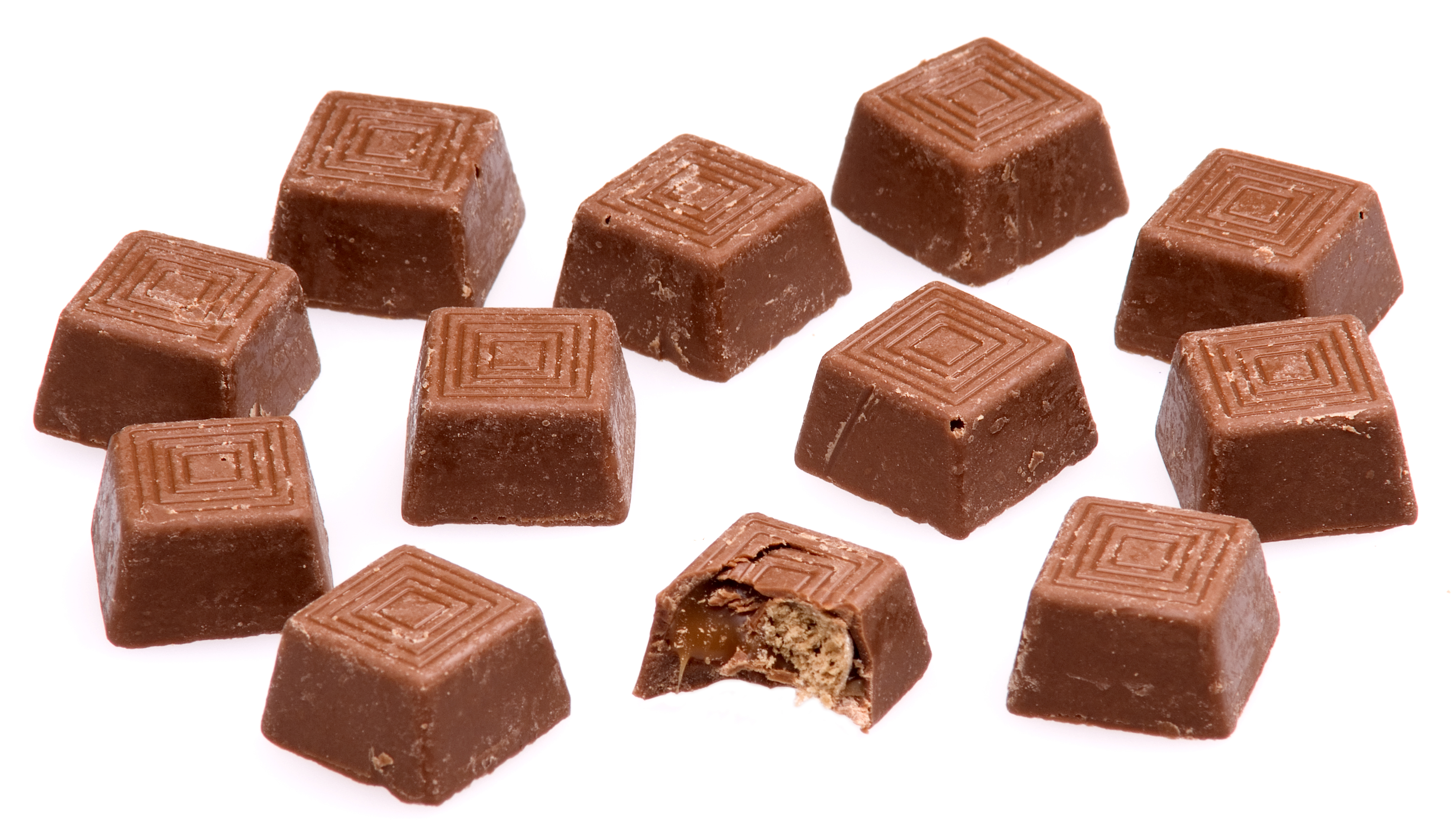
- Product type: Confection
- Current owner: Nestlé
- Country: U.K.
- Introduced: 1957; 69 years ago
- Previous owners: Mackintosh's
- Website: nestle.co.uk/munchies

Munchies are a type of confectionery produced by Nestlé. They were introduced by the British firm Mackintosh's in 1957. The brand was later acquired by Nestlé as part of its takeover of Rowntree Mackintosh in 1988.

The original variety of Munchies are individual milk chocolate-coated sweets with a caramel and biscuit centre.

== Variants ==
In 1995, the confectionery formerly known as "Mintola" (near-identical in appearance to Munchies, but consisting of plain chocolate with a mint fondant centre) was renamed "Mint Munchies". In 2006, Mint Munchies were again renamed, this time as "After Eight Bitesize".

In September 2019, Nestlé launched a new flavour of the Munchies confection: Chocolate Fudge Brownie. They also launched a Cookie Dough variant. They have also released a Salted Caramel Fudge flavoured variety in 2021.

In August 2020, Nestlé launched a limited-edition variant of Munchies featuring a white chocolate shell.

In March 2023, as a part of their "Golden Collection" of chocolates, Nestlé released "Munchies Gold" made with Caramac chocolate.
