= Mackintosh's Toffee =

Confectionery brand

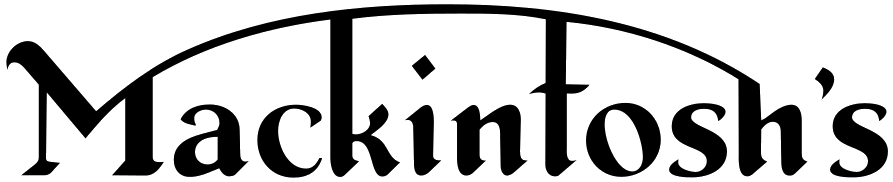
- Product type: Toffee
- Current owner: Nestlé (1988–present)
- Country: U.K.
- Introduced: 1890; 136 years ago
- Previous owners: Mackintosh's (1969); Rowntree Mackintosh (1969–1988)
- Website: nestle.ca/mackintoshtoffee

Mackintosh's Toffee is a sweet created by Mackintosh Company.

John Mackintosh opened up his sweets shop in Halifax, Yorkshire, England in 1890, and the idea for Mackintosh's Toffee ("not too hard and not too soft"), came soon after. In 1969, Mackintosh's merged with rival Rowntree to form Rowntree Mackintosh, which merged with Nestlé in 1988.

The product is often credited with being over 100 years old.

The toffee is sold in bags containing a random assortment of individual wrapped flavoured toffees. The flavours are (followed by wrapping colour): Malt (Blue), Harrogate (Yellow), Mint (Green), Egg & Cream (Orange), Coconut (Pink), and Toffee (Maroon). The maroon-wrapped toffees do not display a flavour on the wrapper. The product's subtitle is "Toffee De Luxe" and its motto is "a tradition worth sharing".

The flavour Harrogate was originally developed by confectioners in the spa town of Harrogate in Yorkshire to remove the pungent taste of the town's spa waters.

== Availability ==
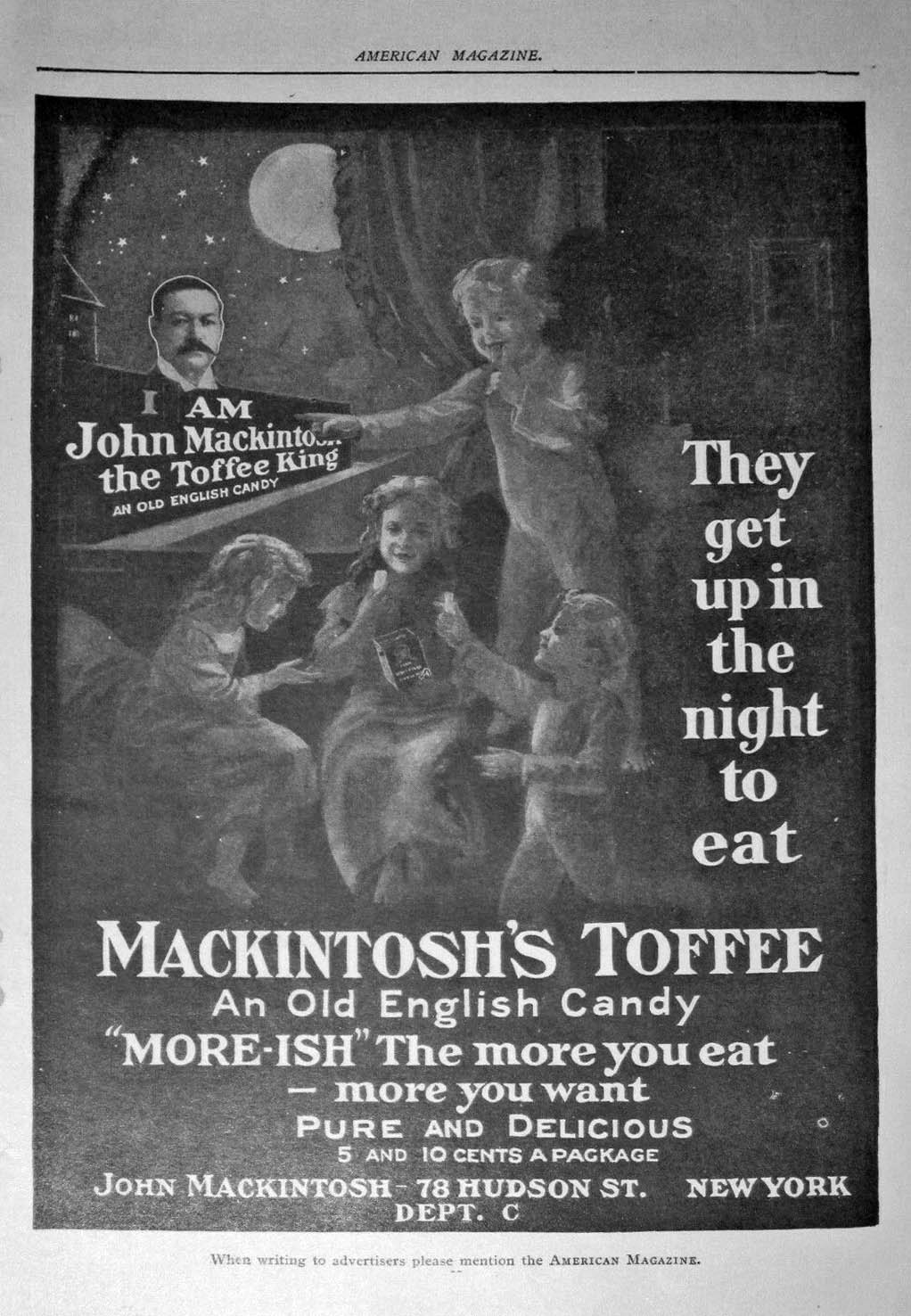
A 1900 Toffee ad by Mackintosh's

Canada had its own version of Mackintosh's Toffee. Unlike the British versions, it was a hard candy which, for most of its history, was sold as a single rectangular bar in a tartan box. More recently (circa 2008) the Canadian product is individually wrapped and manufactured in Switzerland by Nestlé, and licensed for sale in Canada by Nestlé Canada. However, the wrapped version is soft and more akin to a caramel. Recently (2013) Nestlé Canada has been distributing an apparent recreation of the hard Mack bar, though thinner and wrapped in foil. It contains sweetened condensed milk as a main flavouring and has less of the creamy butter flavour of the original Canadian Mack. Nestlé does not distribute the toffees in the US, but it may be ordered online for delivery or found in specialty candy shops.

They were also manufactured and sold in New Zealand by Nestlé New Zealand Limited under the "Allen's" Confectionery range, but are now manufactured by RJ's of Levin after Nestlé sold off its NZ confectionery brands in 2018. The New Zealand-manufactured RJ's product is also distributed in Australia.
