= Cadbury Roses =

Brand of chocolates

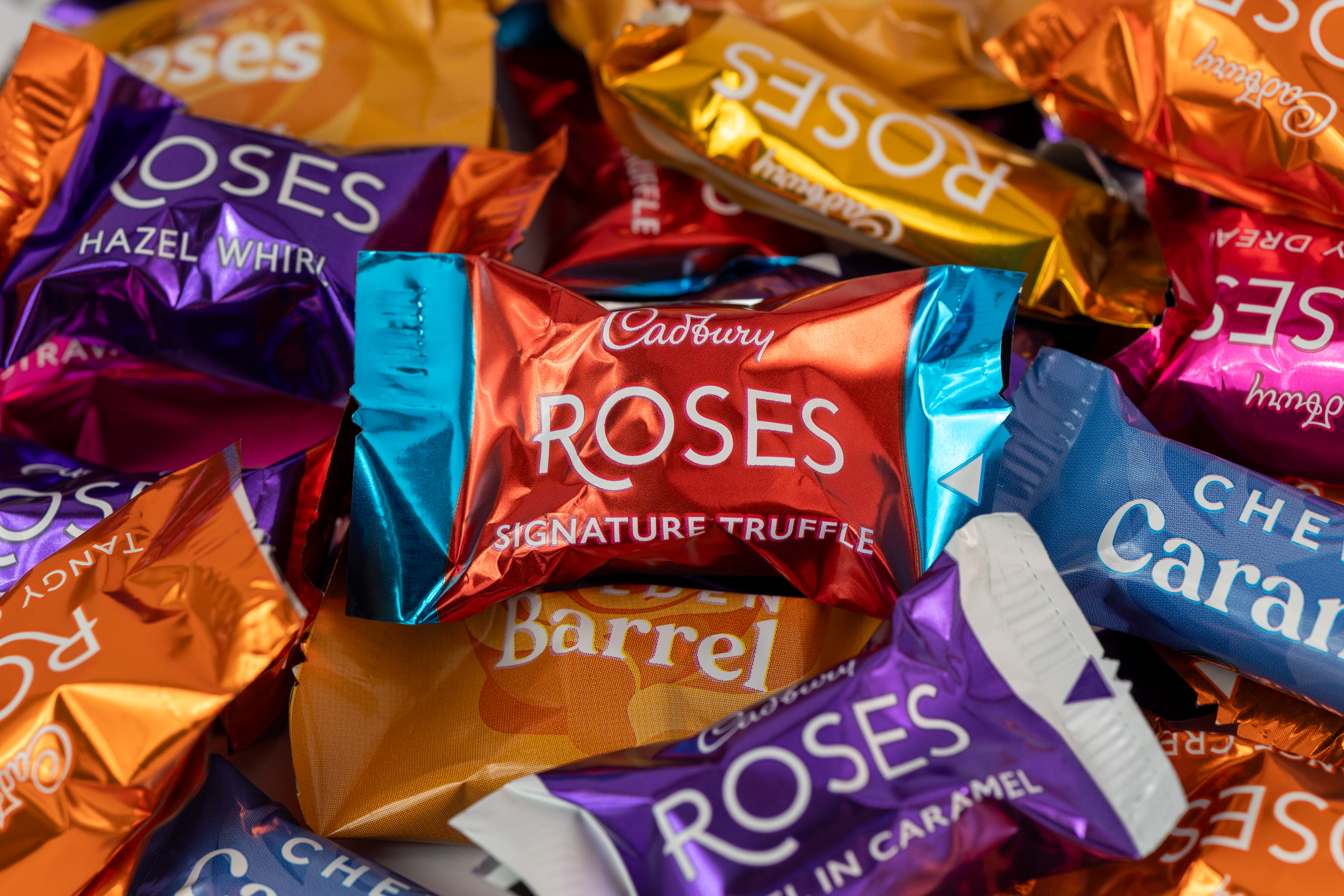
A selection of wrapped Roses

Cadbury Roses is a brand of chocolates made by British confectionery company Cadbury. Introduced in 1938 (as a competitor to Quality Street launched by Mackintosh's in 1936), Roses is a selection of individually wrapped miniature chocolates in numerous flavours.

They are an extremely common gift on Mothering Sunday in Britain and sell well throughout the Christmas period. They are available in plastic tubs, boxes and special edition tins at Christmas, and in the UK, Isle of Man and Ireland currently contain 9 different varieties of chocolate. In a YouGov poll Cadbury Roses were ranked the 6th most famous confectionery in the UK.

== Name ==
They were allegedly named after the English packaging equipment company "Rose Brothers" based in Gainsborough, Lincolnshire, that manufactured and supplied the machines that wrapped the chocolates.

In 2020, an alternative origin of the name was given in a text panel printed on the side of tubs of Roses. It notes they were named after the favourite flowers of Dorothy Cadbury, a director of the company and renowned botanist, which grew in the gardens of the original factory at Bournville.

Upon launch in Ireland they were called 'Cadbury's Irish Rose'; however, this name was discontinued in the 1970s.

== Marketing ==
Cadbury Roses have been advertised with the classic slogan of "Say 'Thank You', with Cadbury Roses" A memorable 1960s advertising campaign in Britain used the slogan 'Roses Grow On You' and included television advertisements presented by the comedian Norman Vaughan.

In 1982, Cadbury introduced a advertising campaign for Roses using an adaptation of The Scaffold's 1967 song "Thank U Very Much". The song accompanied the brand's long-running "Thank You Very Much" advertising theme, which remained in use until 1998.

== Varieties ==
Roses come in a wide variety of chocolates with different flavours and ingredients, such as caramel, nougat, hazelnut, and different types of fruit. Flavours differ between the Roses sold in the British Isles and those in the Antipodic markets, and often new flavours are created or added while others get discontinued.

== See also ==
- Cadbury Heroes
- Celebrations
- Nestlé Quality Street
