= Bugles (snack) =

Corn snack food made by General Mills

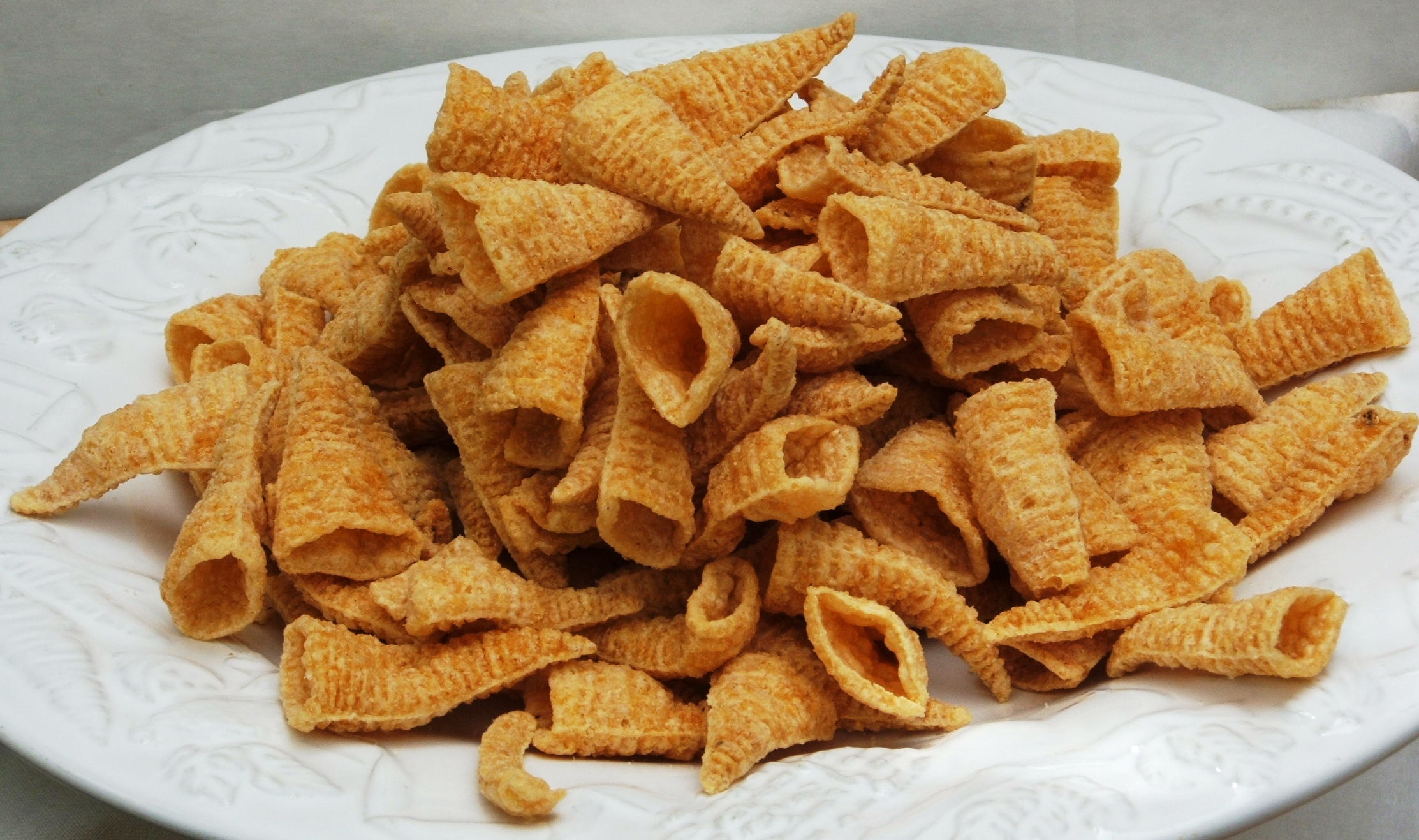

Nutritional value per 25 g (0.88 oz) pouch
- Energy: 1,500 kJ (360 kcal)
- Carbohydrates: 15g
- Sugars: 4g
- Fat: 7g
- Saturated: 4g
- Trans: 0g
- Protein: 4g
Vitamins and minerals
Minerals	Quantity %DV^{†}
Sodium	12% 270 mg
- Other constituents: Quantity
- 15g

Package of Bugles

Bugles are a corn snack produced by General Mills and Tom's Snacks (under license from General Mills).

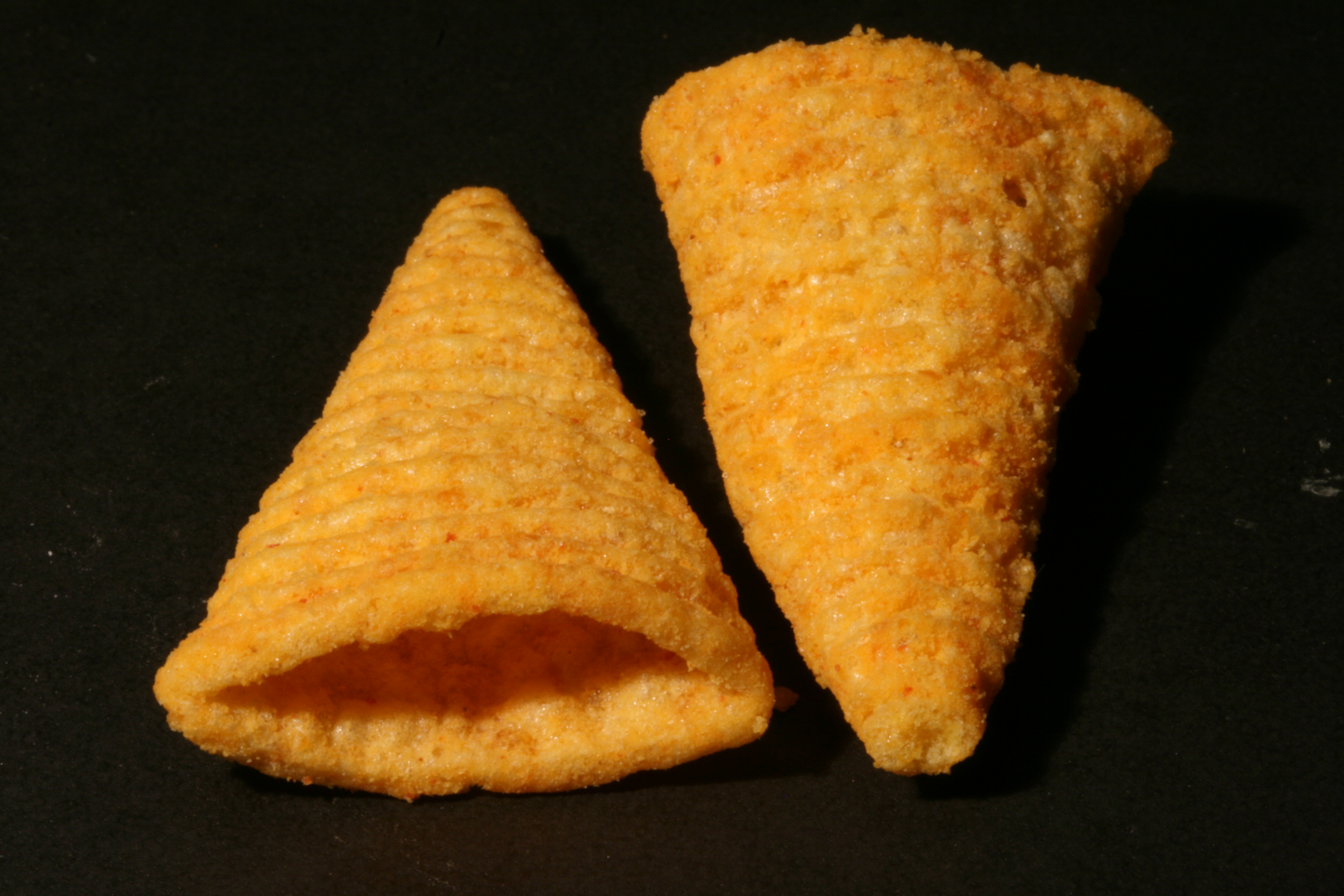
Bugles in detail

== History ==
Bugles were developed by a food engineer, Verne E. Weiss of Plymouth, Minnesota. Horn-shaped Bugles were test-marketed in 1965 and introduced nationally in early 1966 as one of several new General Mills snacks, including flower-shaped Daisys [sic]; wheel-shaped Pizza Spins; tube-shaped Whistles; cheddar cheese-flavored Buttons; and bow-shaped, popcorn-flavored Bows, all of which were discontinued in the 1970s.

From the time of their creation in the 1960s, General Mills' Bugles were manufactured at a plant in West Chicago, Illinois, until that plant's closure in 2017. Bugles and the other snacks were also produced in Lancaster, Ohio, starting in 1981. It is now a Ralston Foods Plant part of Con-Agra.

== Ingredients and varieties ==
General Mills Bugles are fried in coconut oil, which contributes to their being significantly higher in medium-chain triglyceride saturated fat than similar snack foods, which are typically fried in soybean or other vegetable oils. Bugles contain no hydrogenated oils.

The ingredients of Original Bugles are degermed yellow corn meal, coconut oil, sugar, salt, baking soda, and BHT. Ingredients for all variations of Bugles are listed on the General Mills website.

Bugles produced under the Tom's Snacks label no longer use coconut oil, but rather "vegetable oil (contains one or more of the following: canola oil, corn oil, or sunflower oil)."

They have been available in the following flavors: Original, Nacho Cheese, Salt & Vinegar, Sour Cream & Onion, Ranch, Chili Cheese, Salsa, Smokin' BBQ, Churros, Southwest Ranch, Sweet and Salty Chocolate Peanut Butter, Sweet and Salty Caramel, Cheddar, Ketchup, Coriander, Cookies and Cream, Hot Buffalo, Shrimp, Jalapeño Cheddar, Hot & Spicy, and Hot & Spicy BBQ (exclusively manufactured by Tom's). In addition to original flavors, the brand has also had crossover flavors like with Hidden Valley Ranch and Cinnamon Toast Crunch.

== International sales ==
As of November 2014, Bugles were sold as Bugles in the United States, Canada, China, Denmark, Iraq, The Netherlands, and several more countries in Central America and the Caribbean.

Bugles were discontinued in Canada in early 2010 due to a decrease in customer demand, but were soon brought back in November 2011 due to a renew in demand. On November 14, 2022, the official Bugles Twitter account confirmed that their products were again no longer available in Canada. In the United Kingdom, Bugles were available in the early 2000s and manufactured by Golden Wonder. They were discontinued after several years, but were brought back in 2016, and are now manufactured by Walkers.

General Mills also licenses the name and shape to other manufacturers of the same product:

- In Cyprus, Bugles are manufactured by People's Coffee Manuf. Ltd and are being marketed and distributed by Laiko Cosmos Trading Ltd. They are available in 3 flavors, Original, Nachos and Vinegar.
- In Kuwait, Bugles are manufactured and marketed by the KITCO parent company.
- In the United Arab Emirates, Bugles manufactured by IFFCO UAE under their Tiffany subdivision, and is marketed and sold as Bugles with similar styling to the U.S. Bugles.
- In Saudi Arabia, Bugles are produced and marketed by Star Food Industries. Its package has the Saudi Made certification marks.
- In France, Bugles are manufactured and marketed by the Benenuts marque of Groupe Pepsico of France under the name 3-D's Bugles in various flavors, including natural, cheese, bacon, ketchup, and ham & cheese.
- In Italy, they are called "Virtual" and have been produced by San Carlo.
- In China, Bugles are manufactured and marketed by Pepsi.
- In Taiwan, Bugles are named "Golden Horns" and have been manufactured by Serena Foods.
- In Japan, Bugles are named "Tongari Corn" (とんがりコーン) and have been manufactured by House Foods since 1978.
- In South Korea, they are known as "Kkokkal Korn" (꼬깔콘) and have been produced by Lotte Confectionery since 1983.
- In Sweden and Norway a similar product is known as "Sombreros", made by Estrella/Maarud. However, Sombreros are fried in canola oil/sunflower oil.
- In Israel they are known as "Apropo", and are made by Osem.
- In Turkey, they are called "Cherezza Twist" and "Patos Critos" as they are manufactured by two different companies.
- In Brazil, they are manufactured by Yoki, a brand of General Mills.
- In Singapore, Bugles are manufactured by Tong Garden Food Products under license. Tong Garden fries its Bugles in palm oil.
- In Poland, Bugles are sold by Frito Lay Poland Ltd. under "star" brand name.
- In the United Kingdom, Bugles are sold by Walkers.
- In the Netherlands, Germany, Austria, Belgium, Denmark, Iceland, Oman, and Sweden, Bugles are sold by Lay's as Lay's Bugles.
- In Spain and Portugal, Bugles are manufactured by Matutano under the name of 3-D's Bugles and only Bacon-Cheese flavour.
- In South Africa, Bugles are Manufactured by Simba as Doritos 3D
- In Argentina, Bugles are manufactured by PepsiCo as 3D's
- In Lebanon, they are manufactured by Fantasia Chips.
- In Indonesia, Bugles product are held by Garuda Food as Garuda O'Corn snack since 2020.
- In Jordan, Bugles are manufactured by Haddad Group's Mr. Chips brand.
