= Gale's =

Food brand marketed by Premier Foods

- Company type: Private (1919–86)
- Industry: Food
- Founded: 1919; 107 years ago
- Founder: Richard Westley Gale
- Fate: Acquired by Rowntree Mackintosh in 1986, currently a brand
- Headquarters: United Kingdom
- Area served: U.K.
- Products: Honey
- Parent: Premier Foods (2002–present); Nestlé (1988–2002); Rowntree Mackintosh (1986–88)
- Website: galeshoney.co.uk

Gale's is a United Kingdom brand of honey, currently owned by Premier Foods. The former company had been established in 1919, remaining independent until it was acquired by Rowntree Mackintosh Confectionery in 1986.

== History ==
The company was established in 1919, when Richard Westley Gale (born 1895 in Hendon) of Richmond and Sidney Thomas Rayner of Mortlake started their business as "Rayner & Gale" which was a partnership. The partnership was dissolved on 3 July 1926 and it became "R.W. Gale & Co. Ltd", based in the SW9 district of south London.

=== Reckitt & Colman ===
In 1948 Joseph Farrow & Company of the Carlton Works, Fletton near Peterborough, a subsidiary of Reckitt & Colman that made canned foods (green peas, later marrowfat peas), bought the company. In the early 1960s it introduced a peanut spread called Smooth'n Nutty. In 1962 it introduced mincemeat. It was made in Carrow, Norwich.

For many years Gale's were the UK's biggest manufacturer of honey.

=== Rowntree Mackintosh ===
On 28 November 1986 it was bought by Rowntree Mackintosh Confectionery for £11 million, and production moved to Hadfield, Derbyshire. The Norwich site was later owned by Unilever Bestfoods from 1995. The Hadfield Industrial Estate site, next to the River Etherow, had been bought by Rowntree's in June 1967.

Rowntree Mackintosh was bought by Nestlé on 28 June 1988 in a hostile takeover.

=== Premier Foods ===
In May 2002 it was acquired by Premier Foods, when it also bought Rowntree's's Jelly and other Nestlé brands for £132 million. The Hadfield site was closed in the first quarter of 2004, and production moved to the desserts and spreads plant in Cambridgeshire which also made Hartley's jam.

It is now made at Premier Foods plant at Histon, north of Cambridge. It sells around 4 million jars a year. The plant is next to the Cambridgeshire Guided Busway (former Cambridge & St. Ives Branch).

== Marketing ==
In 1964, when owned by Joseph Farrow, it promoted the idea of stirring some of its honey into hot milk for a nightcap, or to help a sore throat by putting honey into hot water with some lemon juice. In the 1960s the account was handled by JWT.

A jingle used to advertise the honey was: Gale's, Gale's pass the honey please, think about the honey, think about the bees.

It sells strongly in the winter months from November to February each year.

== Varieties ==
- Gale's Traditional Set Honey
- Gale's Traditional Clear Honey
- Gale's Lemon Curd
