= Matchmakers =

Nestlé chocolate confectionary

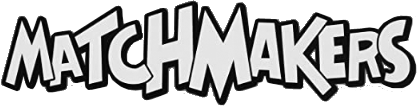
- Product type: Chocolate sticks
- Current owner: Nestlé
- Country: UK
- Introduced: 1968
- Previous owners: Rowntree's
- Website: nestle.co.uk/matchmakers

Matchmakers is a brand of chocolate sticks currently owned and made by Nestlé. Thin, twig-like and brittle, they were first launched in 1968 by Rowntree's and were one-third of the length they are now - about the length of a match. For many years they were available in either orange, mint, lemon (from the brand's 25th anniversary) or coffee flavour (from its 10th anniversary).

In 2003 Nestlé attempted to raise brand awareness by changing the names of the flavours to Cool Mint and Zingy Orange and adding Brilliant Blackcurrant and Sizzling Strawberry flavour – which counted 'black pepper flavoured sugar pieces' among its ingredients. Similarly, the packaging was altered in an attempt to appeal to 15- to 35-year-olds, and a new slogan was adopted – 'The manic munch that packs a punch'.

Brandysnap, Cappuccino, Coconut, Christmas Orange Spice, Nutty, Coffee, Lemon and Irish Cream varieties have been produced – sometimes as anniversary special editions – and are not currently available. Brilliant Blackcurrant and Sizzling Strawberry have also been withdrawn.

In 2008, Nestlé rebranded Matchmakers as 'Quality Street Matchmakers', Quality Street also being a Nestlé brand. They are still available in 'Zingy Orange', 'Cool Mint' and 'Yummy Honeycomb' flavours.

In 2017, before Matchmakers reached its 50th anniversary, they became available in a new limited edition 'Salted Caramel' flavour, and from the 50th anniversary in October 2018 another limited edition flavour of 'Gingerbread'. September 2019 saw another limited edition flavour's appearance in a sky blue box called 'Maple & Pecan'.

In 2022 the 'Salted Caramel', 'Gingerbread' and 'Maple & Pecan' flavours have all been withdrawn and 'Yummy Honeycomb' and 'Coffee' flavours have returned with the name changing due to merging 'Coffee' and 'Salted Caramel' flavours to Caramel Coffee and cutting the name to Honeycomb.
