= Celebrations (confectionery) =

Miniature chocolate bar selection

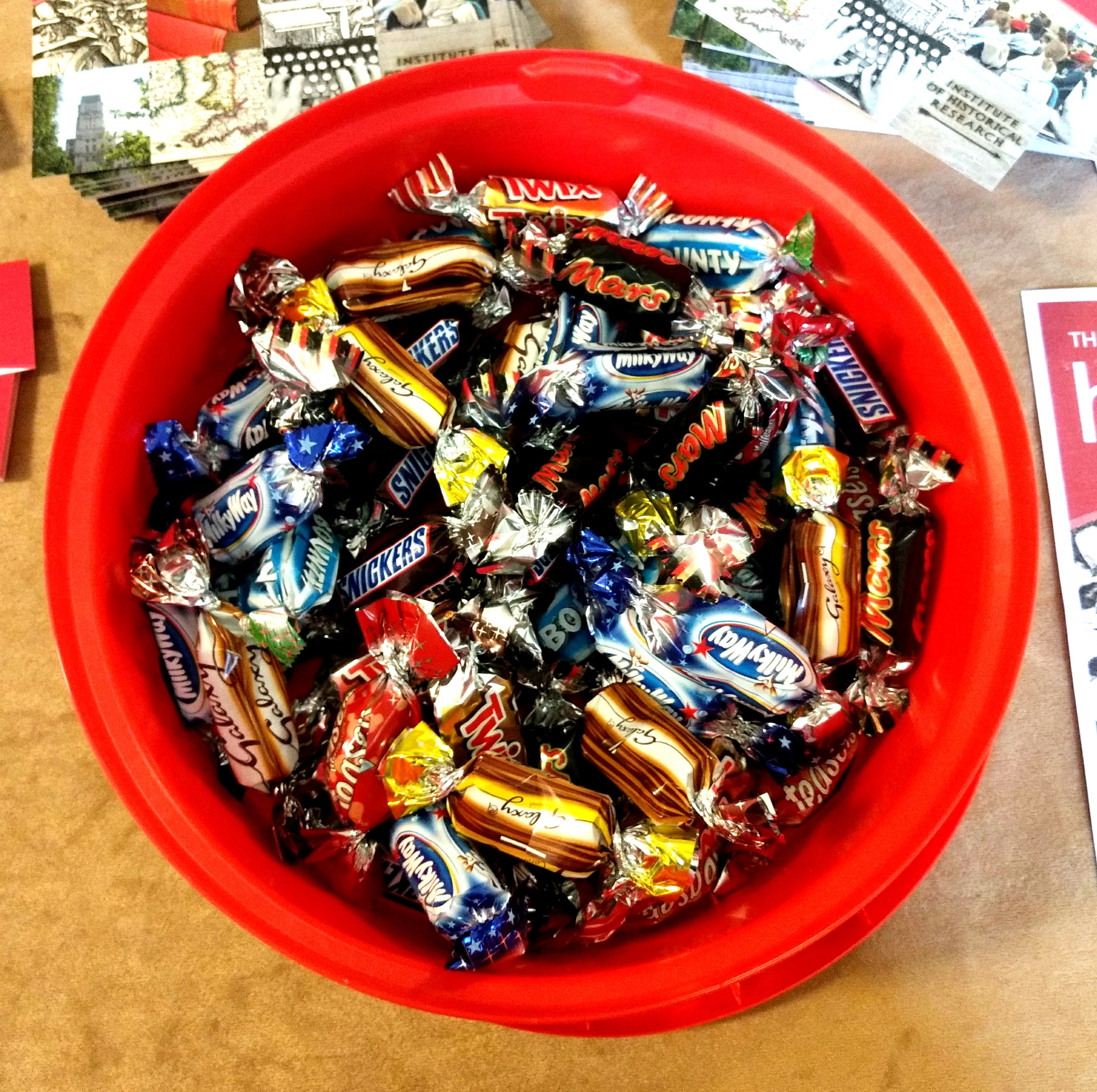
- Product type: Chocolate bar
- Current owner: Mars, Incorporated
- Produced by: Mars, Incorporated
- Country: United Kingdom
- Introduced: 1997; 29 years ago
- Website: celebrations.de

Celebrations is a British boxed chocolate product manufactured by Mars, Incorporated since 1997. It comprises miniature versions of full size chocolate bars from across the Mars brands.

== Contents ==
Aside from small variations between countries, Celebrations usually consist of:

- Maltesers Teaser
- Mars
- Milky Way
- Snickers
- Galaxy/Dove
- Galaxy/Dove Caramel
- Twix
- Bounty

In the past the selection also sold in some places with Galaxy Truffle (until 2011) and Topic (until 2006). Bounty was removed from some Celebrations tubs sold in Britain in 2022 after the manufacturers found that 40% of people hated them. A limited run of "No Bounty" tubs were sold in the weeks before Christmas, but a final decision had not been made after 18% of people named the Bounty as their favourite.

== Rival products ==
- Cadbury Roses
- Cadbury Heroes/Favourites
- Nestlé Quality Street
