= Tom's Snacks =

American snack food brand

Tom's Foods
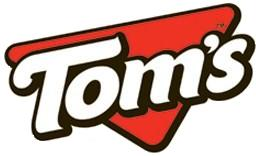
- Formerly: Tom Huston Peanut Company; Tom's Foods (1966–2005)
- Company type: Private (1925–66); Subsidiary (1966–2005)
- Industry: Food
- Founded: 1925
- Founder: Tom Huston
- Defunct: 2005; 21 years ago
- Fate: Acquired by General Mills in 1966, declared bankruptcy in 2005
- Headquarters: Charlotte, NC, U.S.
- Key people: David Singer CEO
- Products: Snack food
- Parent: General Mills (1966–83); Rowntree Mackintosh (1983–89); Nestlé S.A. (1989–93); Heico Acquisitions (1993–2005)
- Website: sanantoniosnacks.com

Tom's Snacks Co. is an American snack food brand currently owned by San Antonio Snacks. The former "Tom's Foods Company" had been established by Tom Huston in Columbus, Georgia, in 1925. The business remained in the food industry until 2005 when it declared bankruptcy, with the brand being acquired by Snyder's-Lance, Inc.

== History ==
=== Beginning ===
In 1925, Tom Huston founded "Tom's Roasted Peanuts", and began selling his peanuts for a nickel a bag. Within two years, Tom's peanuts were being sold around the country, generating US$4 million in sales. Due to unpaid notes, though, Huston lost the company to the bank. In 1932, Walter Richards bought Tom's from the bank and took the company public. By the 1950s, sales reached $16 million.

=== Changes in ownership ===
In 1966, General Mills acquired Tom's for $75 million, and changed the name to "Tom's Foods". In the 1970s, General Mills attempted to launch Tom's chips into national supermarkets and branched off a new vending office snack service. By 1983, Tom's had changed ownership again. Rowntree Mackintosh paid $215 million to acquire the company in a mutual agreement. During their ownership, they launched a franchise program for their distributors. Due to the lack of sales, the company was once again sold. TF Acquisition Corporation took over the company in 1988, paying $200 million in a management buyout. Under this new ownership, they opened new chip plants in Columbus, Georgia and Tennessee expanding their network of independent distributors.

Tom's had goals of increasing sales to over $400 million over the next five years. Their goals fell short, and in 1993, Heico Acquisitions took the company over. Over the next few years, sales suffered, falling to $200 million. As a result, Tom's Foods had declared bankruptcy.

=== Today ===
In 2005, Lance Inc. won the bid to acquire Tom's Foods for $37.9 million plus certain liabilities and renamed it Tom's Snacks Co. As of 2016, Tom's products are distributed across the country by Snyder's-Lance.

Tom's Snacks is the first mainstream snack company to feature wrestlers on the packaging of their potato chip bags, including TNA stars Kurt Angle, Rob Van Dam, Mr. Anderson, Velvet Sky, "The Pope" D'angelo Dinero, and A.J. Styles.

== Products ==
Tom's products include potato chips, corn chips, fries, tortilla chips, and pork skins.

Additionally, Bugles are manufactured under the brand name.
