= Caramac =

Brand of confectionery by Nestlé

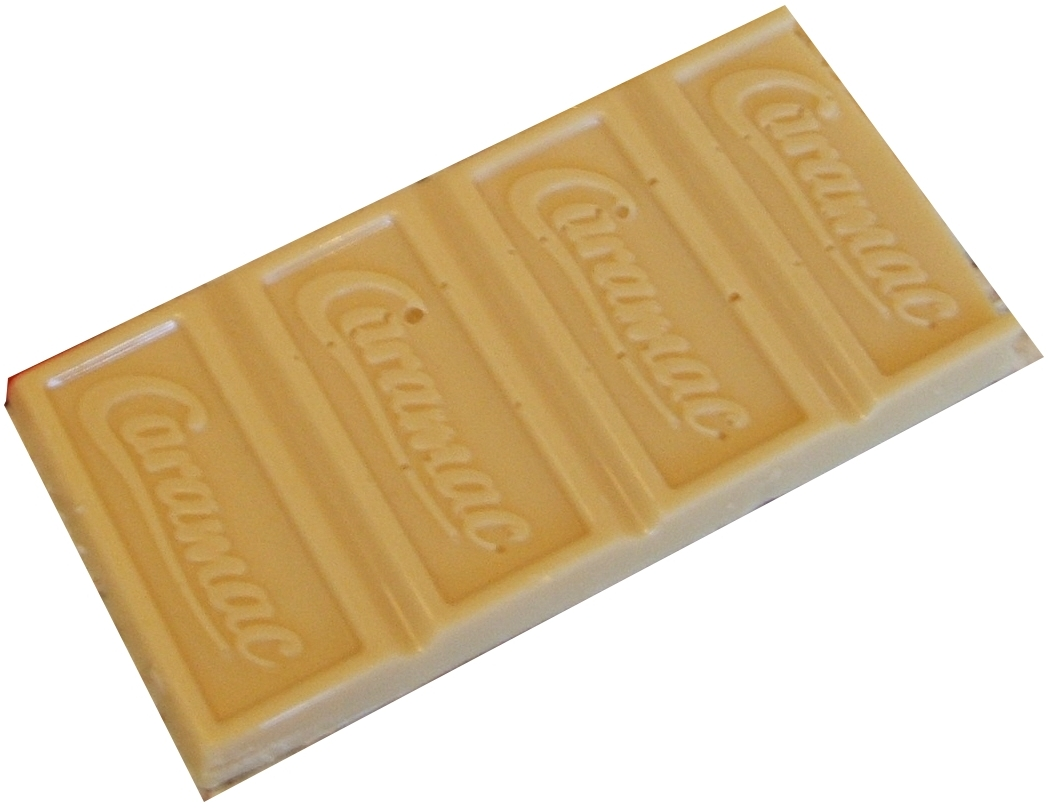
- Product type: Confection
- Current owner: Nestlé
- Country: UK
- Introduced: 1959; 67 years ago
- Previous owners: Mackintosh's
- Website: nestle.co.uk/caramac

Caramac was the brand name for a caramel-based confectionery in the United Kingdom introduced by Mackintosh's in 1959 and later manufactured by successor companies Rowntree Mackintosh from 1969 and Nestlé from 1988. Caramac was discontinued in 2023 and brought back for a limited period in July 2024. The name was derived from the syllabic abbreviation of Caramel and Mackintosh.

A similar confection is used in the covering of McVitie's Gold biscuit bar.

== History ==
The name of the product was determined in a competition. The competition was held in what was the Norwich factory of Mackintosh's, and won by Barbara Herne. The bar was made at the old Norwich factory until its closure in 1996, when production transferred to Fawdon on Tyneside.

A limited edition Caramac Kit Kat bar was released in the United Kingdom in 2005 and due to popular demand it was brought back in 2007.

In 2015, "Caramac Giant Buttons" were launched, being a packet of flat, circular Caramac sweets.

Nestle announced in November 2023 that they would be withdrawing the Caramac from their range due to low sales. The bar was brought back for a "limited release" in July 2024.

== Design ==
The bar was a light brown colour and was manufactured using sweetened condensed milk, butter, various flavourings, and sugar, similar ingredients to vanilla fudge, with a similar flavour. It also tasted like blond chocolate (a variant of white chocolate), though Caramac used palm and shea butter rather than cocoa butter.

It was packaged in a red and yellow wrapper.
