= Quality Street (1927 film) =

1927 film by Sidney Franklin

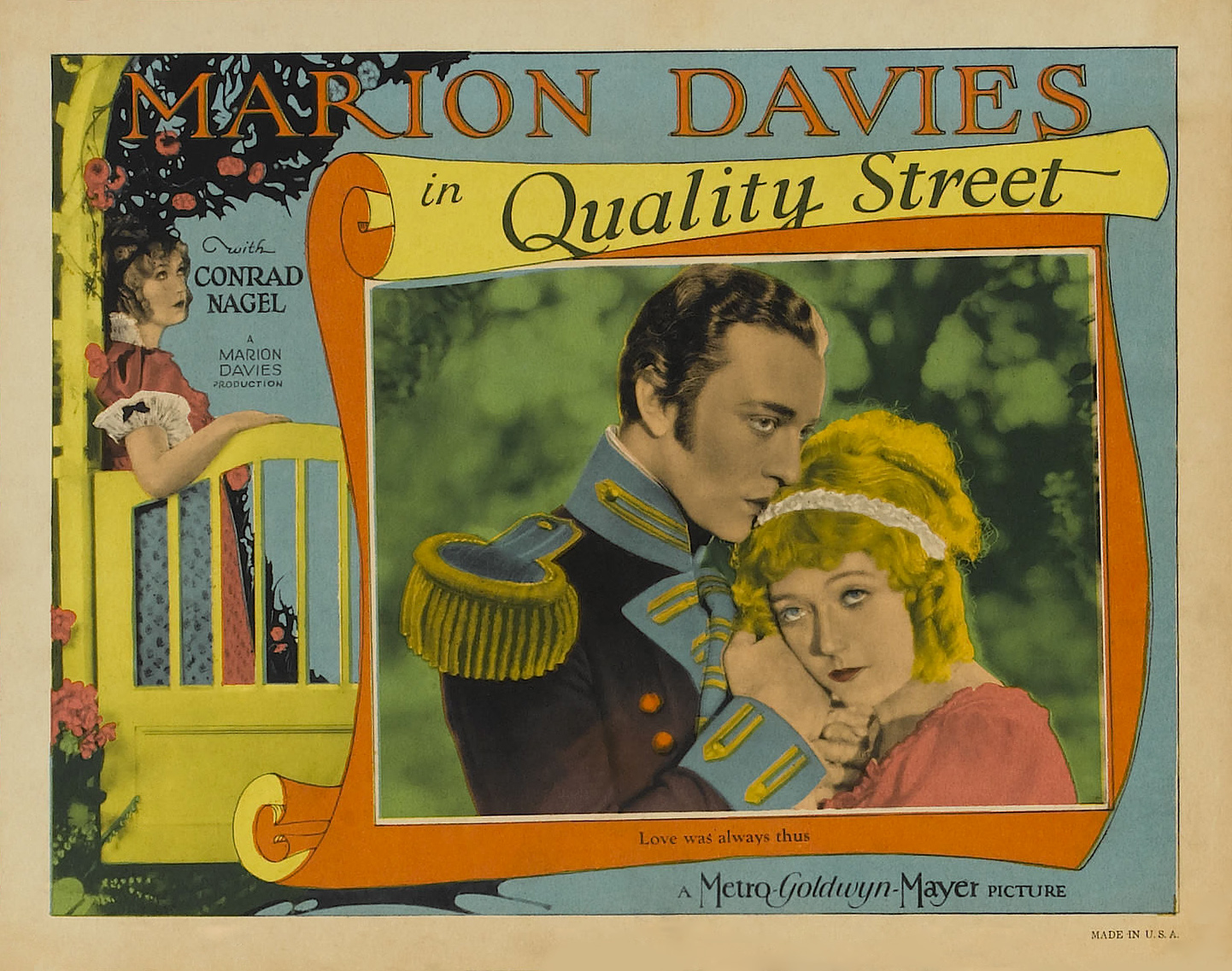
- Directed by: Sidney Franklin
- Written by: Albert Lewin; Hans Kraly
- Based on: Quality Street; 1901 play by J.M. Barrie
- Produced by: Marion Davies; Irving Thalberg; William Randolph Hearst
- Starring: Marion Davies; Conrad Nagel; Helen Jerome Eddy
- Cinematography: Hendrik Sartov
- Edited by: Ben Lewis
- Production company: Cosmopolitan Productions
- Distributed by: Metro-Goldwyn-Mayer
- Release date: November 1, 1927
- Running time: 80 minutes
- Country: United States
- Languages: Silent film; English intertitles
- Budget: $592,000

Quality Street is a 1927 American silent romance film directed by Sidney Franklin and starring Marion Davies, Conrad Nagel and Helen Jerome Eddy. Produced by Cosmopolitan Productions for release through MGM, it was based on the 1901 play of the same name by James M. Barrie. Prints of this film are preserved at the Library of Congress and in the Turner Archive.

In 2002, the film was released on DVD by the Milestone Films and Video company releasing through Image Entertainment.

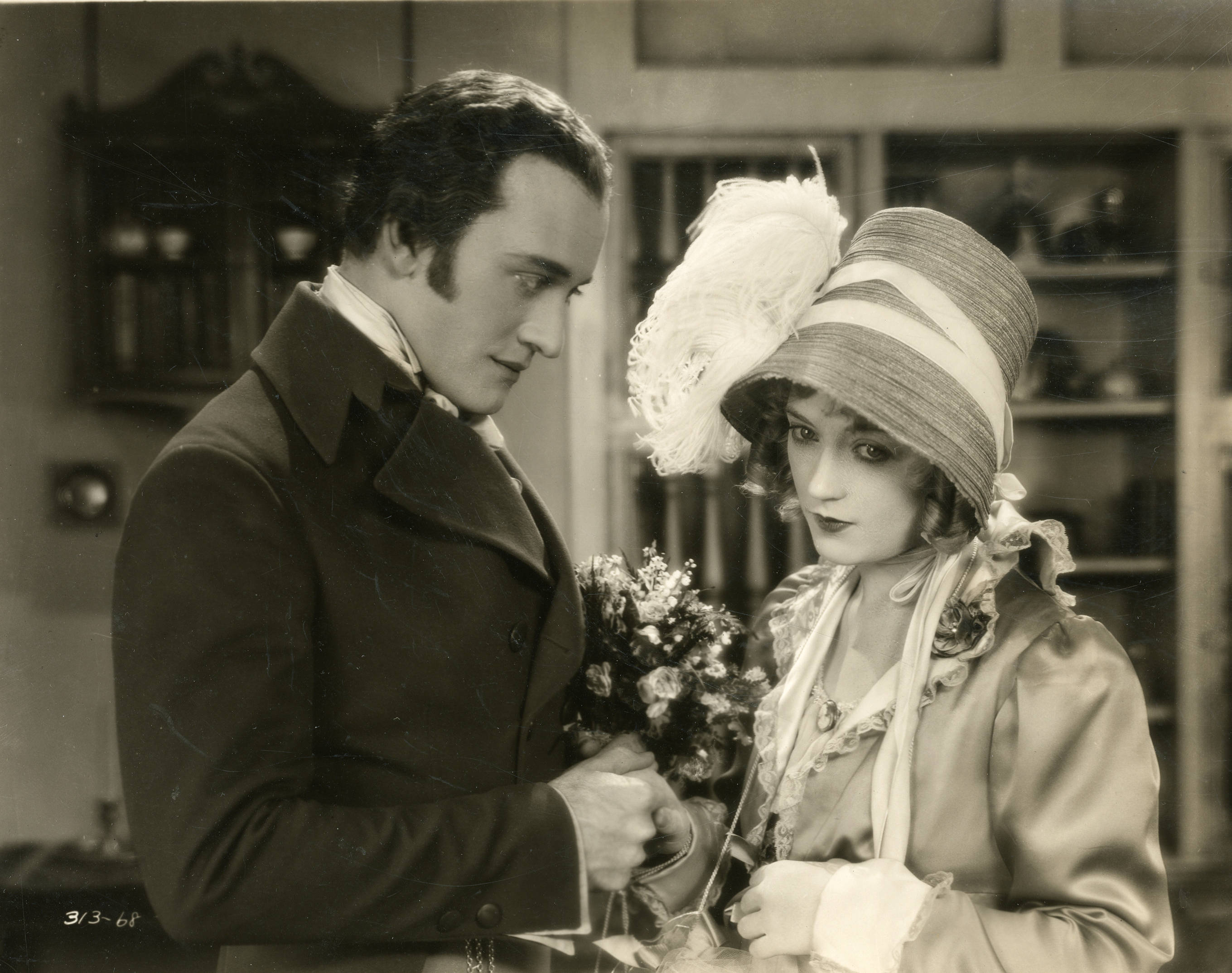
Quality Street publicity still, 1926

There was also a sound film version made in 1937, starring Katharine Hepburn.

== Plot ==
in 1805, young, beautiful Phoebe Throssel and her spinster sister Susan live together at their house in Quality Street, with their servant Patty, and their principal friends their neighbours, the Misses Willoughby and Henrietta Turnbull all in varying degrees of spinsterhood, and Valentine Brown, the local doctor, whom it is common belief is soon to propose to Phoebe: in fact, he said to her the night before he had something surprising to tell her, and Susan (who has been making a wedding-dress first for herself and then for Phoebe for the past ten years) and she assume it is a proposal. However, Brown reveals he is going off to fight in the then-raging Napoleonic wars; and Phoebe hides her disappointment so well that he thinks she is pleased--she also manages to stop Susan from mentioning that the investment Brown advised them upon lost them half their fortune, and has rendered them nigh destitute.

Ten years later, Phoebe and Susan have been running a school, Susan much the same but Phoebe having transformed into a tired old maid: a good deal of comic interaction between Phoebe and their students occurs, including Phoebe's altercations with Arthur Wellesley Tomson, who beat up a boy for saying Phoebe did not whip effectively, and is now wishful to be caned for it, the bully William Smith, who chases Susan through the room with her whip, and with Isabella, who is more intelligent than both her schoolmistresses.

Presently, Patty shows in the now-Captain Brown, who lost his hand at Waterloo and whose hair is gray, who seems quite taken aback at Phoebe's appearance, although he vainly endeavours to hide his shock. He says he obtained tickets for them to attend the first of three balls to celebrate the end of the Wars, but Phoebe, hurt, declines to come, and Susan of course backs her up. Presently there also arrive Phoebe and Susan's first-year student Ensign Blades and his girl Charlotte Parratt, who pass the time of day. After all have left, a bitter Phoebe dresses herself up in her old clothes to try cheer herself up, and Captain Brown, to whom she mentioned a headache, returns just afterward with a cordial he has obtained for it. Phoebe introduces herself as her own niece, Livvy (Susan and Phoebe have a brother called James), Patty backs her up, and Phoebe forces Susan to do likewise; and Captain Brown seems infatuated, inviting her out to the ball with him, and Susan as her chaperone, since Phoebe is laid down by her "headache". By the third ball, Livvy is the only girl attracting attentions--even Blades has forgone the disconsolate Charlotte for her, temporarily--but she shall only dance and consort with Captain Brown, who seems more infatuated than ever. Later, Phoebe pretends to fall ill, and manages to get Blades and Brown out of the room, informing Susan that Nancy Willoughby and Miss Turnbull have followed her to the ball, and seem to suspect something; she also lets slip that her plan is to vindictively lead Brown on, and when he proposes, as Miss Livvy to laugh at him and berate him as old and broken-down, which Susan does not like. However, when Miss Nancy and Miss Turnbull arrive and Phoebe manages by lucky subterfuge to misdirect them; also taking advantage of the fact that Charlotte in her cloak is outside, and saying to them that SHE is Phoebe, and that Charlotte, whose face is obscured, and `.

Somewhat later, Captain Brown manages to get Livvy alone, and berates her, to her great surprise, for her thoughtlessness, flirting, and frivolity, and tells her he is in love with, and intends presently to propose to, her "Aunt" Phoebe; at which Phoebe is simultaneously distressed and ecstatic. A few days afterward, Phoebe and Susan are stuck at home, Phoebe rendered half-prostrate from guilt and Susan becoming ever more desperate, since they have had to pretend "Livvy" ill and keep her away in her room, but cannot remove her from the house since the Misses Willoughby and Miss Turnbull are constantly watching the house from all angles, thinking that Phoebe is keeping Livvy in her room out of jealousy and forcing her not to leave it. At length, Brown arrives, manages to distract the Misses Willoughby and Turnbull and persuade them to depart, forces Patty to admit to the deception, and pretends to escort "Livvy", in fact a bundle of women's clothes carefully arranged upon his arm, to a carriage, and sent Patty off with her. After he returns, he confronts Phoebe with everything, and, everything admitted upon both sides, he proposes, and Phoebe primly accepts.

== Cast ==
- Marion Davies as Phoebe Throssel
- Conrad Nagel as Dr. Valentine Brown
- Helen Jerome Eddy as Susan Throssel
- Flora Finch as Mary Willoughby
- Margaret Seddon as Nancy Willoughby
- Marcelle Corday as Henrietta Turnbull
- Kate Price as Patty

== Production ==
In her 26th film, Marion Davies starred in this romantic drama as a young woman about to be married when the man (Conrad Nagel) suddenly goes off to war. Set during the Napoleonic Wars, Davies made her last silent "costume picture." She plays both Phoebe and (years later) the invented niece Livvy. This was only the second film in which Davies played an "old and faded" woman. The other was in The Young Diana. Davies won rave reviews, but the film was not a success. It earned the lowest gross receipts of all her MGM silent films.

== See also ==
- Quality Street (1937 film)
- Quality Street (play)
