= IFFCO Group =

UAE-based fast-moving consumer goods company

- Type: Private
- Industry: Fast-moving consumer goods
- Founded: 1975
- Founder: Abdul Razak Allana
- Headquarters: United Arab Emirates
- Area served: 100+ countries
- Products: Edible oils and fats; impulse foods; culinary ingredients; ice cream; agri-products; personal & home care; packaging
- Brands: London Dairy; Tiffany; Noor; Rahma; Al Baker; Igloo; Hayat; Savannah
- Number of employees: 12,000+ (group-wide)
- Website: iffco.com

IFFCO Group is a privately held fast-moving consumer goods (FMCG) company based in the United Arab Emirates (UAE). Founded in 1975 by Indian entrepreneur Abdul Razak Allana, the group manufactures and markets food and non-food products across the Middle East and other regions.

== History ==
IFFCO began operations in the UAE in 1975 and expanded into branded consumer goods during the 1980s and 1990s under the Allana family’s leadership. In July 2006, Gulf News reported a US$275 million food production complex for IFFCO in Dubai Industrial City to produce brands such as Noor, London Dairy, Al Baker and Tiffany.

In June 2010, a 500,000 m^{2} logistics area opened in Dubai Industrial City to support regional exports.

In November 2022, IFFCO and DP World agreed to develop a 30,000 m^{2} edible oil packing plant in the BEZ Berbera Economic Zone Somaliland.

In March 2023, THRYVE, described as the Middle East’s first 100% plant-based meat factory, opened in Dubai Industrial City.

In June 2024, Italy’s export credit agency SACE announced an Islamic facility with IFFCO to support the Italian food and beverage value chain under SACE’s Push Strategy.

== Operations ==
IFFCO has presence across multiple business lines, including agri-commodities, oils and fats, impulse foods, culinary, personal and home care, packaging solutions, sales and distribution, logistics, and foodservice. For the out-of-home segment, the company highlights a foodservice unit branded as IFFCO Professional.

== Sustainability ==
IFFCO publishes environmental, social and governance (ESG) reports and has set a Sustainability Strategy 2030. In December 2023, trade outlets reported the launch of a carbon-neutral olive oil under the Rahma brand.

In 2024, Tetra Pak’s first Arabia Sustainability Report highlighted a water-recovery station at IFFCO’s Nabatat plant in Saudi Arabia that reportedly reuses up to 95% of water used in filling equipment. Also in 2024, Noor Oil’s programme with the BEEAH Group to recycle used cooking oil into biodiesel was reported by ESG MENA.

== Notes ==
- Sometimes stylised as IFFCO or IFFCO Group of Companies; it is unrelated to India’s Indian Farmers Fertiliser Cooperative (IFFCO).
