= Quality Street (confectionery) =

British brand of confectionery

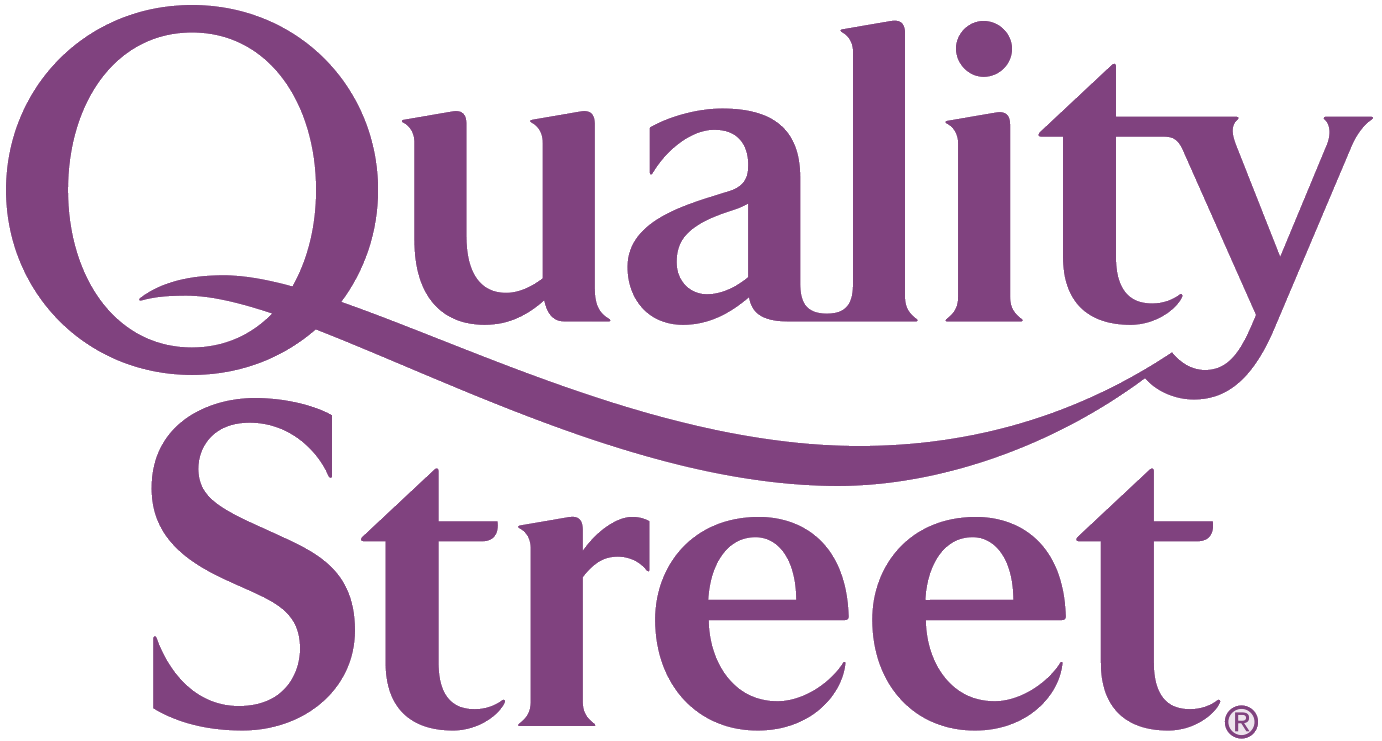

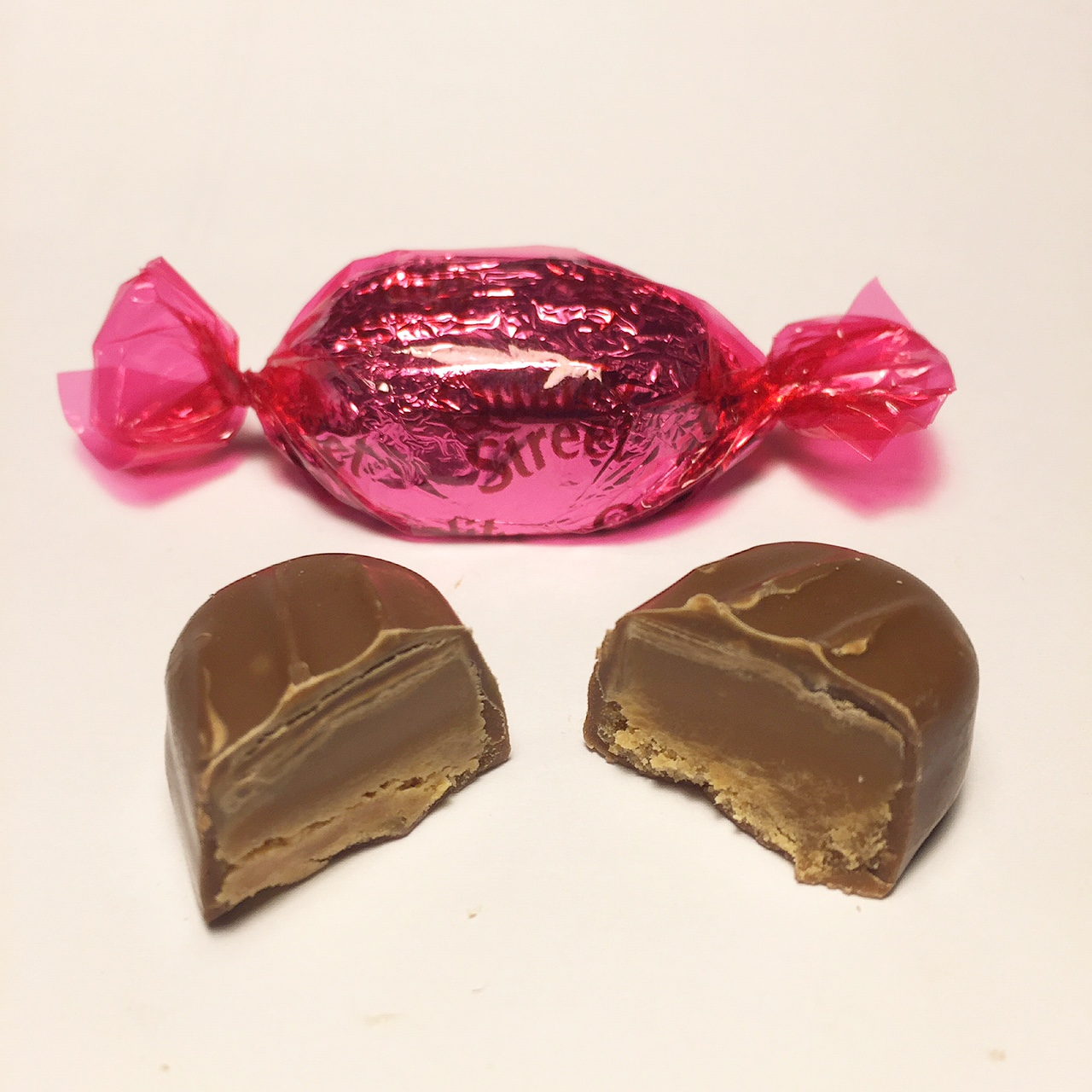
- Quality Street Vanilla Fudge
- Product type: Candy
- Current owner: Nestlé
- Country: United Kingdom
- Introduced: 1936; 90 years ago
- Markets: Worldwide (excluding US)
- Previous owners: Mackintosh's
- Website: qualitystreet.co.uk

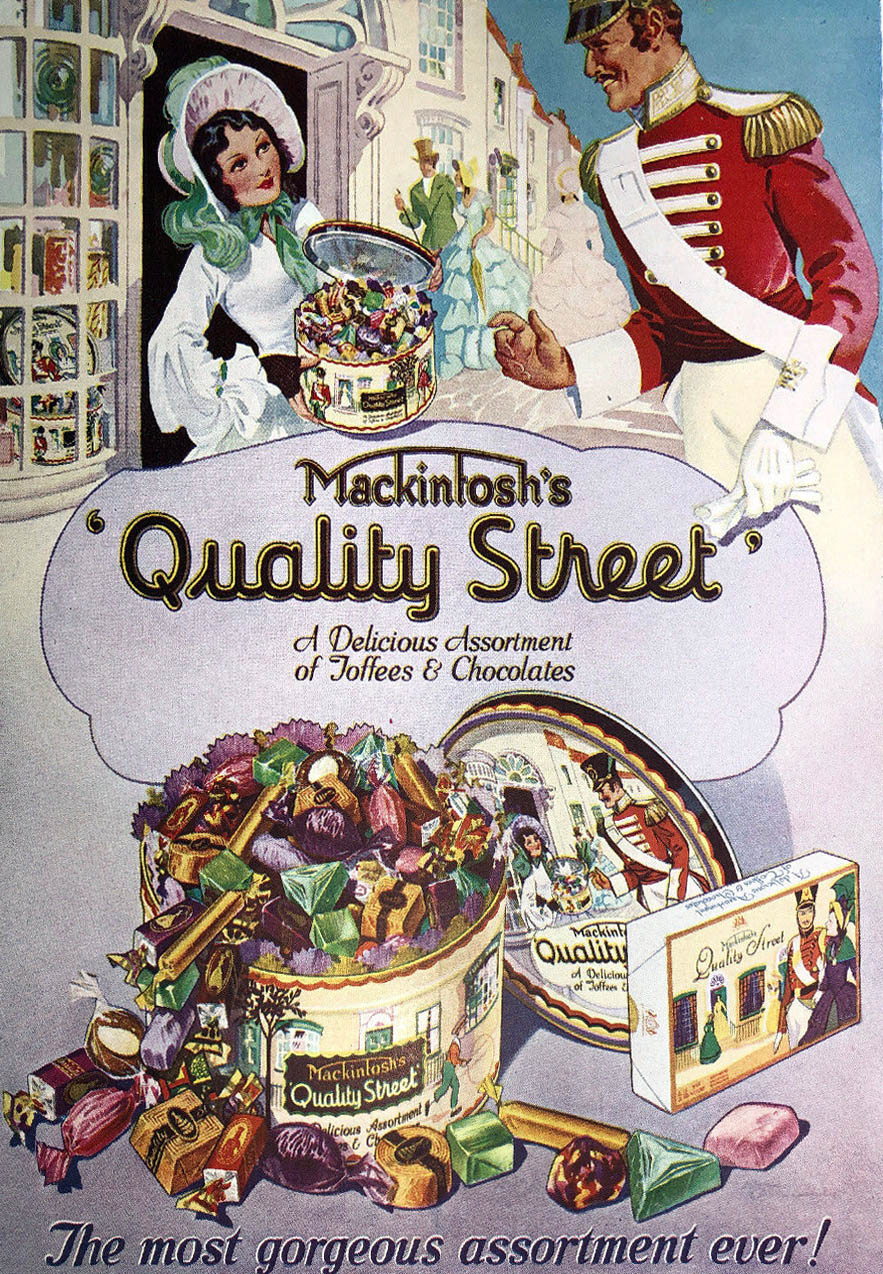
Mackintosh's Quality Street ad, 1936

Quality Street is a line of tinned and boxed toffees, chocolates and sweets, first manufactured in 1936 by Mackintosh's in Halifax, West Yorkshire, England. It was named after J. M. Barrie's play Quality Street. Since 1988, the confectionery has been produced by Nestlé. Quality Street has long been a competitor to Cadbury Roses, which were launched by Cadbury in 1938.

== History ==
In 1890, John Mackintosh and his wife opened a shop in Halifax, West Yorkshire, England, where they created a new kind of sweet by mixing hard toffee with runny caramel. The toffees were made from inexpensive local ingredients such as milk, sugar beet and eggs. They were so successful that they expanded the operation by building the world's first toffee factory in 1898. It burned down in 1909, so Mackintosh bought an old carpet factory and converted it into a new facility. When John Mackintosh died, his son Harold inherited the business and, in 1936, he invented Quality Street. The name was inspired by the play of the same name by J. M. Barrie.

In the early 1930s, only the wealthy could afford boxed chocolates made from exotic ingredients from around the world and with elaborate packaging that often cost as much as the chocolates themselves. Harold Mackintosh set out to produce boxes of chocolates that could be sold at a reasonable price and would, therefore, be available to working-class families. His idea was to cover the different toffees with chocolate and present them in low-cost yet attractive boxes.

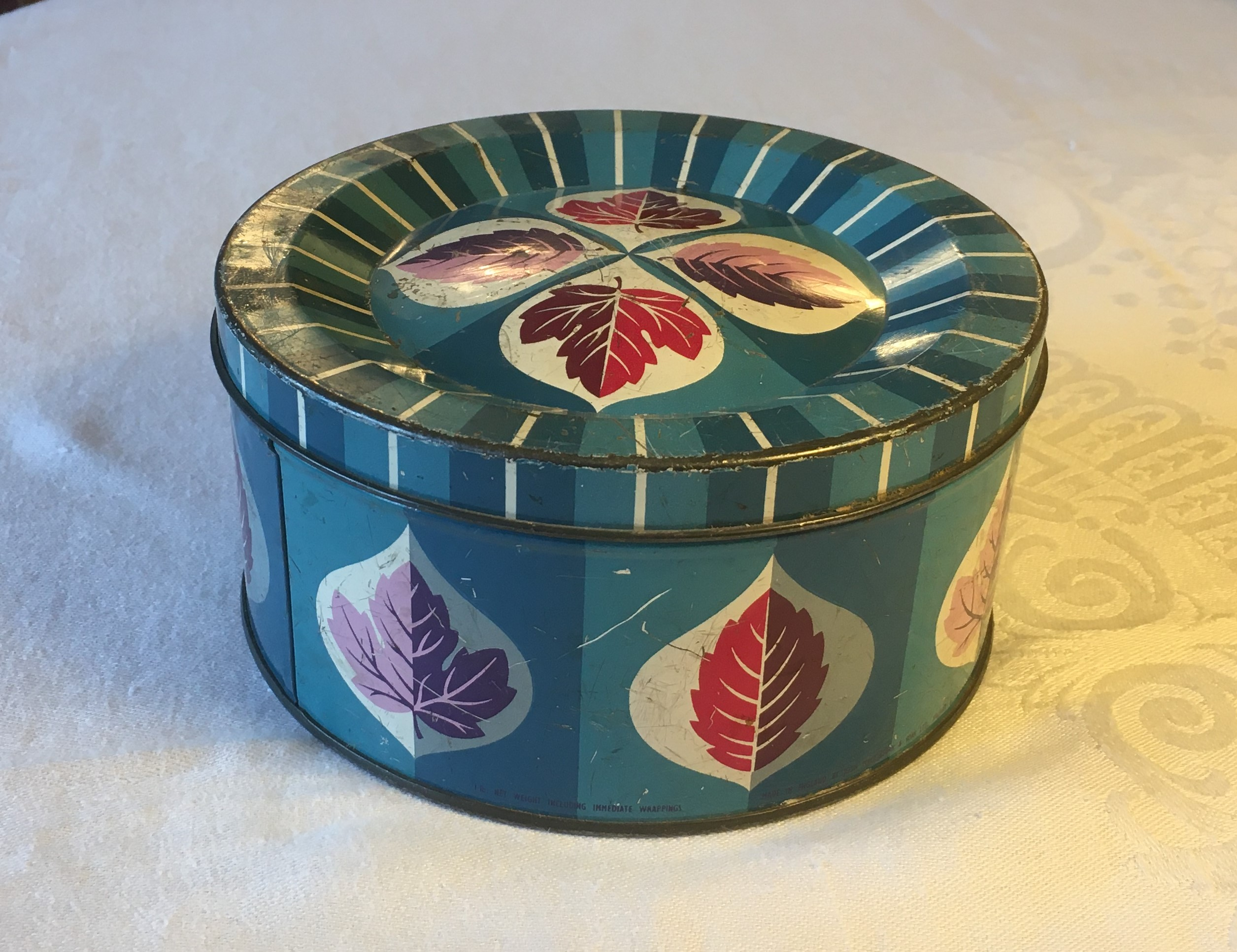
Mackintosh's Quality Street tin, 1950s

Rather than having each piece separated in the box, which would require more costly packaging, Mackintosh decided to wrap each piece individually in coloured paper and put them into a decorative tin. He also introduced new technology, the world's first twist-wrapping machine, to wrap each chocolate in a distinctive wrapper. Mackintosh utilised a tin, rather than a cardboard box, as he wanted the chocolate aroma to emerge as soon as the container was opened. The intention was to use different textures, colours, shapes, and sizes of the sweets to make opening the tin and consuming its contents a noisy, vibrant experience that the whole family could enjoy.

In the later 1930s, Britain was still feeling the effects of the economic crash and Mackintosh realised that in times of economic hardship and war, people crave nostalgia. Quality Street chocolates were, therefore, packaged in brightly coloured tins featuring two characters in traditional dress, known affectionately as Miss Sweetly and Major Quality, inspired by the principal characters from J.M. Barrie's play. They featured on all Quality Street boxes and tins until 2000. The original models for the pair were Tony and Iris Coles, the children of Sydney Coles, who designed the advertising campaign that first appeared on a front-page newspaper advertisement in the Daily Mail on 2 May 1936.

The artist, Harold Oakes of Halifax, worked for many years in the packaging and design department of Mackintosh's. He produced the first illustrations of the two Regency style characters who became synonymous with the Quality Street selection.

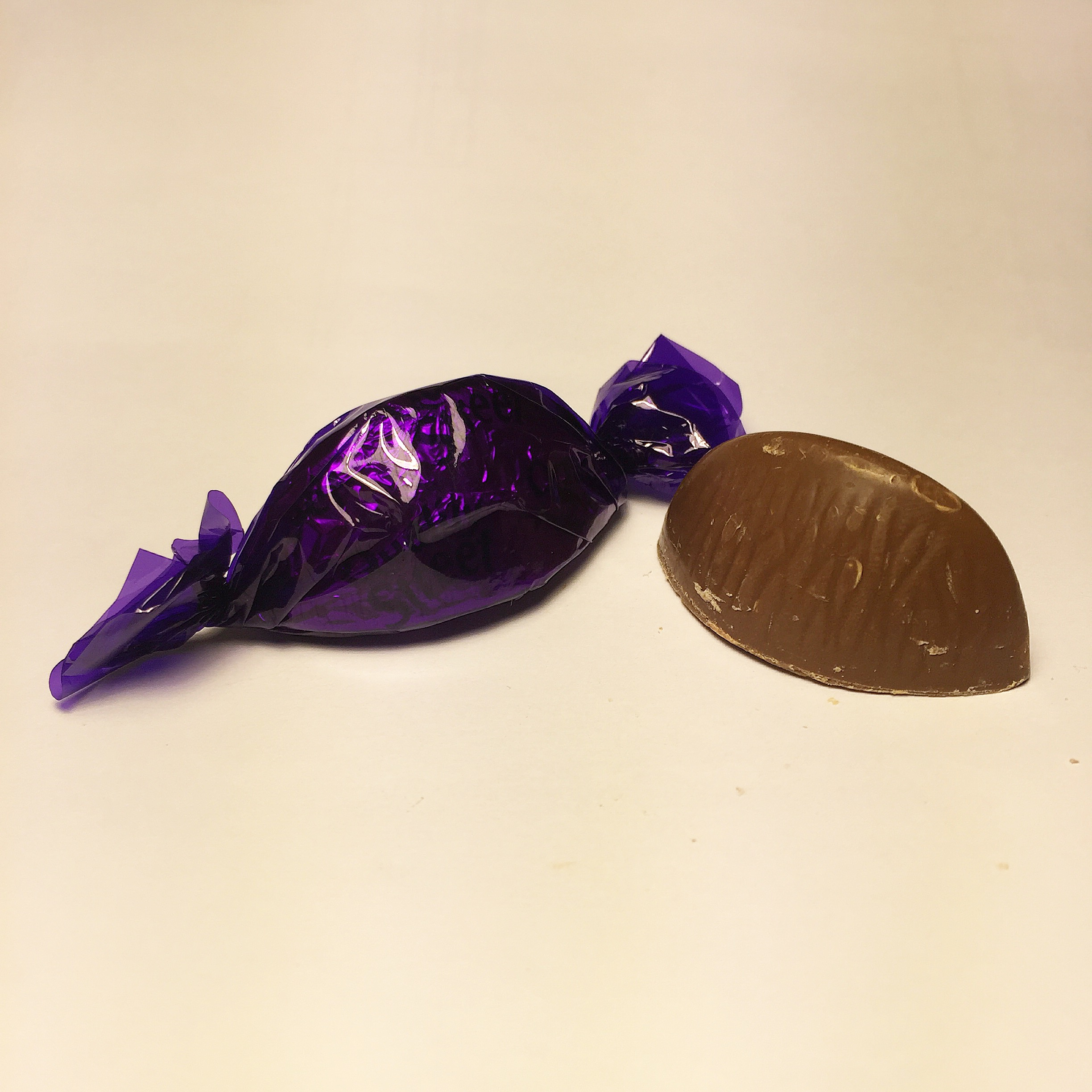
"The Purple One"

The brand was acquired by Nestlé when they bought Rowntree Mackintosh in 1988.

Individual larger versions of the more popular chocolates are now manufactured and sold separately, as an extension to the brand, such as a bar based on the Purple One.

In Western Norway, Quality Street is called "Shetlandsgodt" or, more commonly, "Shetland Snoops" (Shetland Sweets), because it was often brought home by fishermen visiting Shetland. In Iceland, it is traditionally known as "Mackintosh".

Quality Street gained the implied endorsement of Saddam Hussein when the Iraqi leader was reported to have offered them to visiting British politician George Galloway in 2002. Nestlé were initially positive, but then chose to backtrack about the connection.

== Contents ==
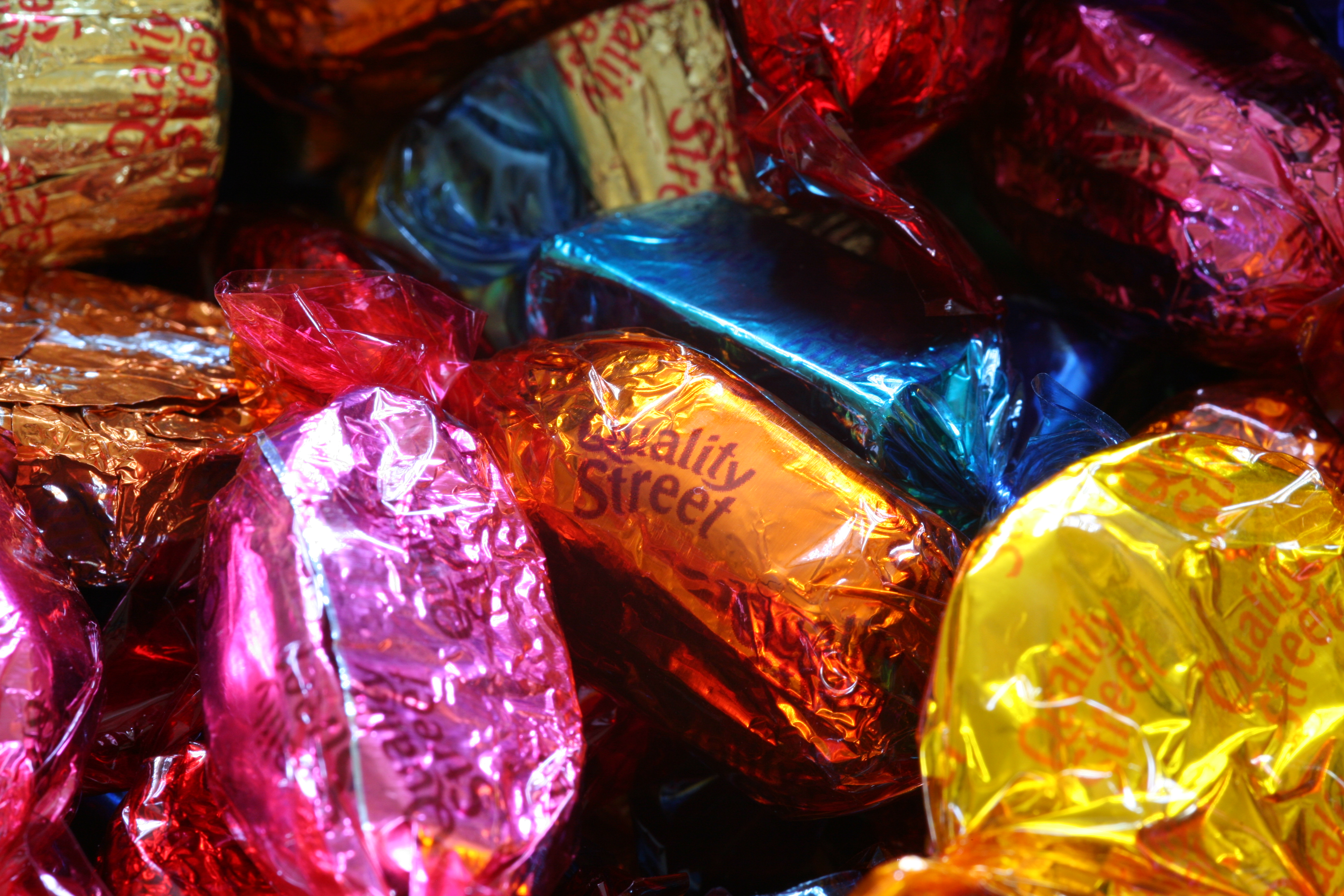
Assortment in colourful wrappers

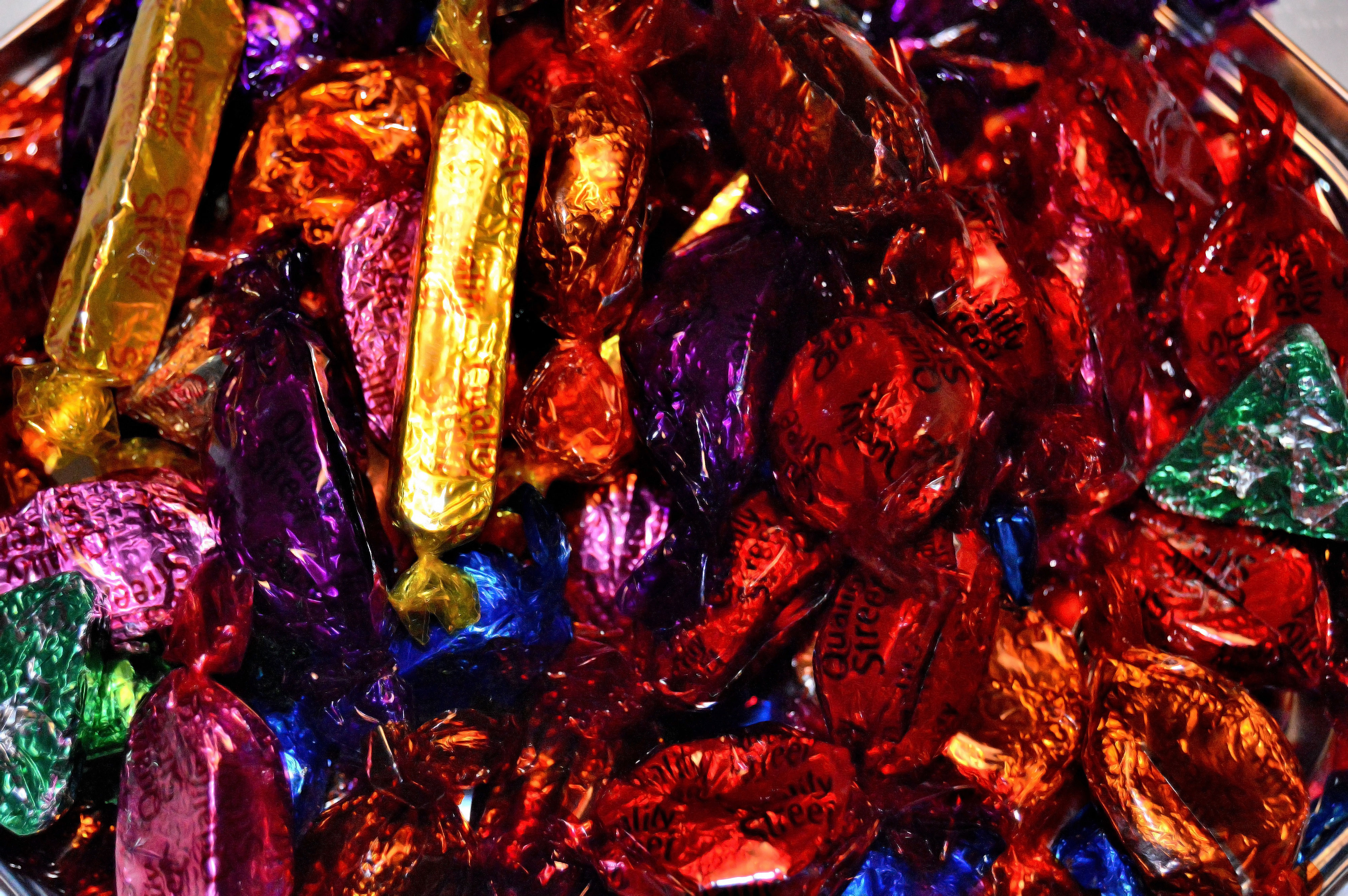
Toffee Finger (gold wrapper) among the sweets

The sweets within the box have changed over the years. As of September 2019, there are 15 flavours (including the Fruit Cremes box exclusive, John Lewis exclusive, and Matchmakers) of the individually wrapped sweets, all of which are either chocolate or toffee based, as follows:

=== Current varieties ===
==== In tin ====
- "The Purple One" (previously known as Hazel in Caramel) – milk chocolate filled with hazelnut and caramel (purple wrapper)
- "The Green Triangle" (previously known as Noisette Triangle) – milk chocolate filled with hazelnut praline (green wrapper, foil)
- Toffee Finger (gold wrapper, stick)
- Strawberry Delight (red wrapper, circular)
- Caramel Swirl (yellow wrapper, circular, foil)
- Milk Choc Block (green wrapper)
- Orange Chocolate Crunch (orange wrapper, octagonal, foil)
- Orange Creme (orange wrapper)
- Fudge (pink wrapper)
- Coconut Eclair (blue wrapper)
- Toffee Penny (gold wrapper, circular, no chocolate coating)
- Coffee Creme (brown wrapper, available in certain stores)

The Toffee Penny wrapper presented a challenge for a number of years because, unlike the relatively shelf-stable chocolate, the cellophane wrapper would stick to the toffee confection over time due to its hygroscopic properties. Following a suggestion by packaging manufacturer William T. Robson OBE, a new barrier material of foil backed paper was adopted by Mackintosh in 1967 to overcome the problem. "Robson Wrap" was a huge success and became a signature of the brand after being rolled out in one variation or another to several different flavours.

In 2022, Nestlé announced that they would replace plastic wrappings with recyclable paper versions, with the intention of keeping two billion wrappers a year out of landfill.

==== Sold separately ====
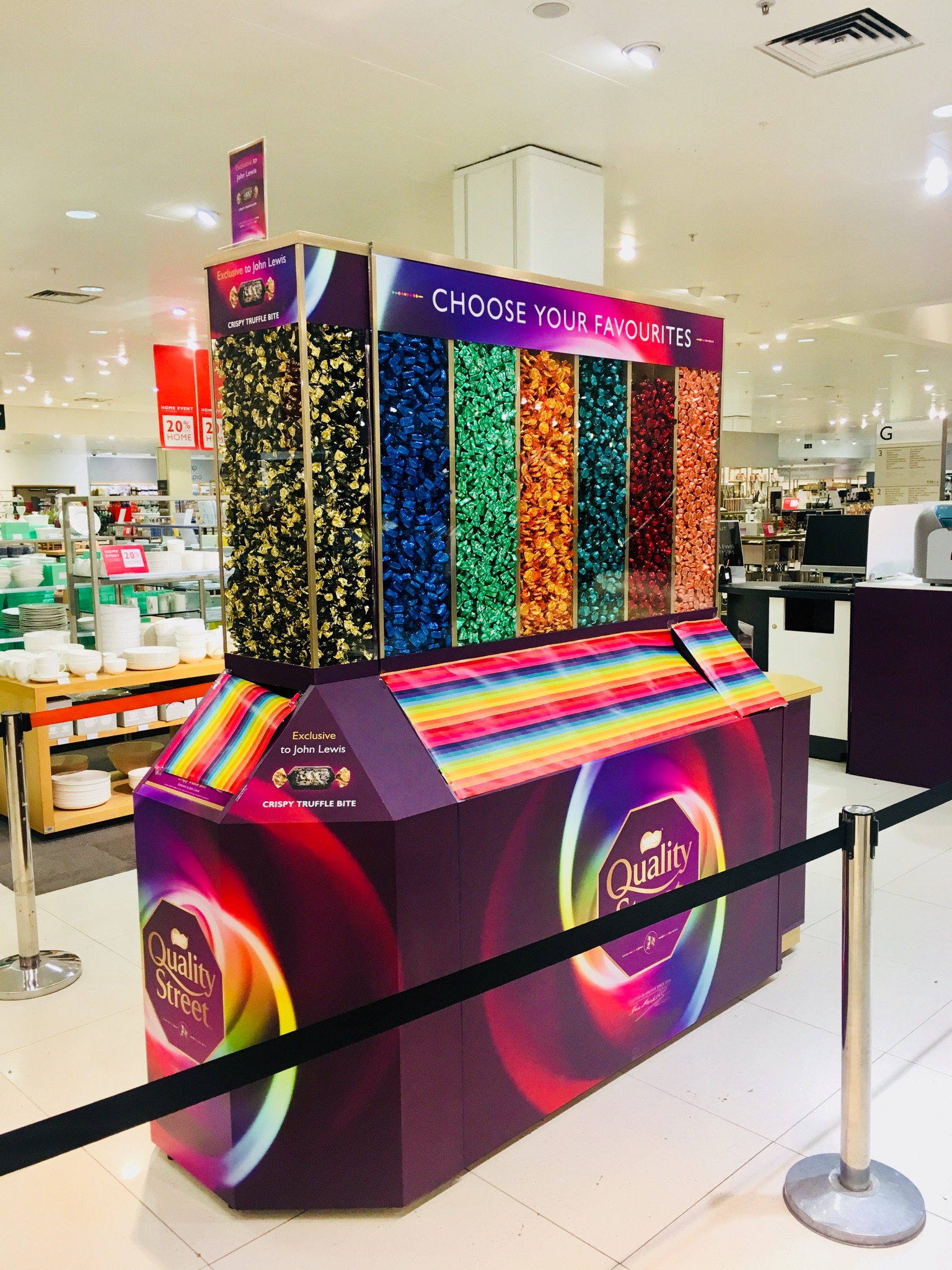
Quality Street exhibitor at John Lewis & Partners, Cardiff, 2019

- Lemon Zing (yellow wrapper, fruit cremes box only or in 2022 Spring Edition pouch)
- Matchmakers (sold separately as Cool Mint, Zingy Orange, Yummy Honeycomb, Salted Caramel, Gingerbread and Maple & Pecan)
- Intrigue Truffles sold separately as Praline, Salted Caramel and Orange (Salted Caramel and Praline are sold at both Asda and Morrisons stores, whereas Orange is sold at Asda only)

On 15 August 2013, the My Green Bar became available from Nestlé, which consisted of four original green noisette pâté triangles held together by milk chocolate. This was also available in My Purple Bar.

=== Discontinued varieties ===
- Purple One (the original 'Purple One' with Brazil nut, replaced with hazelnut version)
- Chocolate Strawberry Cream (now replaced with Strawberry Delight)
- Chocolate Toffee Cup (now replaced with Caramel Swirl)
- Hazelnut Cracknell (red wrapper)
- Hazelnut Éclair
- Honeycomb crunch (Discontinued in 2018 to re-introduce Toffee Deluxe)
- Chocolate Nut Toffee Cream
- Malt Toffee (replaced with Toffee Deluxe as a "new" flavour)
- Milk Chocolate Round (now replaced with Milk Choc Block in green wrapper)
- Peanut Cracknell (blue wrapper)
- Almond Octagon (purple wrapper, replaced with Vanilla Octagon, but the latter is now discontinued as well)
- Gooseberry Cream (green wrapper light green fondant with a touch of Gooseberry Preserve covered in milk chocolate)
- Fig Fancy (light brown wrapper)
- Apricot Delight (blue wrapper, square chunk, apricot flavoured jelly covered in milk chocolate)
- Toffee Square (metallic pink wrapper, a small square of very hard toffee)
- Chocolate Truffle (brown square chunk, a soft truffle filling covered in milk chocolate)
- Montelimar Nougat
- Harrogate Toffee
- Fruits of the Forest Creme (pale purple wrapper)
- Smarties (ordinary cardboard box of Smarties, a 2004 promotion only)
- Coffee Cream (brown wrapper, same size and shape as the strawberry cream)
- Mint Fondant (pale green wrapper, same as strawberry crème but with a mint crème filling)
- Toffee Deluxe (replaced by Honeycomb Crunch, reintroduced and then replaced by Chocolate Caramel Brownie)
- Crispy Truffle Bite (John Lewis stores only, black and gold recyclable foil)
- Chocolate Caramel Brownie (cyan wrapper) Discontinued in 2021.

== See also ==
- Heroes (confectionery)
- Cadbury Roses
- Celebrations (confectionery)
- Quality Street (play)
