= Quality Street (play) =

1901 comedy play by Scottish writer J. M. Barrie

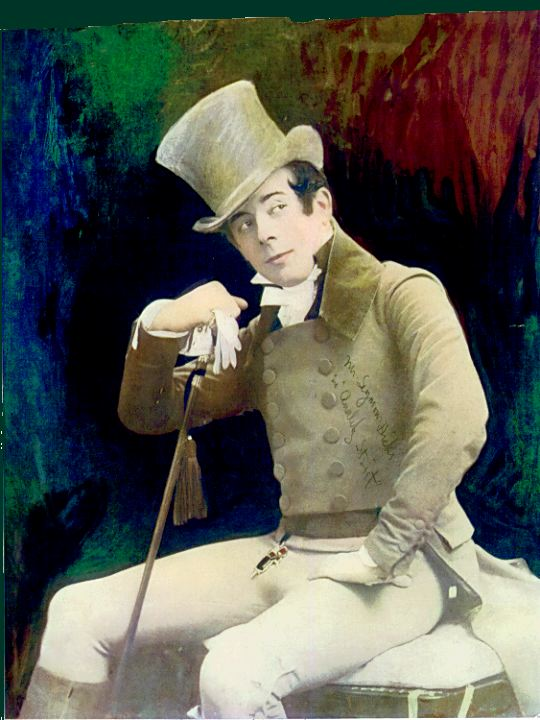
- Illustration of Seymour Hicks as Valentine Brown
- Written by: J. M. Barrie
- Characters: See below
- Genre: Comedy
- Setting: Napoleonic times

Premiere
- Date premiered: November 11, 1901
- Place premiered: Knickerbocker Theatre

Quality Street is a comedy in four acts by J. M. Barrie, written before his more famous work Peter Pan. The story is about two sisters who start a school "for genteel children".

The original Broadway production opened in 1901 and ran for 64 performances. The show was then produced in London, where it was a hit, running for 459 performances. It was frequently revived until World War II.

== Roles and 1902 London cast ==
Terriss and Hicks in Quality Street

- Valentine Brown – Suitor of Miss Phoebe – Seymour Hicks
- Miss Phoebe Throssel – A School Mistress – Ellaline Terriss
- Miss Livvy – Alter ego of Phoebe – Ellaline Terriss
- Ensign Blades – A Young Officer – Adolphus Vane-Tempest
- Lieutenant Spicer – A Young Officer – Vincent Sternroyd
- Susan Throssel – Sister to Phoebe – Marion Terry
- Patty – Maid-of-all-work in service of the Throssel sisters – Rosina Filippi
- Recruiting Sergeant – George Shelton
- A Waterloo Veteran – Charles Daly
- Arthur Wellesley Tomson – George Hersee
- Miss Willoughby – Henrietta Watson
- Miss Fanny Willoughby – Irene Rooke
- Miss Henrietta Turnbull – Constance Hyem
- Miss Charlotte Parratt – May Taverner
- Isabella – Winifred Hall
- Harriett – Edith Heslewood

== Plot ==
The play is set in Napoleonic times.

Act 1

There is heightened anticipation as the local gossips of the town discuss the developing relationship between Miss Phoebe Throssel and Valentine Brown. Phoebe then confesses to her sister, Susan, that Brown intends to drop by later that day, and both are certain he means to propose. When he finally does appear, it is not to ask for Phoebe's hand in marriage but to announce his intention to join the fight in Europe against Napoleon. This leaves the girls devastated.

Act 2

Ten years after the departure of Brown, we find the girls have set up a school in order to pay the rent. Phoebe has not accepted any other suitor and has allowed herself to become an "Old Maid" and school mistress. Phoebe, however, longs for her youth, and the return of Captain Brown only deepens her melancholy. "I am tired of being lady-like," she declares. With some encouragement from her maid, Patty, she creates the fictional character of Miss Livvy, a more energetic, flirtatious and naughty version of her younger self, and begins to tease Captain Brown who, captivated by her, persuades her and Susan to accompany him to the ball.

Act 3

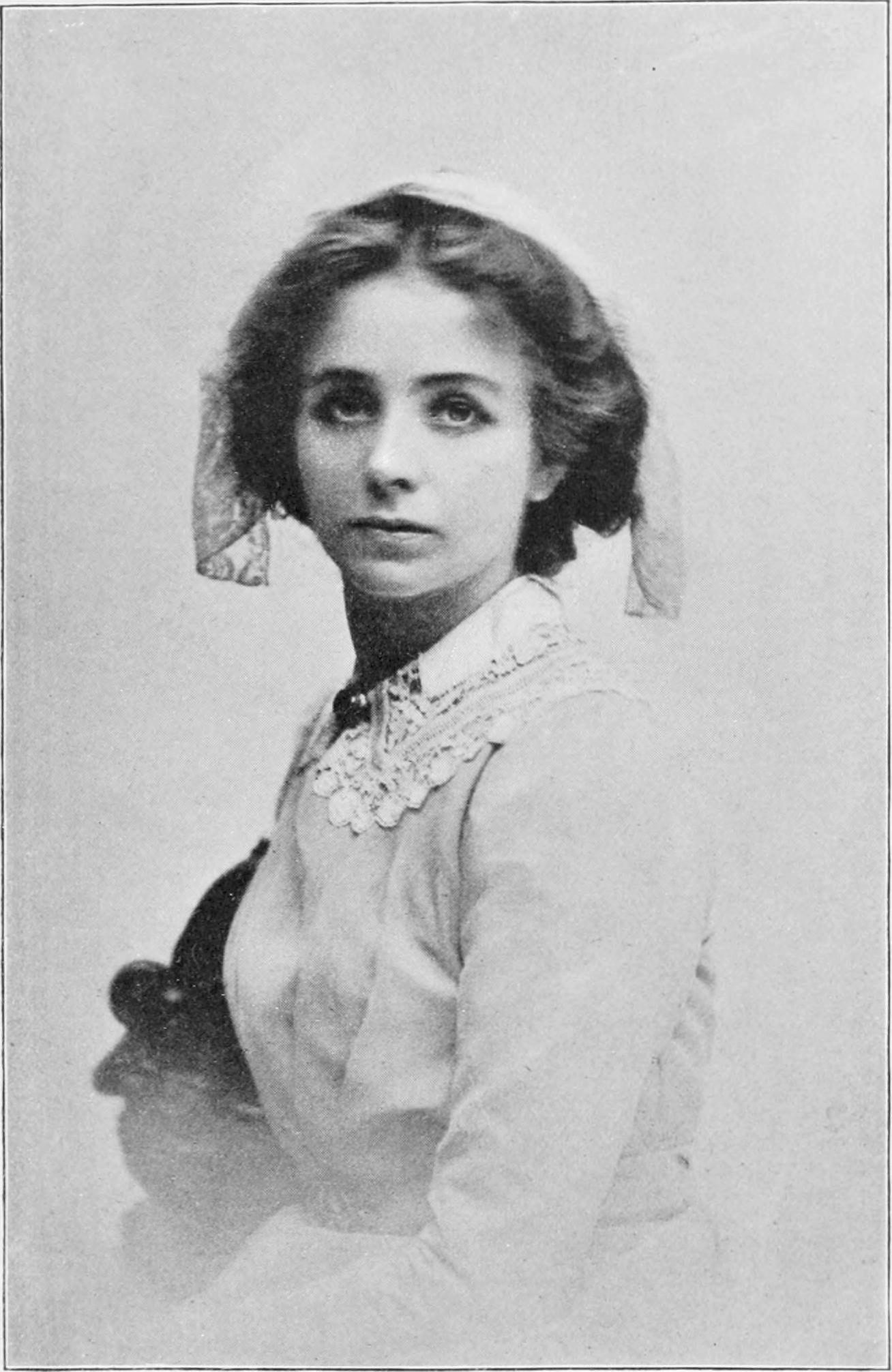
Maude Adams as Phoebe in the 1901 Broadway production

At the ball, and Phoebe is still playing the part of Miss Livvy. In this guise, she has captured the eyes of many of the young men and the scorn of ladies. However, Phoebe is now annoyed that Brown seems to prefer this unsubstantial 'young' flirt that she has created to her true personality and qualities. Her actions cause events to come to a head as her act is almost brought to light by the local gossiping girls Fanny Willoughby and Henrietta Turnbull. In a final confrontation with Captain Brown, we discover that he has found his love for Miss Phoebe and not for Miss Livvy, as he insists that "I have discovered for myself that the schoolmistress in her old maid's cap is the noblest Miss Phoebe of them all."

Act 4

Miss Livvy still hangs heavy over the sisters: having been created, she is now difficult to dispose of. The local gossips watch for any sign of Miss Livvy and frequently visit the sisters' home. Brown comes to ask for Phoebe’s hand and is turned down without explanation. As a result, he becomes aware of the disguise and the sisters' plight and sets out to right all wrongs, even his own.

== Productions ==
The play opened on October 11, 1901, at the Valentine Theatre in Toledo, Ohio, and arrived in New York to play at the Knickerbocker Theatre on November 11, 1901, produced by Charles Frohman and starring Maude Adams, running for a modestly successful 64 performances. It then opened at the Vaudeville Theatre in London on 17 September 1902 and ran for a very successful 459 performances, starring Ellaline Terriss, Seymour Hicks (Terriss's husband) and Marion Terry, making it one of the first American productions to score a bigger triumph in London than in New York.

The piece enjoyed numerous revivals and tours until World War II. These included a 1913 revival at London's Duke of York's Theatre. A brief revival played in 1908 at the Empire Theatre in New York, starring Adams, and other revivals followed in America, at least into the 1920s.

In 2010, London's Finborough Theatre mounted the first professional production of the piece in London in over six decades. In 2020, Northern Broadsides performed the play at the Viaduct Theatre in Halifax, directed by Laurie Sansom, with the addition of commentary from present-day employees at the Quality Street chocolates factory. It toured to The Lowry, Salford; The Dukes, Lancaster; and the Theatre Royal, Bury St Edmunds, before closing due to the coronavirus pandemic.

== Adaptations and legacy ==
The play was adapted twice for film; the first, in 1927 starred Marion Davies, and the second, in 1937, starred Katharine Hepburn. A musical theatre adaptation, Dear Miss Phoebe, written by Christopher Hassall and Harry Parr Davies, premiered in 1950.

The play's name was taken for a brand of chocolates and caramels now owned by Nestlé. Characters from the play were used in the company's advertising and on packaging.

When Hicks and Terriss moved to a new home, The Old Forge at Merstham, Surrey, their cul-de-sac was renamed "Quality Street".
