= Quality Street (1937 film) =

1937 film by George Stevens

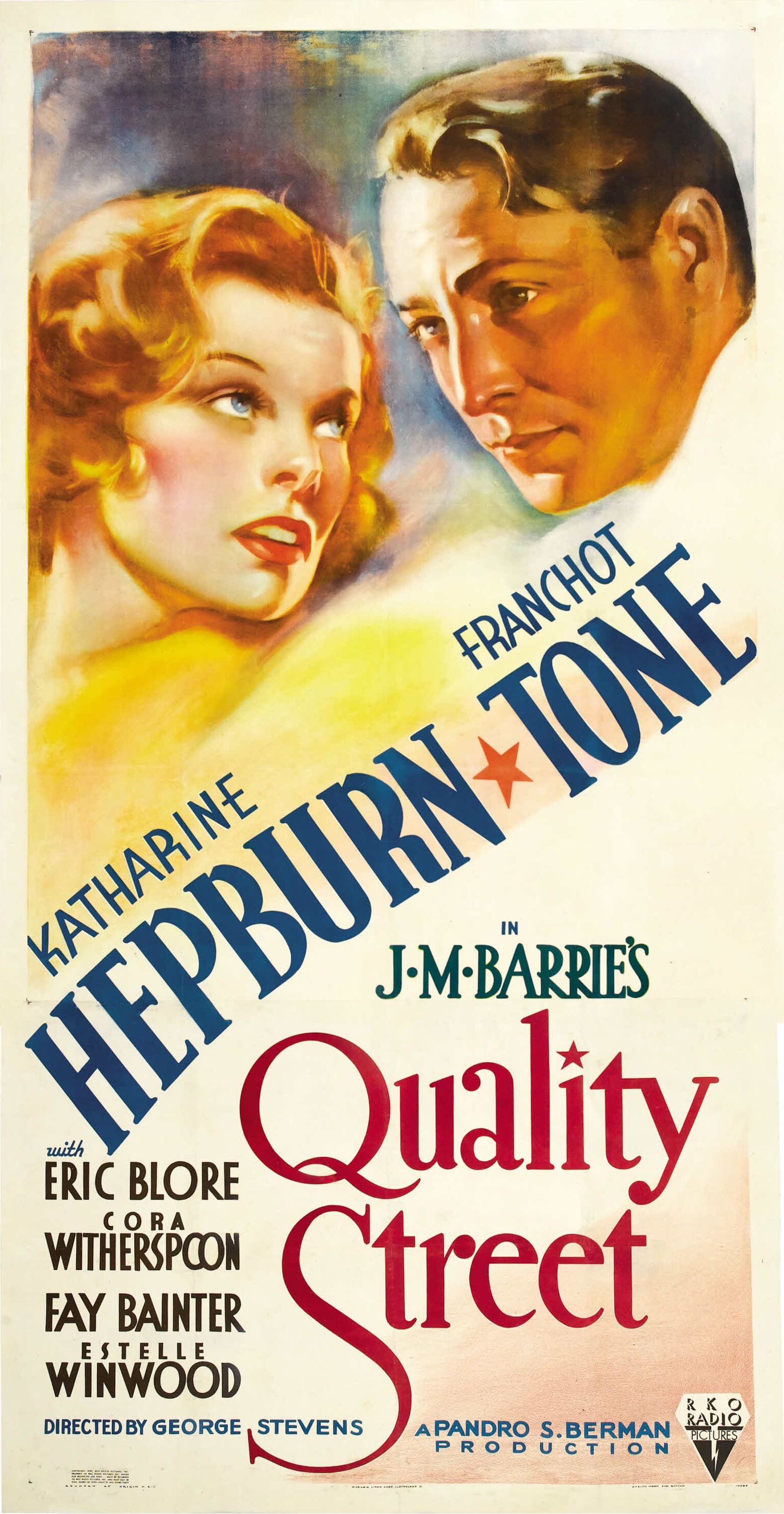
- Original poster
- Directed by: George Stevens
- Written by: Allan Scott; Mortimer Offner
- Based on: Quality Street; 1901 play by J.M. Barrie
- Produced by: Pandro S. Berman
- Starring: Katharine Hepburn; Franchot Tone; Eric Blore; Cora Witherspoon; Fay Bainter; Estelle Winwood
- Cinematography: Robert De Grasse
- Edited by: Henry Berman
- Music by: Roy Webb
- Production company: RKO Radio Pictures
- Distributed by: RKO Radio Pictures
- Release date: March 26, 1937
- Running time: 83 minutes
- Country: United States
- Language: English

Quality Street is a 1937 American historical comedy film made by RKO Radio Pictures. It was directed by George Stevens and produced by Pandro S. Berman. Set in 19th-century England, the film stars Katharine Hepburn and Franchot Tone. Joan Fontaine makes one of her early (uncredited) film appearances. The screenplay was by Allan Scott, Mortimer Offner, and Jack Townley, based on the 1901 play Quality Street by J. M. Barrie.

This 1937 version was filmed at the RKO Encino movie ranch, RKO Forty Acres backlot, and RKO Hollywood Studios. Quality Street was a box office failure, recording a loss of $248,000. It was Katharine Hepburn's fourth flop film in a row for RKO Pictures, which added to Miss Hepburn’s label as "box office poison" by the 1938 national group of movie exhibitors.

Roy Webb's music was nominated for the Academy Award for Best Score.

== Plot ==
In 1805 England, eligible bachelors are scarce on Quality Street. Twenty-year-old Phoebe Throssel becomes very hopeful when one of the few, Dr. Valentine Brown, tells her he has something important to say to her that day. Both she and her older sister Susan believe he will propose. However, he informs her that he has enlisted in the army to fight in the Napoleonic Wars. Phoebe hides her devastation so well that Dr. Brown never suspects she is deeply in love with him. She gives up hope of ever marrying. By contrast, the Throssels' servant Patty, though she is a decade older and aware she is no beauty, is confident that she will get a man.

For the next ten years, the Throssels run a school for young boys and girls. Then, with the wars over, Brown returns as a captain. When he comes to invite the sisters to a ball, he is taken aback by how much Phoebe's looks appear to have deteriorated. Hurt by this, Phoebe declines.

To lift her spirits, Phoebe sheds her drab everyday clothes and dresses up in a beautiful gown. When Brown returns unexpectedly, Patty thinks quickly and identifies her as Phoebe's niece Livy. Taken in completely, Brown invites her to the ball. She accepts, planning to make him eventually fall in love with her, then when he proposes, reject him.

At the ball, she is quickly surrounded by admirers, much to Brown's annoyance. In the days that follow, she flirts with all the men. Finally, at a party, Brown approaches Livy. To her shock, instead of asking for her hand in marriage, he merely lectures her on her behavior and reveals that he is in love with Phoebe.

The next day, the Throssels have to fend off their neighbors, the Willougbys, who suspect that Livy and Phoebe are one and the same, particularly elderly Mary Willoughby. When Brown comes calling, the Willoughbys mention their suspicions. He eventually corners Patty and gets the truth from her. With the help of the sergeant who first recruited him, he puts clothes around a large seat cushion and puts "Livy" in a carriage to return home, all in sight of the snooping neighbors. He tells the sergeant and Patty to get rid of the "niece" and not to return until much later. The couple are delighted to spend time together. Brown goes inside and embraces Phoebe.

== Cast ==
- Katharine Hepburn as Phoebe Throssel
- Franchot Tone as Dr. Valentine Brown
- Eric Blore as Recruiting Sergeant
- Fay Bainter as Susan Throssel
- Cora Witherspoon as Patty
- Estelle Winwood as Mary Willoughby
- Helena Grant as Fanny Willoughby (uncredited)
- Florence Lake as Henrietta Turnbull (uncredited)
- Joan Fontaine as Charlotte Parratt (uncredited)
- Bonita Granville as Isabella (uncredited)
- Clifford Severn as Arthur, school bully (uncredited)

== See also ==
- Quality Street (1927 film)
- Quality Street (play)
