= Rolo =

Chocolate-covered caramel confectionery

Rolo Chocolate Brand
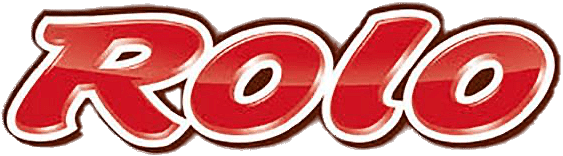

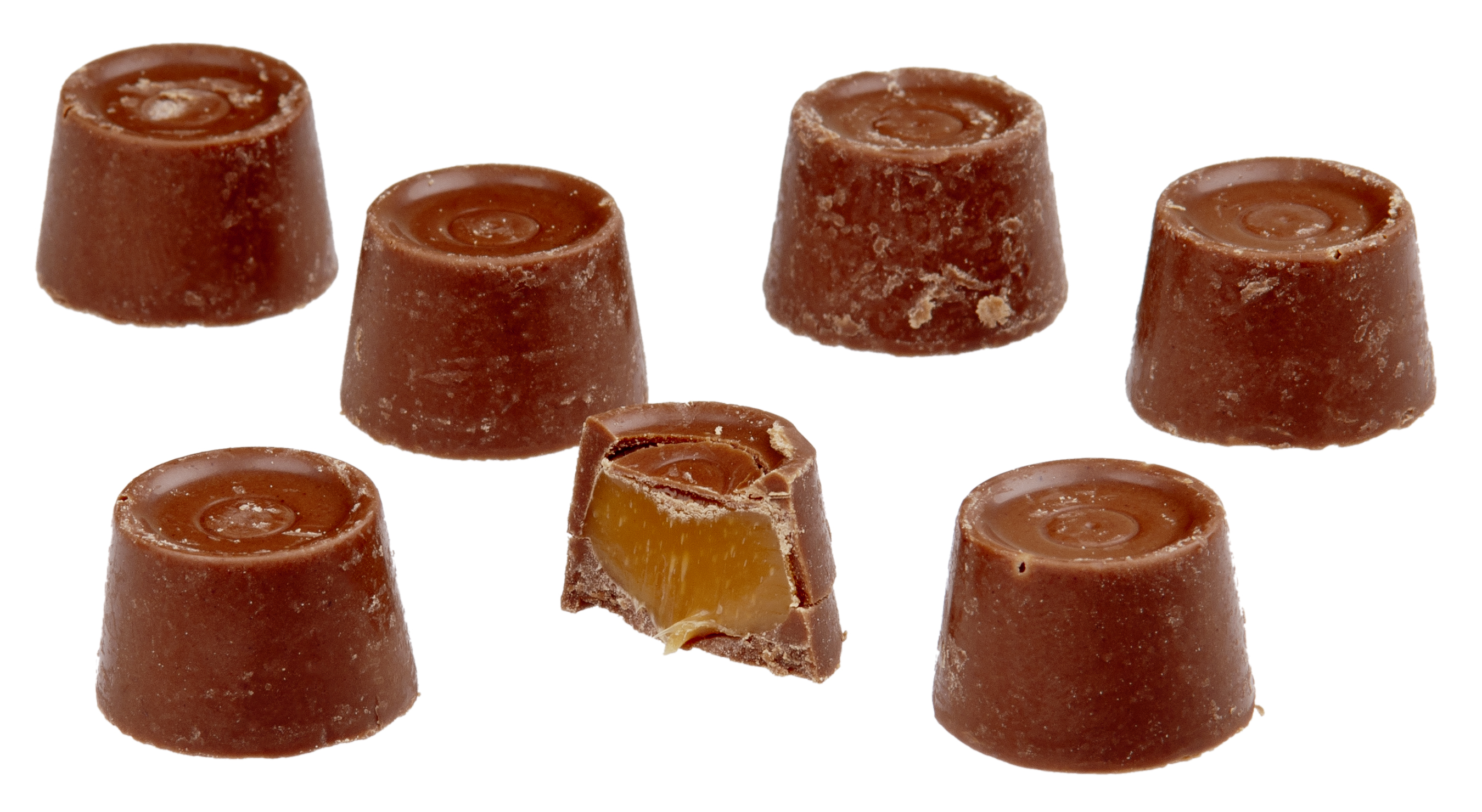
- Current owner: Nestlé (worldwide, except in the U.S.); The Hershey Company (U.S. only)
- Country: United Kingdom
- Introduced: December 1937; 88 years ago
- Related brands: Kit Kat
- Previous owners: Mackintosh's
- Website: Official website

Rolo (/ˈroʊloʊ/ ROH-loh) is a brand of truncated cone-shaped or conical frustum-shaped chocolates with a caramel inside. First manufactured in Norwich, Norfolk, in the United Kingdom by Mackintosh's in 1937 (followed by Rowntree's after the takeover in 1969), they are made by Nestlé (except in the United States, where production has been licensed to the Hershey Company).

A long-running British advertising slogan for the brand was "Do you love anyone enough to give them your last Rolo?" A YouGov poll saw Rolo ranked the eleventh most popular and seventeenth most famous confectionery in the UK.

== History ==
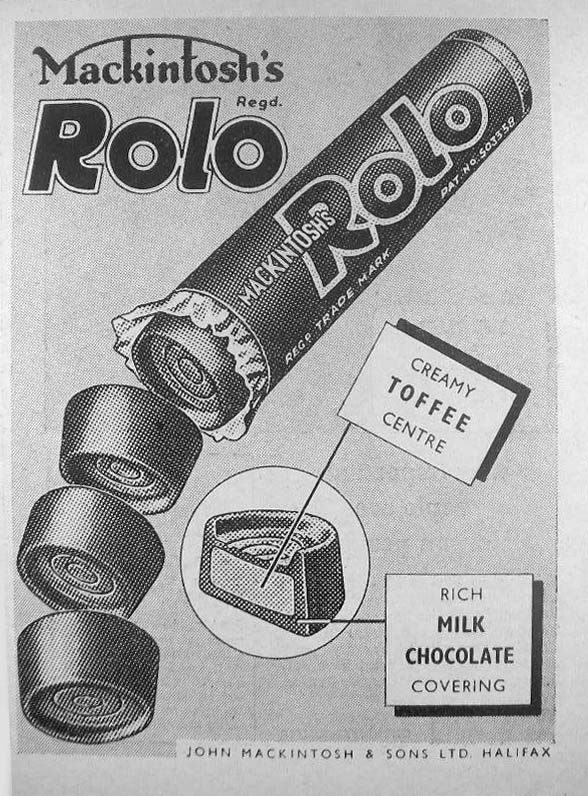
Mackintosh's 1949 Rolo advertisement in the UK

The Rolo product was developed in England by Mackintosh's, (later Rowntree-Mackintosh), simply a combination of caramel and a chocolate coating. Rolo was launched in the United Kingdom in 1937.

In 1956, the New England Confectionery Company acquired a licence to produce Rolos in the US. In 1969, the licence for US manufacturing was acquired by the Hershey Company.

In 1988, the Nestlé company acquired Rowntree and its brands, including Rolo. There have now been Rolo biscuits, ice-cream, muffins, birthday cake, desserts, cake bars, doughnuts, mini Rolos, big Rolos (all of which use the same type of caramel), yogurts, and Easter eggs made. In May 2011, McDonald's combined chocolate pieces and caramel sauce with their soft-serve McFlurry product to simulate the Rolo flavour profile in a cross-branded product. In December 2018, Walmart began selling Rolo ice cream cones and ice cream sandwiches in their stores.

In the UK, Rolos are produced at Nestlé's Halifax factory in West Yorkshire.

== Advertising ==
In 1996, the Rolo advertisement "Elephant" won the Grand Prix in the section Film Lions at the Cannes Lions International Advertising Festival. In the advertisement, an elephant gets fooled by a young boy and decades later takes revenge, referring to the saying "elephants never forget".

From 1980 to 2003, Rolo was advertised with the slogan "Do you love anyone enough to give them your last Rolo?"

== See also ==
- List of chocolate bar brands
