= Mackintosh's =

Former British confectionery company

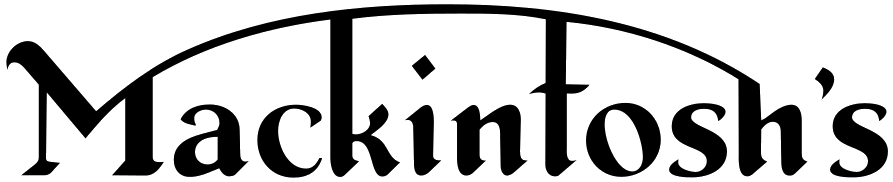
- Type: Private
- Industry: Confectionery
- Founded: 1890; 136 years ago in Halifax, Yorkshire, England
- Founders: John Mackintosh; Violet Mackintosh
- Defunct: 1969; 57 years ago
- Fate: Merged with Rowntree's
- Successor: Rowntree Mackintosh Confectionery
- Headquarters: Halifax, West Yorkshire, United Kingdom
- Products: Mackintosh's Toffee
- Brands: Mackintosh's Toffee; Caramac; Quality Street; Rolo

Mackintosh's (/ˈmækɪntɒʃɪz/ MAH-kin-tosh-iz) was a British confectionery firm founded in Halifax, West Yorkshire, England. It was known for its toffee and the Quality Street and Rolo brands.

== Beginnings ==
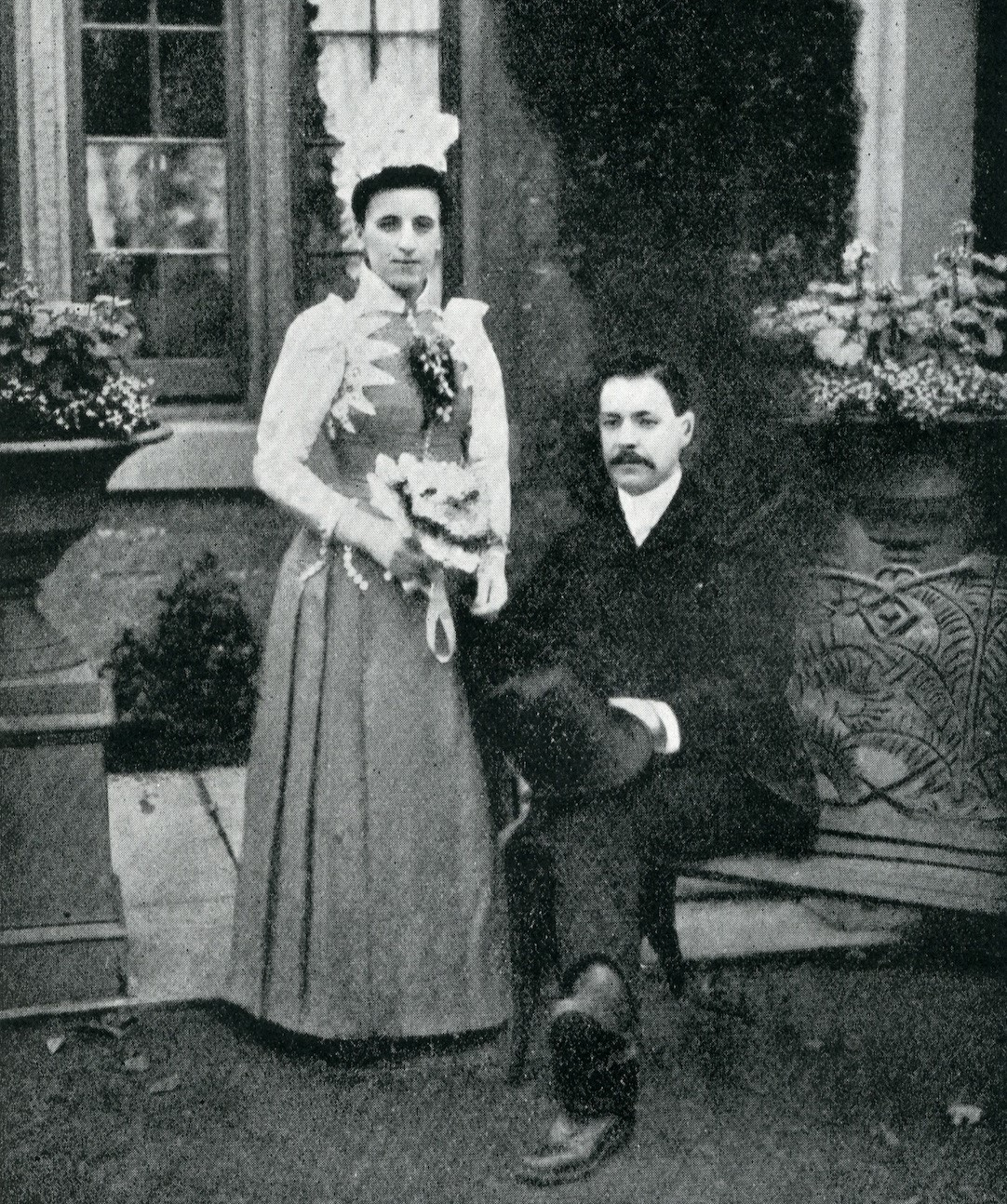
Founders John and Violet Mackintosh

The firm was founded by John Mackintosh (1868–1920) and his wife, Violet (née Taylor), who bought a pastry shop in Halifax with their joint savings of £100 in 1890, the year that they married. Violet, who had been a confectioner's assistant before her marriage, ran the shop and her husband continued to work at a cotton mill. To attract customers, they decided to sell a special toffee. Violet developed a recipe which blended the traditional, brittle English butterscotch with soft, American caramel, and they sold the toffee as Mackintosh's Celebrated Toffee. The toffee's success enabled Mackintosh to expand the business beyond Halifax by 1894. Indeed, it was so successful that it "ultimately transformed popular understanding of the term 'toffee', previously a description of any sugar or boiled sweet".

Moving from retail to manufacture and wholesale, they first rented a small warehouse in Bond Street, Halifax, and in 1895, they commenced larger-scale production at bigger premises at Hope Street. The firm was converted into a limited liability company, John Mackintosh Ltd, in 1899 raising £11,000 and borrowing a further £4,000 to build a new works at Queen's Road. When the building was destroyed by fire in 1909, the insurance payout was used to purchase the vacant Albion Mills and the Queen's Road factory was rebuilt and 1912 expanded to begin chocolate manufacture.

In 1904, Mackintosh established his first overseas factory at Asbury Park, New Jersey which, however, soon failed. Undeterred, a factory was opened in 1906 at Krefeld, near Düsseldorf. By 1914, operations had been established in Australia and Canada and John Mackintosh Ltd employed some 1000 people.

The German factory was confiscated and the number of employees fell to 250 during the First World War. In 1917 a new line was developed, a chocolate covered Toffee-De-Luxe, but all chocolate production ceased that year when a wartime conscription tribunal refused an exemption for a key manager.

== Power of publicity ==
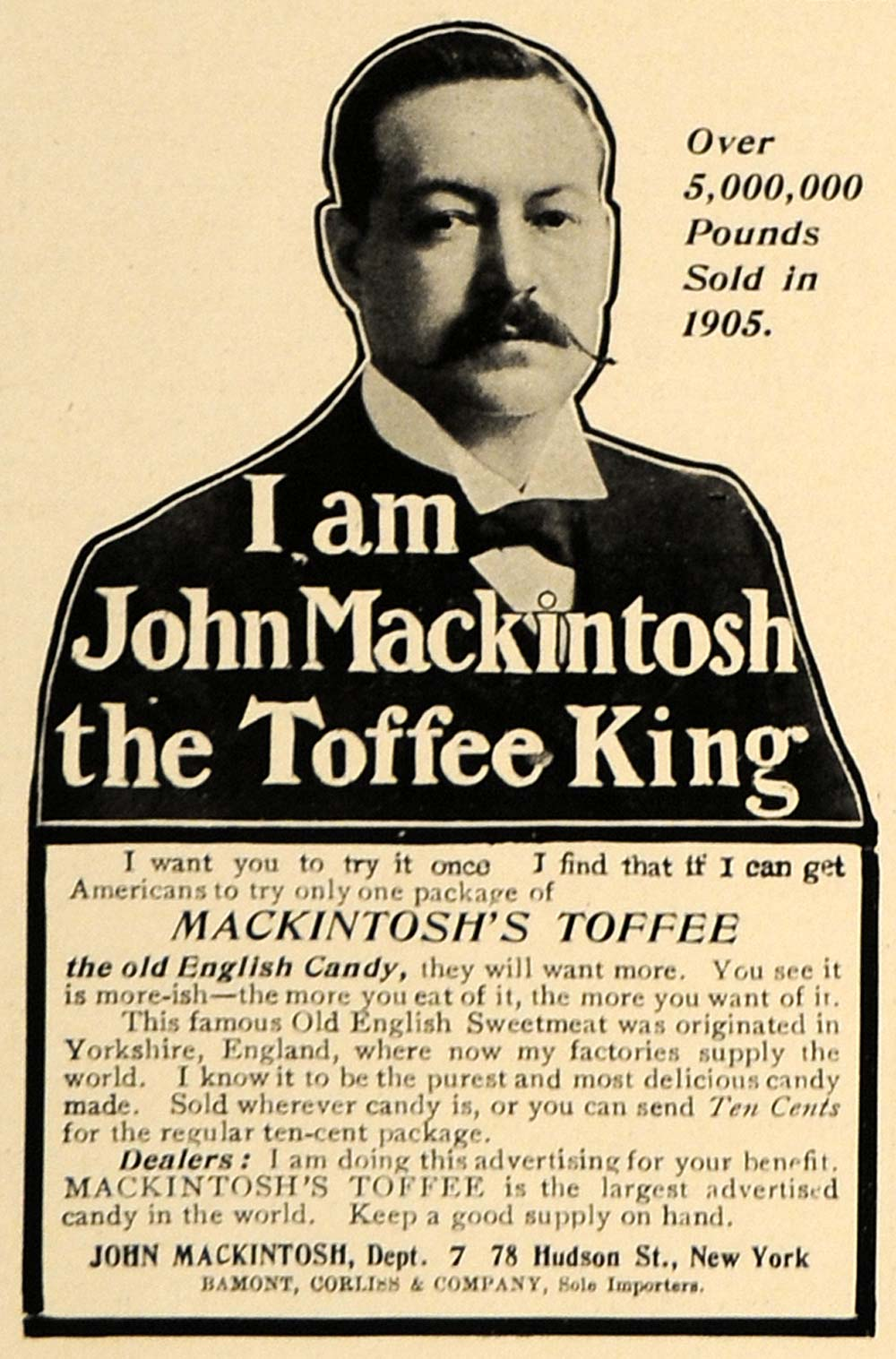
John Mackintosh depicted on a 1906 ad, calling himself "The Toffee King"

Mackintosh understood the power of marketing and publicity. He began with handbills advertising Mackintosh's Celebrated Toffee as a weekend treat targeting the Saturday afternoon market, when workers had a half-holiday and their weekly wage payment in hand. By 1896, Mackintosh was calling himself the "Toffee King" and his product "The King of All the Toffees". In 1902 the firm began consumer and coupon competitions and then national press marketing: the firm bought space in the Daily Mail, Britain's most popular mass newspaper, and it used story lines, graphics and cartoons, while his competitors still limited themselves to wordy descriptions.

== Postwar restructure and growth ==
After John Mackintosh's death in 1920, his eldest son, Harold Mackintosh took charge. The company was floated as John Mackintosh & Sons Ltd in March 1921. By paying the shareholders of the old company ordinary and preference shares in a sum greater than the issued capital of John Mackintosh Ltd., together with a substantial distribution, they controlled some 93% of the new firm; two of the founders' sons, Harold and Douglas, controlled over half the ordinary shares. To pay estate duties, the public were offered some preference shares.

The family ownership was supplemented by some key management appointments: Harold Mackintosh, chairman and managing director, took charge of purchasing; (John) Harry Guy, a Quaker and a Price Waterhouse trained accountant, became finance director (from 1922 until his death in 1955); Frank Bottomley, an old school friend of Harold, became works manager (retiring from the firm in 1966); and marketing was overseen by E. L. Fletcher, who joined the firm from the advertising agency T. B. Browne, where he had worked on the Mackintosh account.

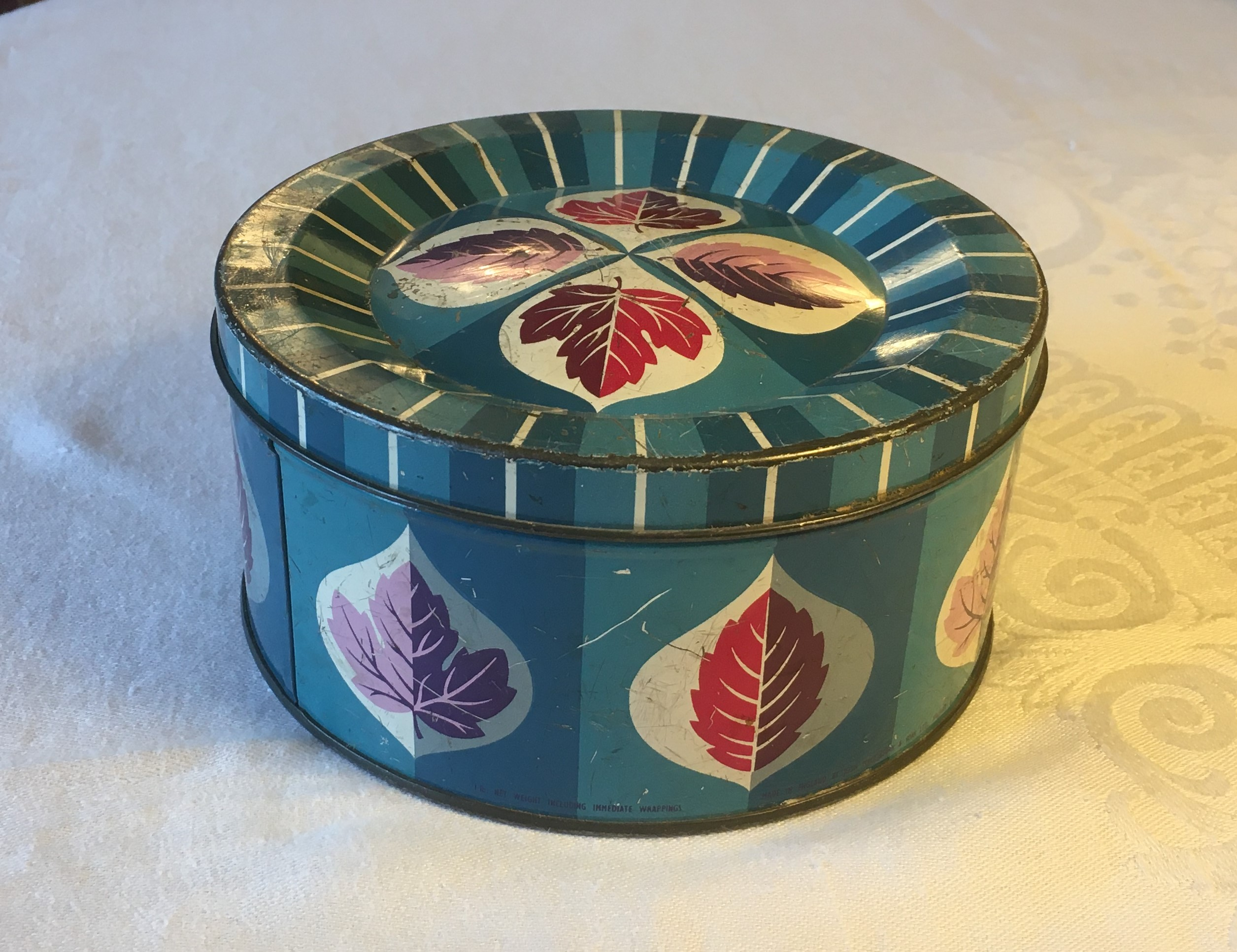
Mackintosh's Quality Street (tin of chocolates), 1950s

A series of surreal Heath Robinson cartoons of "Toffee Town" began a memorable national newspaper marketing campaign in October 1921. As the headquarters of the growing concern, Halifax became known as "Toffee Town".

Mackintosh re-entered the United States market but by 1931, it entered into an agreement with another Yorkshire company whose Toronto subsidiary manufactured its toffees on a royalty basis and exported them over the border to the United States.

The North Kerry Manufacturing Company was acquired when the firm's sales in the new Irish Free State were affected by import duties in 1924 and, in 1931, they merged their interests, with Rowntree using a holding company: Associated Chocolate and Confectionery Company.

Acquisitions were also made in the British market. In 1927, the purchase of two confectionery retailers, Meeson and Tuckshop, gave the firm direct access to consumers, some control over retail prices and diversification. In 1929, the Anglo-American Chewing Gum Ltd. (later renamed the Anglo-American Confectionery) expanded their product range and forestalled American entry into the British market with a rival chewing product.

== Caley acquisition ==
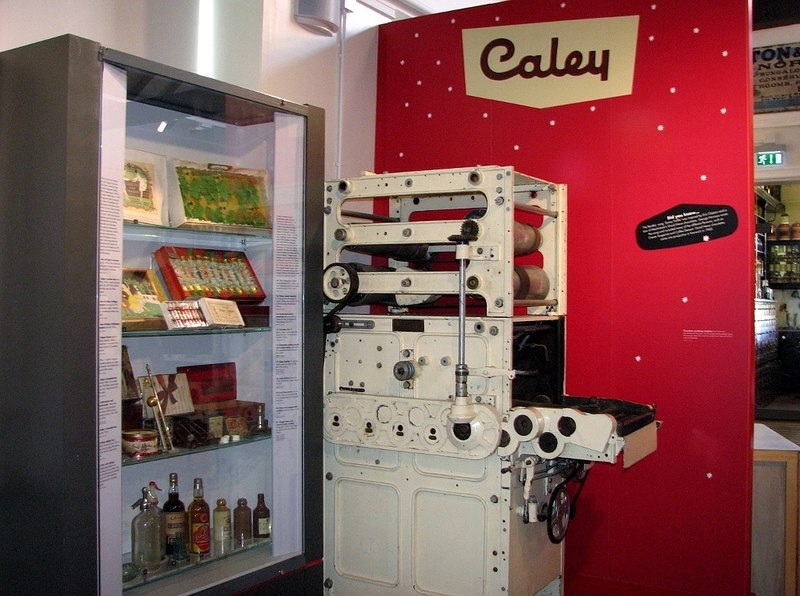
Caley's chocolate factory materials at the Museum of Norwich

Albert Jarman Caley had begun selling a range of mineral waters and soft drinks in Norwich in 1863. He diversified to produce cocoa (1883), chocolate (1886) and Christmas crackers (1898). The business was purchased in 1918 by the African and Eastern Trading Company and underwent expansion at Norwich and mineral water and cider factories in London, Ipswich, and Banham. Caley's had become overcapitalised and unprofitable, and the new owner sought unsuccessfully to dispose of the business in the 1920s.

In 1920, Lever Brothers acquired the Niger Company and in 1929, the United Africa Company was formed by a merger of the Niger Company and the African and Eastern Trading Company. In the same year, Unilever was formed when Lever Brothers merged with Dutch Margarine Unie.

As a result of a lunchtime meeting at the Savoy Hotel, Harold bought the A.J. Caley chocolate company in Norwich from Unilever in 1932, giving it access to chocolate production.

Whilst continuing in their roles at the parent company, Eric Mackintosh (Harold's younger brother, the managing director of Mackintosh's from 1929) became chairman of Caley's, with Harry Guy taking control of finance and Frank Bottomley as works manager.

== Later developments ==
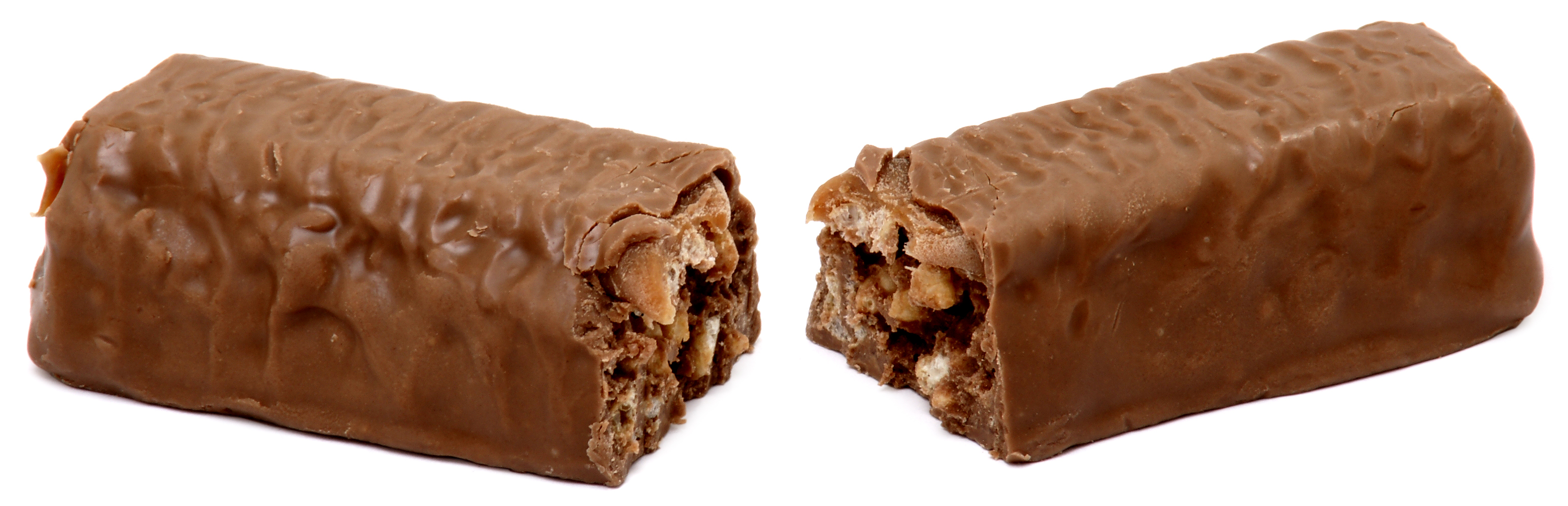
Toffee Crisp cut in half

Mackintosh's went on to develop brands such as Quality Street (1936), Rolo (1938), Caramac (1959) and Toffee Crisp (1963).

In 1969, the company merged with Rowntree's to form Rowntree Mackintosh Confectionery, which was itself taken over by Nestlé in 1988.

== In popular culture ==
The lyrics of George Harrison's song "Savoy Truffle", first recorded by the Beatles on their self-titled album is a listing of flavours, some real and others imagined, in a box of Mackintosh's Good News Chocolates.
