= Anne van Aaken =

German lawyer and economist (born 1969)

Anne Sophia-Marie van Aaken
- Born: 19 April 1969 (age 57)
- Education: University of Fribourg; LMU Munich
- Occupations: Lawyer, economist
- Spouse: Ulf Mark Schneider
- Children: 1

Anne Sophia-Marie van Aaken (born 19 April 1969 in Bonn, West Germany) is a German lawyer and economist, who is a full professor of law and economics, legal theory, public international law and European Union law at the University of Hamburg.

== Life ==
Van Aaken was born on 19 April 1969 in Bonn, Germany. She completed her Abitur in Bonn. Van Aaken is married to Mark Schneider, a former CEO of Nestlé. The couple have a daughter.

== Education ==
From 1987 to 1992, she studied economics and communication sciences at the University of Fribourg in Switzerland, earning a Lic. rer.pol. (equivalent to a Master’s in Economics) and a dipl. journ. in communication sciences. From 1992 to 1997, she studied law at LMU Munich, completing the First State Examination in Bavaria.

In 2001, she received her Dr. iur. (summa cum laude) from the European University Viadrina in Frankfurt/Oder. Her dissertation, “Rational Choice in der Rechtswissenschaft. Zum Stellenwert der Ökonomischen Theorie im Recht” (“Rational Choice Theory in Law: On the Significance of Economic Theory in Law”), explored the intersection of legal reasoning and economic theory.

In April 2012, she completed her habilitation (venia legendi) in Public International Law and Legal Theory at the University of Osnabrück. She was admitted to the German bar in 2003.

== Career ==
Her early teaching roles included assistant lecturer positions at the University of Fribourg from 1998 to 2000 in Economic and Social Policy and at Humboldt University of Berlin (2000–2003) in Private and Economic Law and Institutional Economics. She then worked as a Senior Research Fellow at the Max Planck Institute for Comparative Public Law and International Law in Heidelberg (2003–2005) and at the Max Planck Institute for Research of Collective Goods in Bonn (2005–2006).

From 2006 to 2012, she was a Tenure-Track Professor (Max Schmidheiny Foundation) at the University of St. Gallen, Switzerland, focusing on Law and Economics, Legal Theory, Public International Law, and European Law. From 2012 to 2018, she was a full professor at the University of St. Gallen in the same fields.

In 2018, Van Aaken was appointed to an Alexander von Humboldt Professorship at the University of Hamburg, becoming the first female legal scholar in Germany to receive this distinction. At Hamburg, she held the Chair for Law and Economics, Legal Theory, Public International Law, and European Law, and was Director of the Institute of Law and Economics. Since 2023, she continues in these fields as Chair and Co-Director of the Institute of Law and Economics at the University of Hamburg.

She was Vice President of the European Society of International Law (ESIL) from 2014 to 2017 and as a member of its Board from 2012 to 2020. She was Vice President of the European Association of Law and Economics (EALE) from 2008 to 2013 and a Board Member from 2007 to 2013.

She has been a member of several editorial boards, including the American Journal of International Law, European Journal of International Law, International Theory, and the Journal of International Economic Law. She is also General Editor of the Journal of International Dispute Settlement.

Beyond academia, van Aaken has been a consultant to international organizations such as the World Bank, OECD, UNCTAD, GIZ, and the United Nations High Level Advisory Board on Effective Multilateralism. She played a key role in the development of “The Hague Rules on Business and Human Rights Arbitration,” launched in 2019 at the Peace Palace in The Hague.

She is also a principal investigator at the Minerva Center for the Rule of Law under Extreme Conditions at the University of Haifa.

== Research ==
Van Aaken’s research lies at the intersection of law, economics, and behavioral science. Her work examines how economic and psychological insights can inform the design of international and domestic legal frameworks.

Her main research themes include international economic law, investment protection, regime interaction in international law, corporate social responsibility, corruption, and financial regulation.

Van Aaken has also contributed to legal theory through her work on deliberative institutional economics, analyzing how discourse and rationality influence legal institutions. She is known for integrating empirical and experimental methods into legal scholarship, promoting interdisciplinary methodologies that connect law, economics, and social science.

== Awards ==
- Alexander von Humboldt Professorship (2018)
- Fellow, Wissenschaftskolleg zu Berlin (2010–2011): Institute for Advanced Study in Berlin.
- Distinguished Fellow, Hebrew University, Jerusalem (2025).
- Finalist, Falling Walls/Berlin Science Week (2020) in the category of Social Sciences and Humanities.

== Publications ==
- van Aaken, Anne (2013). "Behavioral International Law and Economics". SSRN Electronic Journal. doi:10.2139/ssrn.2342576. ISSN 1556-5068.
- van Aaken, A. (18 May 2009). "International Investment Law Between Commitment and Flexibility: A Contract Theory Analysis". Journal of International Economic Law. 12 (2): 507–538. doi:10.1093/jiel/jgp022. ISSN 1369-3034.
- van Aaken (2009). "Defragmentation of Public International Law Through Interpretation: A Methodological Proposal". Indiana Journal of Global Legal Studies. 16 (2): 483. doi:10.2979/gls.2009.16.2.483. ISSN 1080-0727.
- van Aaken, Anne; Broude, Tomer (8 October 2020), "Arbitration from a Law & Economics Perspective", The Oxford Handbook of International Arbitration, Oxford University Press, pp. 874–894, ISBN 0-19-879619-6
- van Aaken, A.; Feld, L. P.; Voigt, S. (1 March 2010). "Do Independent Prosecutors Deter Political Corruption? An Empirical Evaluation across Seventy-eight Countries". American Law and Economics Review. 12 (1): 204–244. doi:10.1093/aler/ahq002. ISSN 1465-7252.
- Franck, Susan D.; van Aaken, Anne; Freda, James; Guthrie, Chris; Rachlinski, Jeffrey J. (10 January 2018). "Inside the Arbitrator's Mind". doi.org.
- van Aaken, Anne; Simsek, Betül (1 February 2021). "Rewarding in International Law". American Journal of International Law. 115 (2): 195–241. doi:10.1017/ajil.2021.2. ISSN 0002-9300.
- van Aaken, Anne (1 February 2006). "To Do Away with International Law? Some Limits to 'The Limits of International Law'". European Journal of International Law. 17 (1): 289–308. doi:10.1093/ejil/chi166. ISSN 1464-3596.
- van Aaken, Anne; Schmid-Lübbert, Stefanie, eds. (2003). "Beiträge zur ökonomischen Theorie im Öffentlichen Recht". doi:10.1007/978-3-322-81480-7.
- van Aaken, Anne (March 2008). "Perils of Success? The Case of International Investment Protection". European Business Organization Law Review. 9 (1): 1–27. doi:10.1017/s1566752908000013. ISSN 1566-7529.
