= Brooklyn Library, Multnomah County =

Oregon public library

Brooklyn Library
- Location: United States
- Type: Library
- Established: 1912
- Dissolved: 1971
- Parent organization: Multnomah County Library system

The Multnomah County Library system included a branch in the Brooklyn neighborhood of Portland from 1912 until 1971. The first Brooklyn branch library opened at the corner of Milwaukie and Powell on March 20, 1912. Between 1913 and 1917 the library moved to a fireproof building across the street. In 1930 the Portland fire department needed this block, and the library moved to 3216 SE 21st, just north of Powell Boulevard, where it remained until the library lost the lease for that building in 1971.
