= Controversies of Nestlé =

Nestlé controversial business practices

Nestlé, the biggest food company in the world, has been involved in a significant number of controversies and has been criticized a number of times for its business practices. Since the 1970s, Nestlé has faced criticism for:

- adding sugar to baby formula in poverty struck countries
- forced labour
- modern slavery
- child labour
- incidents of contaminated and infested food products
- deliberately false and misleading claims in marketing of breast milk substitutes, particularly in developing countries
- preventing access to non-bottled water in impoverished countries
- issues around animal welfare commitments
- actively spreading disinformation about recycling
- illegal water-pumping from drought-stricken Native American reservations
- price fixing
- union-busting activity
- deforestation
- lobbying to support misinformation about infant and women's nutrition. In 2014, Nestlé alone spent an estimated $160,000 on lobbying related to the Special Supplemental Nutrition Program for Women, Infants, and Children.

== Baby formula marketing (1970s–present) ==
Concern about Nestlé's aggressive marketing of their breast milk substitutes, particularly in developing countries, first arose in the 1970s. Critics have accused Nestlé of discouraging mothers from breastfeeding and suggesting that their baby formula is healthier than breastfeeding through marketing campaigns which suggested the formula was used by health professionals. This included Nestlé distributing free formula samples in maternity units and dressing salespeople as nurses to sell customers the false claim that the formula would help with infant health outcomes. This led to a boycott which was launched in 1977 in the United States and subsequently spread into Europe. The boycott was suspended in the US in 1984, after Nestlé agreed to follow an international marketing code endorsed by the World Health Organization (WHO), but was relaunched in 1989. As of 2011, the company is included in the FTSE4Good Index designed to help enable ethical investment.

However, the company allegedly repeated these same marketing practices in developing countries like Pakistan in the 1990s. A Pakistani salesman named Syed Aamir Raza Hussain became a whistle-blower against his former employer Nestlé. In 1999, two years after he left Nestlé, Hussain released a report in association with the non-profit organization Baby Milk Action, in which he alleged that Nestlé was encouraging doctors to push its infant formula products over breastfeeding. Nestlé has denied Raza's allegations. This story inspired the acclaimed 2014 Indian film Tigers by the Oscar-winning Bosnian director Danis Tanović.

In May 2011, nineteen Laos-based international NGOs, including Save the Children, Oxfam, CARE International, Plan International, and World Vision launched a boycott of Nestlé with an open letter. Among other unethical practices, they criticized a failure to translate labeling and health information into local languages and accused the company of giving incentives to doctors and nurses to promote the use of infant formula. Nestlé denied the claims and responded by commissioning an audit, carried out by Bureau Veritas, which concluded that "the requirements of the WHO Code and Lao PDR Decree are well embedded throughout the business" but that they were violated by promotional materials "in 4% of the retail outlets visited".

Ernest W. Lefever and the Ethics and Public Policy Center were criticized for accepting a $25,000 contribution from Nestlé while the organization was in the process of developing a report investigating medical care in developing nations which was never published. It was alleged that this contribution affected the release of the report and led to the author of the report submitting an article to Fortune magazine praising the company's position.

Nestlé has been under investigation in China since 2011 over allegations that the company bribed hospital staff to obtain the medical records of patients and push its infant formula to increase sales. This was found to be in violation of a 1995 Chinese regulation that aims to secure the impartiality of medical staff by banning hospitals and academic institutions from promoting instant formula to families. As a consequence, six Nestlé employees were given prison sentences between one and six years.

== Forced labor, modern slavery and child labor ==
=== Slavery and child labor in the cocoa industry ===
Multiple reports have documented the widespread use of child labor in cocoa production, as well as slavery and child trafficking, throughout West African plantations, on which Nestlé and other major chocolate companies rely. According to the 2010 documentary, The Dark Side of Chocolate, the children working are typically 12 to 15 years old. The Fair Labor Association has criticized Nestlé for not carrying out proper checks.

In 2005, after the cocoa industry had not met the Harkin–Engel Protocol deadline for certifying that the worst forms of child labor (according to the International Labor Organization's Convention 182) had been eliminated from cocoa production, the International Labor Rights Fund filed a lawsuit in 2005 under the Alien Tort Claims Act against Nestlé and others on behalf of three Malian children. The suit alleged that children were trafficked to Ivory Coast, forced into slavery, and experienced frequent beatings on a cocoa plantation. In September 2010, the U.S. District Court for the Central District of California determined corporations cannot be held liable for violations of international law and dismissed the suit. The case was appealed to the U.S. Court of Appeals. The Ninth Circuit Court of Appeals reversed the decision. In 2016, the U.S. Supreme Court declined to hear Nestlé's appeal of the Ninth Circuit's decision.

A 2016 study published in Fortune magazine concluded that approximately 2.1 million children in several West African countries "still do the dangerous and physically taxing work of harvesting cocoa", noting that "the average farmer in Ghana in the 2013–14 growing season made just 84¢ per day, and farmers in Ivory Coast a mere 50¢ [...] well below the World Bank's new $1.90 per day standard for extreme poverty". On efforts to reduce the issue, former secretary general of the Alliance of Cocoa Producing Countries, Sona Ebai, commented "Best-case scenario, we're only doing 10% of what's needed."

In 2019, Nestlé announced that they could not guarantee that their chocolate products were free from child slave labour, as they could trace only 49% of their purchasing back to the farm level. The Washington Post noted that the commitment taken in 2001 to eradicate such practices within four years had not been kept, neither at the due deadline of 2005, nor within the revised deadlines of 2008 and 2010, and that the result was not likely to be achieved for 2020 either.

In 2021, Nestlé was named in a class action lawsuit filed by eight former child slaves from Mali who alleged that the company aided and abetted their enslavement on cocoa plantations in Ivory Coast. The suit accused Nestlé (along with Barry Callebaut, Cargill, Mars Incorporated, Olam International, The Hershey Company, and Mondelez International) of knowingly engaging in forced labor, and the plaintiffs sought damages for unjust enrichment, negligent supervision, and intentional infliction of emotional distress. The lawsuit was dismissed in June 2021 by the Supreme Court of the United States on the grounds that all of the conduct alleged in the lawsuit had "occurred in the Ivory Coast," and American laws, specifically the Alien Tort Statute, could not be applied in an extraterritorial way.

=== Forced labor in Thai fishing industry ===
At the conclusion of a year-long self-imposed investigation in November 2015, Nestlé disclosed that seafood products sourced in Thailand were produced with forced labor. Nestlé is not a major purchaser of seafood in Southeast Asia, but does some business in Thailand – primarily for its Purina cat food. The study found virtually all US and European companies buying seafood from Thailand are exposed to the same risks of abuse in their supply chains. This type of disclosure was a surprise to many in the industry because international companies rarely acknowledge abuses in supply chains.

Nestlé was expected to launch a year-long program in 2016 focused on protecting workers across its supply chain. The company has promised to impose new requirements on all potential suppliers, train boat owners and captains about human rights, and hire auditors to check for compliance with new rules.

=== Anti-union activities in Colombia ===
Nestlé has been involved in extensive union-busting activity in Colombia since it first arrived there. According to a spokesman for Sinaltrainal, the Colombian Foodworkers Union: "Nestlé converts the factories into camps for the public security forces in order to create terror in the community, destroy the unity of the workers, and misinform the members of the union, with the goal of pitting them against the leaders and destroying the movement."

== Food safety ==
=== Milk products and baby food ===
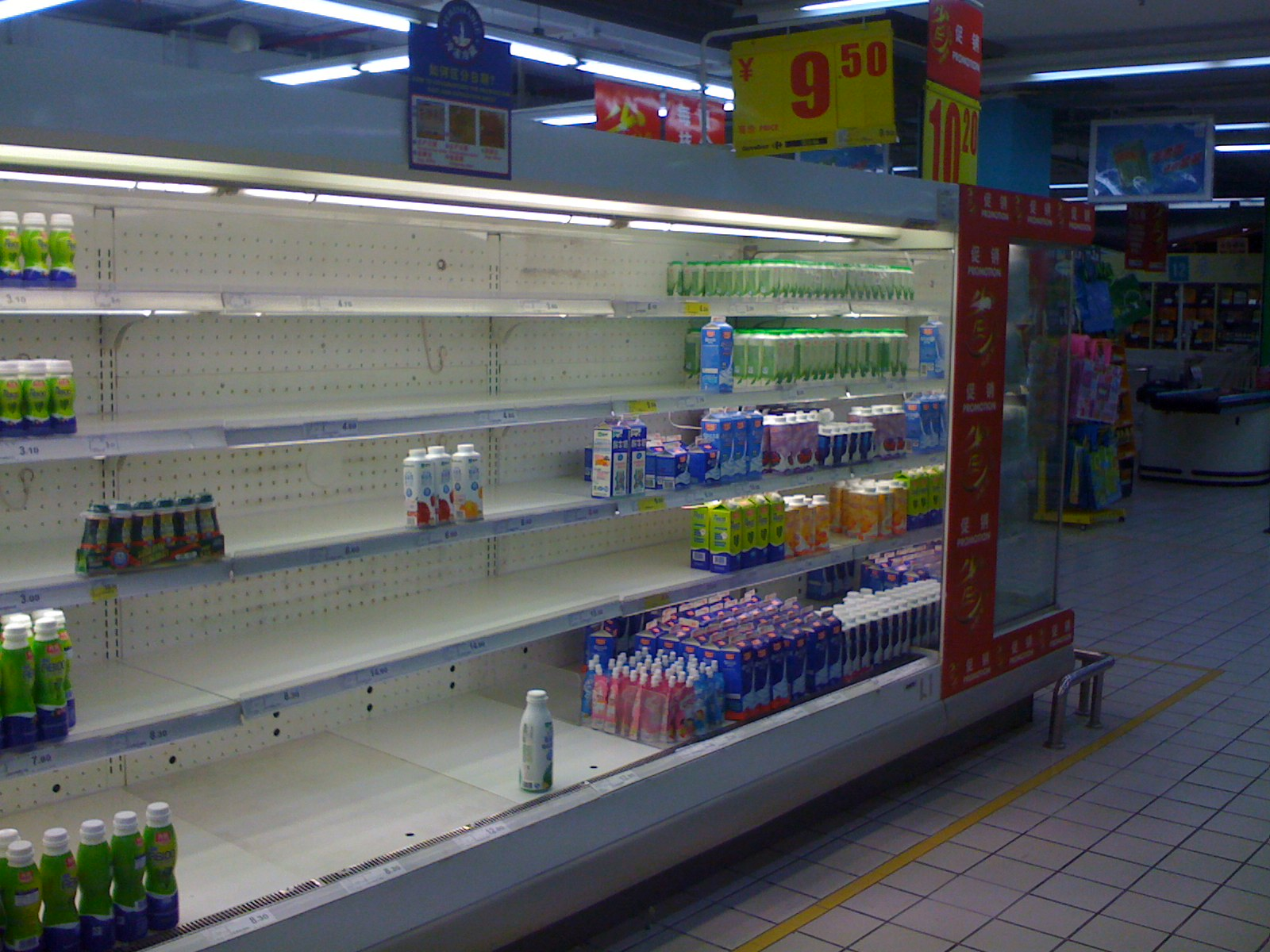
Empty milk shelf in a Carrefour supermarket in China as a result of the scandal.

In late September 2008, the Hong Kong government found melamine in a Chinese-made Nestlé milk product. Six infants died from kidney damage, and a further 860 babies were hospitalized. The Dairy Farm milk was made by Nestlé's division in the Chinese coastal city Qingdao. Nestlé affirmed that all its products were safe and were not made from milk adulterated with melamine. On 2 October 2008, the Taiwan Health ministry announced that six types of milk powders produced in China by Nestlé contained low-level traces of melamine, and were "removed from the shelves".

As of 2013, Nestlé has implemented initiatives to prevent contamination and utilizes what it calls a "factory and farmers" model that eliminates the middleman. Farmers bring milk directly to a network of Nestlé-owned collection centers, where a computerized system samples, tests, and tags each batch of milk. To reduce further the risk of contamination at the source, the company provides farmers with continuous training and assistance in cow selection, feed quality, storage, and other areas. In 2014, the company opened the Nestlé Food Safety Institute (NFSI) in Beijing that will help meet China's growing demand for healthy and safe food, one of the top three concerns among Chinese consumers. The NFSI announced it would work closely with authorities to help provide a scientific foundation for food-safety policies and standards, with support to include early management of food-safety issues and collaboration with local universities, research institutes and government agencies on food-safety.

In an incident in 2015, weevils and fungus were found in Cerelac cereal, recommended for kids.

In April 2024, an investigation by Public Eye, a Swiss NGO, and the International Baby Food Action Network (IBFAN) revealed that Nestlé's popular baby cereals and formulas sold in lower- and middle-income countries contained significantly higher amounts of added sugar compared to those sold in Europe and other developed nations.

In January 2026, six babies became ill after consuming Nestlé baby food linked to a safety alert over possible cereulide contamination, which can cause vomiting and diarrhea. Nestlé has also received additional illness reports, though a direct link has not been confirmed. French authorities are investigating whether two infant deaths are connected. The company recalled affected products in early January and has since launched a global recall covering more than 60 countries. The recall covered over 800 products from more than 10 Nestlé factories, making it the largest recall in the company’s history. The contamination was reported to link to the Omega-6 (ARA) oil supplied by Cabio Biotech, a Chinese company based in Wuhan.

=== Cookie dough ===
In June 2009, an outbreak of E. coli O157:H7 was linked to Nestlé's refrigerated cookie dough originating in a plant in Danville, Virginia. In the US, it caused sickness in more than 50 people in 30 states, half of whom required hospitalization. Following the outbreak, Nestlé recalled 30,000 cases of the cookie dough. The cause was determined to be contaminated flour obtained from a raw material supplier. When operations resumed, the flour used was heat-treated to kill bacteria.

=== Maggi noodles ===
In May 2015, food safety regulators from the state of Uttar Pradesh, India, found that samples of Nestlé India's Maggi noodles had up to 17 times more than the permissible safe amount of lead. Due to this, on 3 June 2015, the New Delhi Government banned the sale of Maggi in New Delhi stores for 15 days. Some of India's biggest retailers, such as Future Group, Big Bazaar, Easyday, and Nilgiris, had imposed a nationwide ban on Maggi as of 3 June 2015. On 4 June 2015, the Gujarat FD banned the sale of the noodles for 30 days after 27 out of 39 samples were detected with objectionable levels of metallic lead, among other things. On 5 June 2015, Food Safety and Standards Authority of India (FSSAI) orders banned all nine approved variants of Maggi instant noodles from India, deeming them "unsafe and hazardous" for human consumption, and Nepal indefinitely banned Maggi over concerns about lead levels in the product. Maggi noodles have been withdrawn in five African nations – Kenya, Uganda, Tanzania, Rwanda, and South Sudan – by a supermarket chain after a complaint by the Consumer Federation of Kenya, as a reaction to the ban in India.

In India, Maggi products were returned to the shelves in November 2015, accompanied by a Nestlé advertising campaign to win back consumer trust. Nestlé resumed production of Maggi at all five plants in India on 30 November 2015.

In the Philippines, localized versions of Maggi instant noodles were sold until 2011 when the product group was recalled for suspected salmonella contamination. The product did not return to market, while Nestle continues to sell seasoning products including the popular Maggi Magic Sarap.

=== Buitoni pizza ===
In 2022, a French pizza factory owned by Buitoni (a subsidiary of Nestlé) was discovered to have been the source of an outbreak of E. coli, which resulted in the death of at least 2 people, with 55 cases being confirmed to be related to the factory. It was found to have inconceivable sanitary conditions, with photos showing ingredients spilled on the floor and conveyor belts with residue on them.

== Water ==
=== Status of potable water ===
At the second World Water Forum in 2000, Nestlé and other corporations persuaded the World Water Council to change its statement so as to reduce access to drinking water from a "right" to a "need". Nestlé continues to take control of aquifers and bottle their water for profit. Peter Brabeck-Letmathe, chairman of Nestlé, later changed his statement, saying in a 2013 interview, "I am the first one to say water is a human right." In that same interview, he claimed that it was the "primary responsibility of every government" to provide 30 liters of water a day to citizens.

=== Pure Life bottled water in Pakistan ===
At the World Water Forum 2005, Nestlé was confronted with a study about its negative impact and use of corporate power in Pakistan. Human rights scholar Nils Rosemann presented the study "Drinking Water Crisis in Pakistan and the Issue of Bottled Water - The Case of Nestlé's Pure Life." After the report was published, Nestlè called it highly distorted and misleading picture of the situation, refusing any responsibility for the "water stress" in Pakistan. Nestlè stated "We always operate in accordance with applicable laws and regulations, whether local or international, as well as with internal Nestlé standards and policies, as the Nestlé Corporate Business Principles." It took more than 10 years until 2018 until the Supreme Court of Pakistan took the study from Nils Rosemann and addressed Nestlè directly for its false business conduct. In the same year, Pakistan's Audit Agency stated that the enterprise made an "unjustified" profit with its bottled water.

=== Environmental impact of bottles of bottled water ===
A coalition of environmental groups filed a complaint against Nestlé to the Advertising Standards of Canada after Nestlé took out full-page advertisements in October 2008 with messages claiming, "Most water bottles avoid landfill sites and are recycled", "Nestlé Pure Life is a healthy, eco-friendly choice", and, "Bottled water is the most environmentally responsible consumer product in the world." A spokesperson from one of the environmental groups stated: "For Nestlé to claim that its bottled water product is environmentally superior to any other consumer product in the world is not supportable." In their 2008 Corporate Citizenship Report, Nestlé themselves stated that many of their bottles end up in the solid-waste stream, and that most of their bottles are not recycled. The advertising campaign has been called greenwashing. Nestlé defended its ads, saying that they will show they have been truthful in their campaign.

=== Water bottling operations in California, Oregon and Michigan ===
Considerable controversy has surrounded Nestlé's bottled water brand, Arrowhead, sourced from wells alongside a spring in Millard Canyon situated in a Native American Reservation at the base of the San Bernardino Mountains in California. While corporate officials and representatives of the governing Morongo tribe have asserted that the company, which started its operations in 2000, is providing meaningful jobs in the area and that the spring is sustaining current surface water flows, a number of local citizen groups and environmental action committees have started to question the amount of water drawn in the light of the ongoing drought, and the restrictions that have been placed on residential water use. Additionally, recent evidence suggests that representatives of the Forest Service failed to follow through on a review process for Nestlé's permit to draw water from the San Bernardino wells, which expired in 1988. In San Bernardino, Nestlé pays the US Forest Service $524 yearly to pump and bottle about 30 million gallons, even during droughts. Peter Gleick, a co-founder of the Pacific Institute, which researches freshwater issues, remarked "Every gallon of water that is taken out of a natural system for bottled water is a gallon of water that doesn't flow down a stream, that doesn't support a natural ecosystem." He also said, "Our public agencies have dropped the ball".

The former forest supervisor Gene Zimmerman has explained that the review process was rigorous, and that the Forest Service "didn't have the money or the budget or the staff" to follow through on the review of Nestlé's long-expired permit. However, Zimmerman's observations and action have come under scrutiny for a number of reasons. Firstly, along with the natural resource manager for Nestlé, Larry Lawrence, Zimmerman is a board member for and played a vital role in the founding of the nonprofit Southern California Mountains Foundation, of which Nestlé is the most noteworthy and longtime donor. Secondly, the Zimmerman Community Partnership Award – an award inspired by Zimmerman's actions and efforts "to create a public/private partnership for resource development and community engagement" – was presented by the foundation to Nestlé's Arrowhead Water division in 2013. Finally, while Zimmerman retired from his former role in 2005, he currently works as a paid consultant for Nestlé, leading many investigative journalists to question Zimmerman's allegiances prior to his retirement from the Forest Service.

In April 2015, the city of Cascade Locks, Oregon, and the Oregon Department of Fish and Wildlife, which is using water for a salmon hatchery, applied with the Oregon Water Resources Department to permanently trade their water rights to Nestlé; an action which does not require a public-interest review. Nestlé approached them in 2008 and they had been considering to trade their well water with Oregon's Oxbow Springs water, a publicly owned water source in the Columbia River Gorge National Scenic Area, and to sell the spring water at over 100 million gallons of water per year to Nestlé. The plan has been criticized by legislators and 80,000 citizens. The 250,000-square-foot, $50 million Nestlé bottling plant in Cascade Locks with an unemployment rate of 18.8 percent would have 50 employees and would increase property-tax collections by 67 percent. In May 2016, voters of Hood River County voted 69 percent to 31 percent for the ballot measure to ban large bottling operations in the area, but in Cascade Locks, the one precinct in Hood River County, voters decided against the ballot measure, 58 percent to 42 percent. As a result, the Cascade Locks city council voted 5-to-1 to keep up the fight. Soon after, Governor Kate Brown directed state officials to stop an exchange of water rights that was crucial to the deal, citing fiscal rather than environmental reasons. Nestlé then acknowledged that the exchange "will not be going forward", marking a definite end to the planned bottling operation.

Although a 2005 court settlement gave Nestlé the right to pump 250 gallons per minute (GPM) from a well in unincorporated Osceola Township, Osceola County, Michigan, Nestlé has tried to increase that rate to 400 GPM. Its bottled water is sold under the Ice Mountain Spring label. The local planning commission denied the application to build a booster station to increase the capacity of the pipeline that delivers water to a water truck depot some distance from the town. Local citizens mounted considerable grassroots opposition to the plan, with 55 opponents testifying against the proposal at a meeting attended by almost 500 people in July 2017. The litigation has been costly to the small town, which receives its only compensation from a $200 annual pumping fee. Regarding the 1976 Michigan Safe Drinking Water Act, section 17, a measure precipitated by Nestlé's previous demands, Bill Cobbs, a current Democratic gubernatorial candidate said, "This is wrong – when this act was written in 1976 it was never intentioned that water would be up for sale." The "David vs. Goliath" situation is drawing increasing national attention. Nestlé approaches water purely as a commodity. In 1994 Helmut Maucher, Nestlé's CEO commented, "Springs are like petroleum. You can always build a chocolate factory. But springs you have or you don't have." His successor, Peter Brabeck-Letmathe, was criticized when, in a 2005 documentary, he similarly promoted and rationalized the commodification of water, saying: "One perspective held by various NGOs—which I would call extreme—is that water should be declared a human right."

In April 2021, and after many water rights complaints and online petitions against Nestlé, California's Water Resources Control Board told the company that it has to stop unauthorized natural spring water diversions in the San Bernardino Forest.

== Animal welfare ==
In 2018, Nestlé pledged to abide by the "Better Chicken Commitment", which involved committing to a range of improved welfare practices for chicken procured for use in Nestlé food products. However, a 2025 review from Compassion in World Farming listed that the company was not providing updates on progress towards complying with its 2018 pledge.

In 2024, Nestle reported that 74.4% of its eggs are sourced from cage-free suppliers, slightly down from 76.3% in 2021.

== Economical ==
=== Chocolate price fixing ===
In Canada, the Competition Bureau raided the offices of Nestlé Canada (along with those of Hershey Canada and Mars Canada) in 2007 to investigate the matter of price fixing of chocolates. It is alleged that executives with Nestlé (the maker of KitKat, Coffee Crisp, and Big Turk) colluded with competitors in Canada to inflate prices.

The Bureau alleged that competitors' executives met in restaurants, coffee shops, and at conventions, and that Nestlé Canada CEO, Robert Leonidas, once handed a competitor an envelope containing his company's pricing information, saying: "I want you to hear it from the top – I take my pricing seriously."

Nestlé and the other companies were subject to class-action lawsuits for price fixing after the raids were made public in 2007. Nestlé settled for $9 million, without admitting liability, subject to court approval in the new year. A massive class-action lawsuit continues in the United States.

=== Milk price fixing ===
In February 2024, the Spanish Audiencia Nacional fined Nestlé with 6.86 million euros for forming a cartel with other dairy companies to avoid competition when buying milk from Spanish farmers between 2000 and 2013. The farmers can now further sue for damages.

=== Ethiopian debt repayment ===
In 2002, Nestlé demanded that the nation of Ethiopia repay US$6 million of debt to the company at a time when Ethiopia was suffering a severe famine. Nestlé backed down from its demand after more than 8,500 people complained via e-mail to the company about its treatment of the Ethiopian government. The company agreed to re-invest any money it received from Ethiopia back into the country. In 2003, Nestlé agreed to accept an offer of US$1.5 million, and donated the money to three active charities in Ethiopia: the Red Cross, Caritas, and UNHCR.

== Political ==
=== Russo-Ukrainian war ===
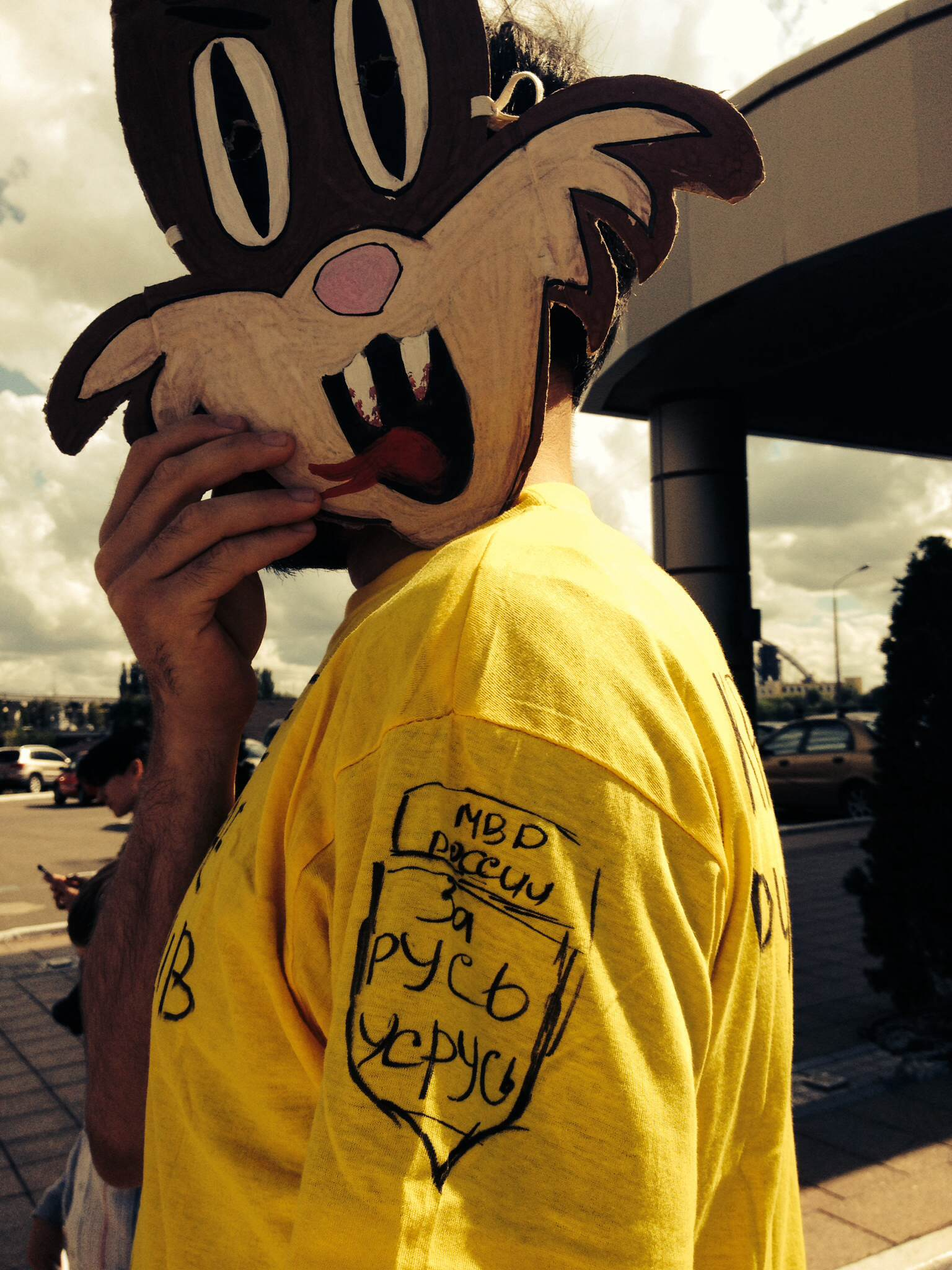
A "Nesquik-rashist" rabbit at the Anti-Russian demonstration, Kyiv

In August 2015, the Ukrainian TV channel Ukrayina refused to hire a worker of the weekly magazine Krayina, Alla Zheliznyak, as a host of a cooking show because she speaks Ukrainian. The demand to only hire a Russian-speaking host was allegedly set by a sponsor of the show – Nesquik, which is a brand of Nestlé S.A. Activists of the Vidsich civil movement held a rally near the office of the company in Kyiv, accusing Nestlé of discriminating against people who speak Ukrainian and supporting the Russification of Ukraine. They also criticised goods sold in Ukraine being manufactured in Russia and threatened a boycott.

Following the 2022 Russian invasion of Ukraine, many international, particularly Western companies pulled out of Russia. Unlike most of its Western competitors, Nestlé was slow to announce any disinvestments or scaling back of its operations in Russia, drawing criticism. Nestlé employs 7,000 workers in Russia and stated they intend to protect them. Ukrainian president Volodymyr Zelenskyy pleaded for a stop of business activities that help finance the Ukraine invasion. Nestlé suspended shipment of non-essential items but continued to produce essential food items in Russia. The company said that "our activities in Russia will focus on providing essential food, such as infant food and medical/hospital nutrition".

On November 2, 2023, the National Agency on Corruption Prevention (NACP) has included the company in the list of international sponsors of the war.

=== Relationship with Israel ===
In 2016, the Nestlé wholly acquired Israeli food manufacturer Osem for $840 million, owning 100% of the shares, and strengthening its business ties to Israel. They had already invested in Osem over 20 years prior, owning 63.7% of the company.

This drew significant criticism from Palestinian rights groups, and lead to boycott calls, including by the Boycott, Divestment and Sanctions (BDS) movement. In 2023, the Turkish parliament removes Nestlé products from its restaurants over alleged Israel support. In 2024, they reported that sales had suffered due to boycott campaigns, reporting a 2.5% YoY drop in sales.

== Deforestation ==
In September 2017, an investigation conducted by NGO Mighty Earth found that a large amount of the cocoa used in chocolate produced by Nestlé and other major chocolate companies was grown illegally in national parks and other protected areas in Ivory Coast and Ghana. The countries are the world's two largest cocoa producers.

The report documents how in several national parks and other protected areas, 90% or more of the land mass has been converted to cocoa. Less than four percent of Ivory Coast remains densely forested, and the chocolate companies' laissez-faire approach to sourcing has driven extensive deforestation in Ghana as well. In Ivory Coast, deforestation has pushed chimpanzees into just a few small pockets, and reduced the country's elephant population from several hundred thousand to about 200–400.
