= Philipp Navratil =

Austrian-Swiss business executive

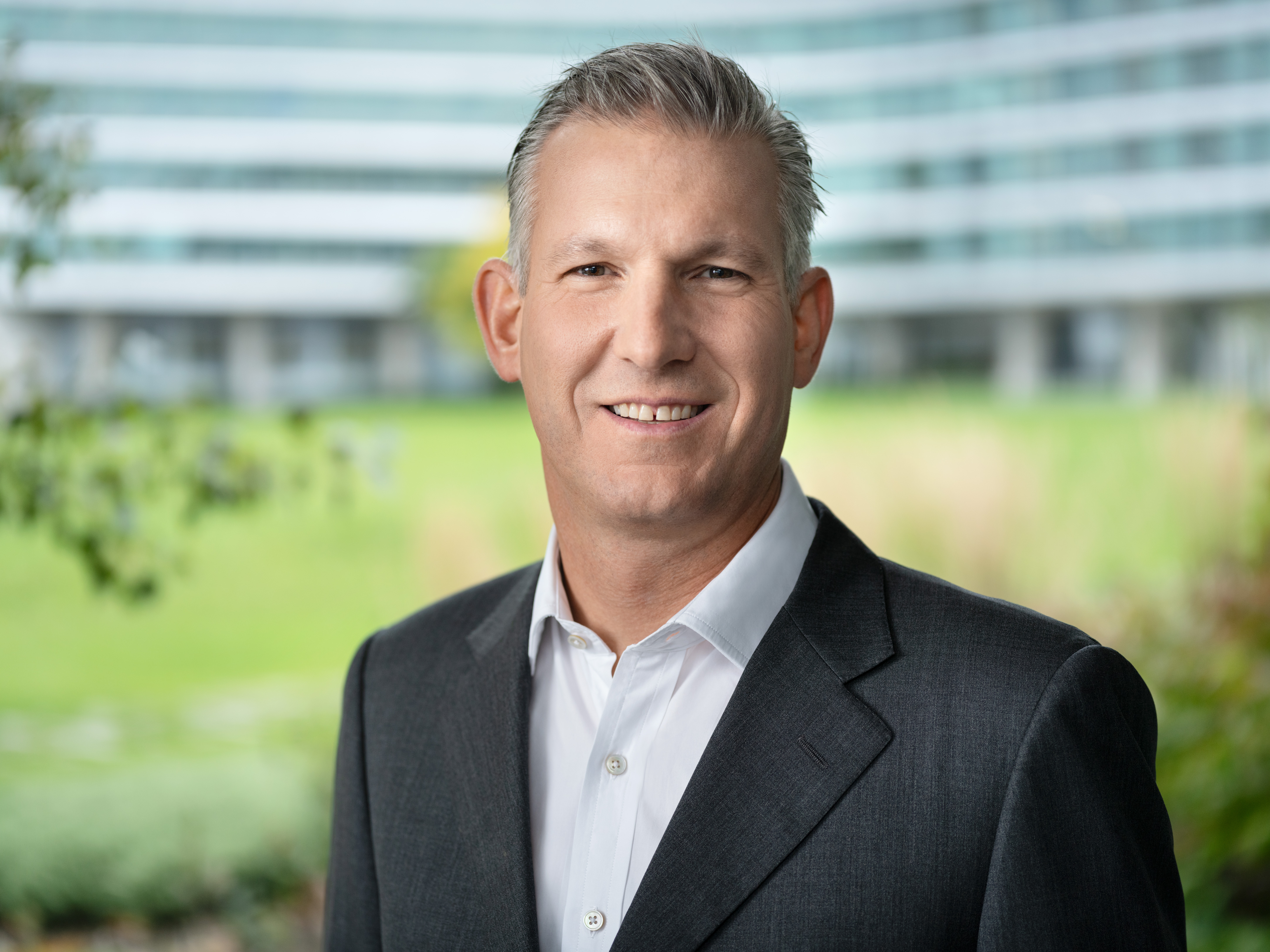
- Born: 1976 (age 49–50); Zürich
- Citizenship: Austria; Switzerland
- Education: University of St. Gallen
- Occupations: Chief executive, Nestlé
- Organization: Nestlé
- Predecessor: Laurent Freixe
- Children: 2

Philipp Navratil (born 1976) is an Austrian-Swiss business executive and has been the chief executive of Nestlé since September 2025.

== Early life and education ==
Navratil was born in 1976 in Zürich and has Swiss and Austrian nationality. Navratil earned an MBA from the University of St. Gallen, Switzerland.

== Career ==
On leaving university in 2001, Navratil joined Nestlé as an internal auditor and went on to hold various commercial roles in Central America for the company.

In 2009, Navratil was appointed as country manager for Nestlé in Honduras.

In 2013, Navratil was appointed to lead Nestlé's coffee and beverage business in Mexico until 2020 when he returned to Switzerland to head Nestlé’s coffee strategic business unit.

He became head of the Nespresso business in 2024 and, in January 2025, he was appointed to Nestlé's board.

In September 2025, Navratil was appointed chief executive of Nestlé following the immediate dismissal of his predecessor, Laurent Freixe. On appointment, the company's chair, Paul Bulcke, said "The board is confident that he will drive our growth plans forward and accelerate efficiency efforts.".

== Personal life ==
Navratil is married with two children.
