= Giebisch and Joplin =

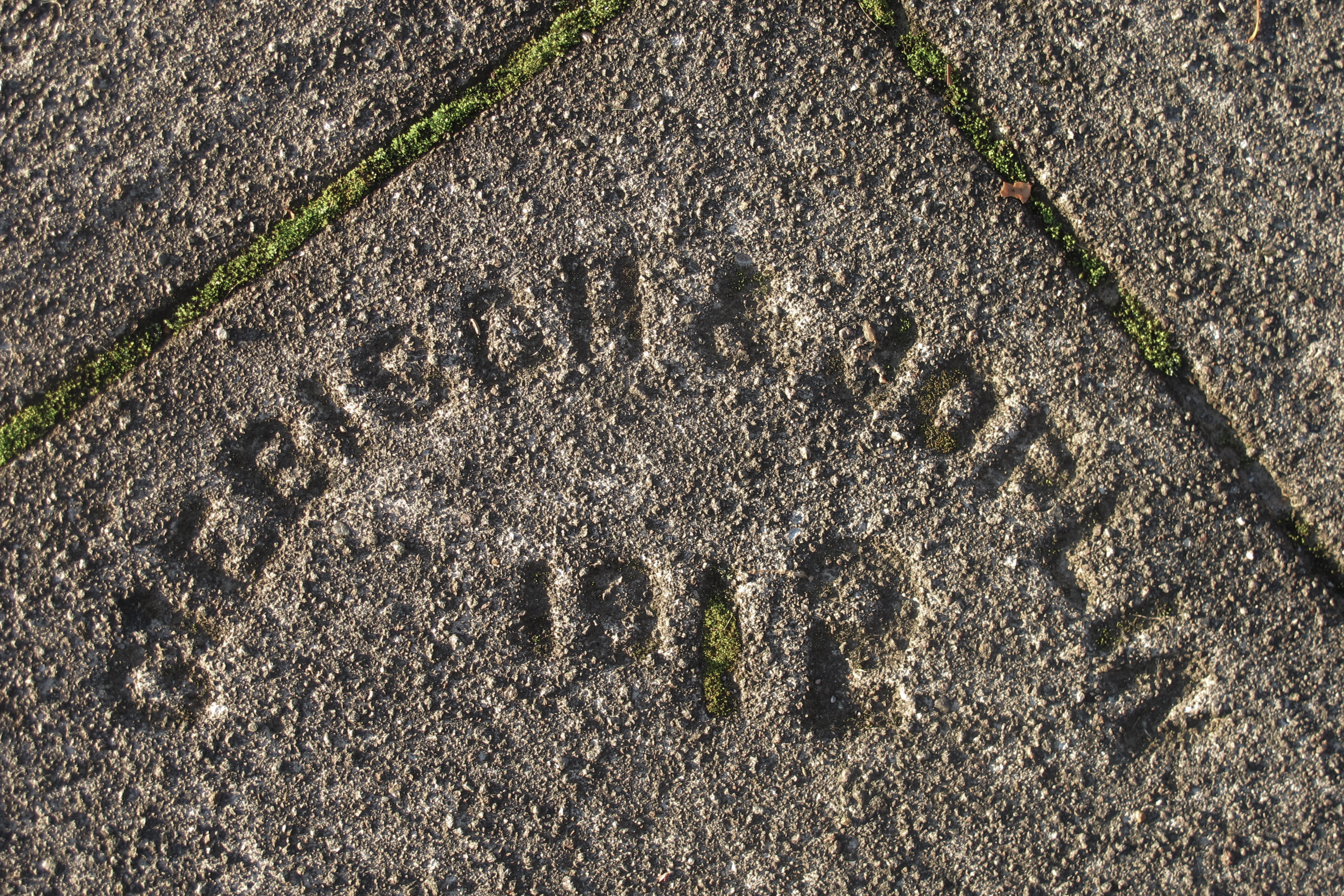
- A stamp on a sidewalk paved by Giebisch and Joplin, at the corner of 35th place and Stanton street in Northeast Portland
- Industry: General contractor; Paving; Condensed milk production
- Headquarters: Portland, Oregon, United States
- Key people: Ada Joplin; Anton Giebisch

A photograph of Anton Giebisch

Giebisch and Joplin was a contracting and paving company in Portland, Oregon in the 1900s and 1910s. The company was run by Ada Joplin and her husband Anton Giebisch, married on 8 June 1892. The company built the original Brooklyn neighborhood sewers in Portland, Oregon, as well as jetties in Coos Bay and Clatsop, Oregon although they primarily laid sidewalks and streets. Giebisch and Joplin also started a condensed milk plant in Bandon, Oregon.

== Fines ==
Multiple times, Giebisch and Joplin were fined for taking too long on a paving job, including once in 1914, when the city threatened to cancel their contracts for an unfinished job on Sandy Boulevard. In 1916, Giebisch and Joplin were contracted to repair 10th avenue, from Going street to Alberta street. After they left the street uncompleted for months, they were fined $20.

== Brooklyn Neighborhood Sewers ==
In 1909, Giebisch and Joplin was contracted to build the sewers of the Brooklyn neighborhood of Portland. Harry Lane, the mayor at the time, hired a man named Wright to investigate, paying him $5 a day. The city, represented by the lawyer Mr. Easterly, refused to pay Giebisch for his work, which they considered sub-standard. This outraged Giebisch, who called Easterly "a grafter, a hold-up man, and worse," saying that he "tried to hold me up for a piece of money, but I wouldn't give it! So now he's taking his grudge out no me." Giebisch threatened to fight Easterly, and he and his workers almost physically attacked Lane, who manage to calming down, saying that he "had demanded all the facts in connection with this piece of work, and they have not been forthcoming from the city engineer."

== Condensed milk plant ==
In the 1910s, Giebisch and Joplin began expanding into the condensed milk industry. In October 1912, they began processing milk in Mcminnville, at the Willamette Valley Condensed Milk plant, after the board of directors shut it down. They were based in Portland, Oregon, making condensed milk at 7.9% butterfat in 1916, just barely above the legal requirement of 7.8% butterfat. In the fall of 1917, their newly formed Giebisch and Joplin Condensed Milk Company acquired land in Bandon, Oregon to build a milk condensing plant. The plant consisted of a two story building, 106 feet by 240 feet; as well as a detached power station, with dimensions of 40 by 60 feet, jutting out into the Bay of Bandon, and cost $100,000 to build, and had a capacity of 1,000 cases a day. They acquired land in McMinnville Oregon at the same time for another condensed milk plant, and both plants were operational by April 1918.

The McMinnville plant soon owed $400,000 to creditors, including a $68,000 debt to milk farmers. They shut down operation of both plants in later 1918. In January 1919, Nestlé bought both plants for $250,000, and expanded them considerably, processing 250,000 pounds of condensed milk daily in the Bandon plant.

== Personal life ==
Anton Giebisch was born on 31 December 1867, in Austria.

On August 24, 1909, Anton Giebisch hit a woman named Ms. C. A. Welch on Morrison and Fourteenth street with his car, having encountered a wet spot on the road. She was uninjured.

They had one son, Gordon Giebisch. Joplin died in 1946, and Giebisch died in October 1953, at his house on SE 113th street in Portland, Oregon.
