= Johan Poulsen House =

Historic building in Portland, Oregon, U.S.

- U.S. National Register of Historic Places
- Portland Historic Landmark
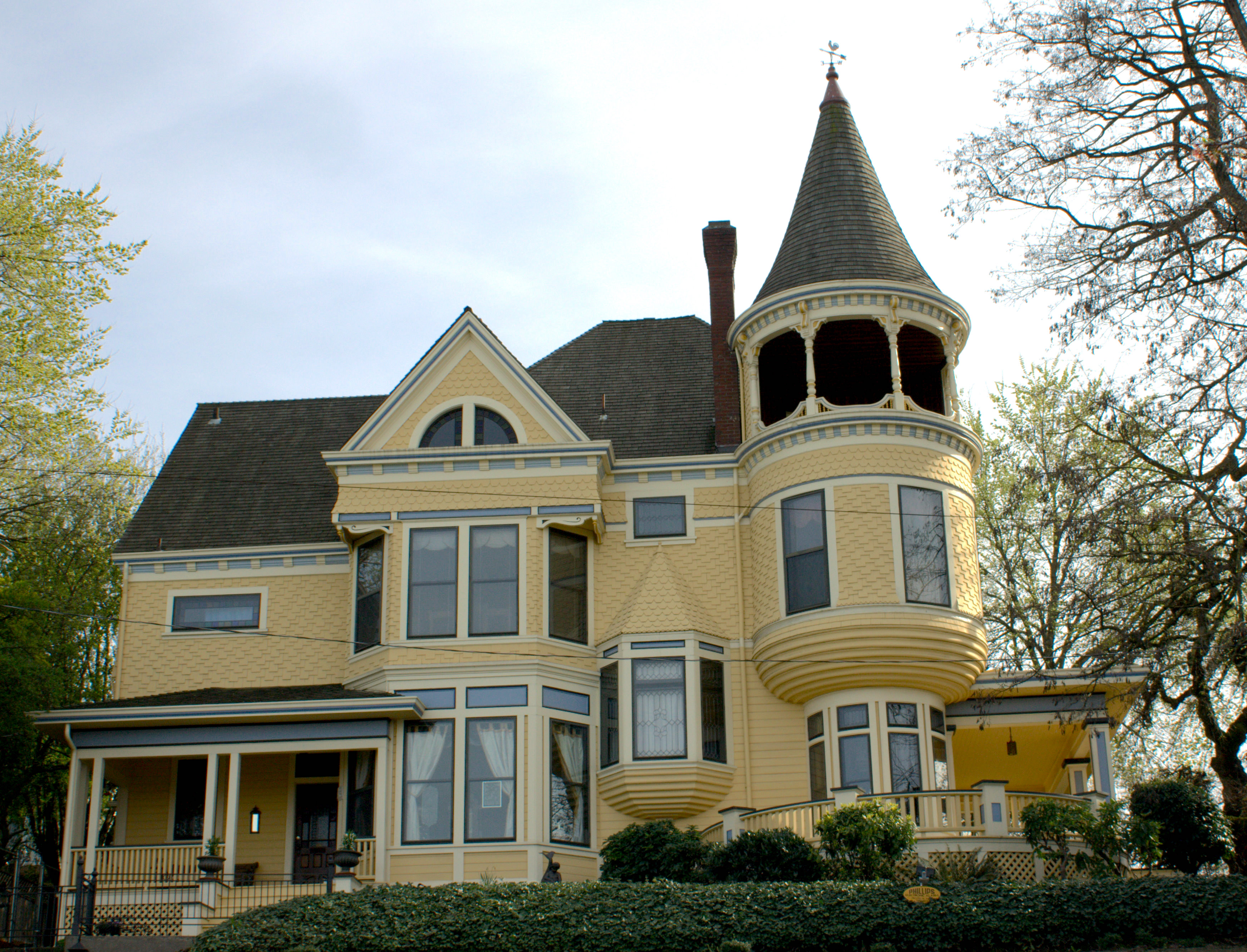
- The Poulsen House in 2010

- Location within Portland, Oregon
- Location: 3040 SE McLoughlin Boulevard; Portland, Oregon
- Coordinates: 45°30′03″N 122°39′36″W
- Area: 0.3 acres (0.12 ha)
- Built: 1890
- Architectural style: American Queen Anne Style
- NRHP reference No.: 77001113
- Added to NRHP: March 14, 1977

The Johan Poulsen House is a three-story American Queen Anne Style mansion in Portland, Oregon's Brooklyn neighborhood. It was built in 1892 by an unknown architect.

== House details ==
Poulsen bought the property in July 1890 for $3,000, and the house was completed in August 1892. Poulsen sold the house immediately to S. B. Willey, probably either due to financial issues caused by the lead-up to the Panic of 1893 or because his wife, Dora, did not like it. He sold it on a mortgage to Willey and sold it outright to Arthur Zwicker for $7,500 on July 14, 1894. Alternately, the home was sold to William J. Clemens, an Oregon senator, in 1902.

The house was built in 1892. The turret reaches approximately 50 feet. It includes a bedroom on the first floor for a servant. It contains two lead glass Oriel windows, a Palladian window, curved glass in the turret, and beveled lead glass windows. The home also contains a veranda, added around 1915. It is considered a "Pacific Northwest interpretation of the Queen Anne Style", since it does not contain stone or brick.

The interior features a large carved oak fireplace and mantel, carved stairway balustrades, and oak flooring with a mahogany border. Containing nine bedrooms and 12-foot ceilings, the maid's bedroom is on the first floor, with four bedrooms on each of the second and third floors. The third floor may have originally been a large ballroom.

The home was bought by "The Doughnut King", A. A. Hoover, in 1919, and became known as the "King's Castle" or "The King's Palace". The property was then sold to Henrietta B. Huthman in 1923, whose family owned it until 1946. The Huthman family added the two-car garage and large retaining wall in 1926. The two-car garage was connected to the house via tunnel. The home was converted to a boarding house sometime between 1946 and 1976. James F. Nevin purchased the house in approximately 1976 and began restoring it.

The house was surveyed by the Portland Historical Landmarks Commission on October 3, 1973, and was added to the National Register of Historic Places on March 14, 1977.

In 2017, the Poulsen House was purchased as a home for Prospect, a Portland communications, design, government relations, & digital media agency. Prospect sold the house in 2019 to an investor from Seattle who renovated the interior of the property and added a new roof. He sold it to its current owner, Charlene Quaresma in September 2020.

June of 2021, Quaresma recharacterized the property for commercial use to run her financial planning practice, House of Q Wealth Management. In 2026, a large renovation project was competed to restore the open turret on the west-end of the building due to decades of deferred maintenance. Though she was able to preserve 95% of the original wood in the turret, the weathervane could not be saved and was replaced with a custom cooper spire, topped with an ametrine crystal.

== Johan Poulsen ==
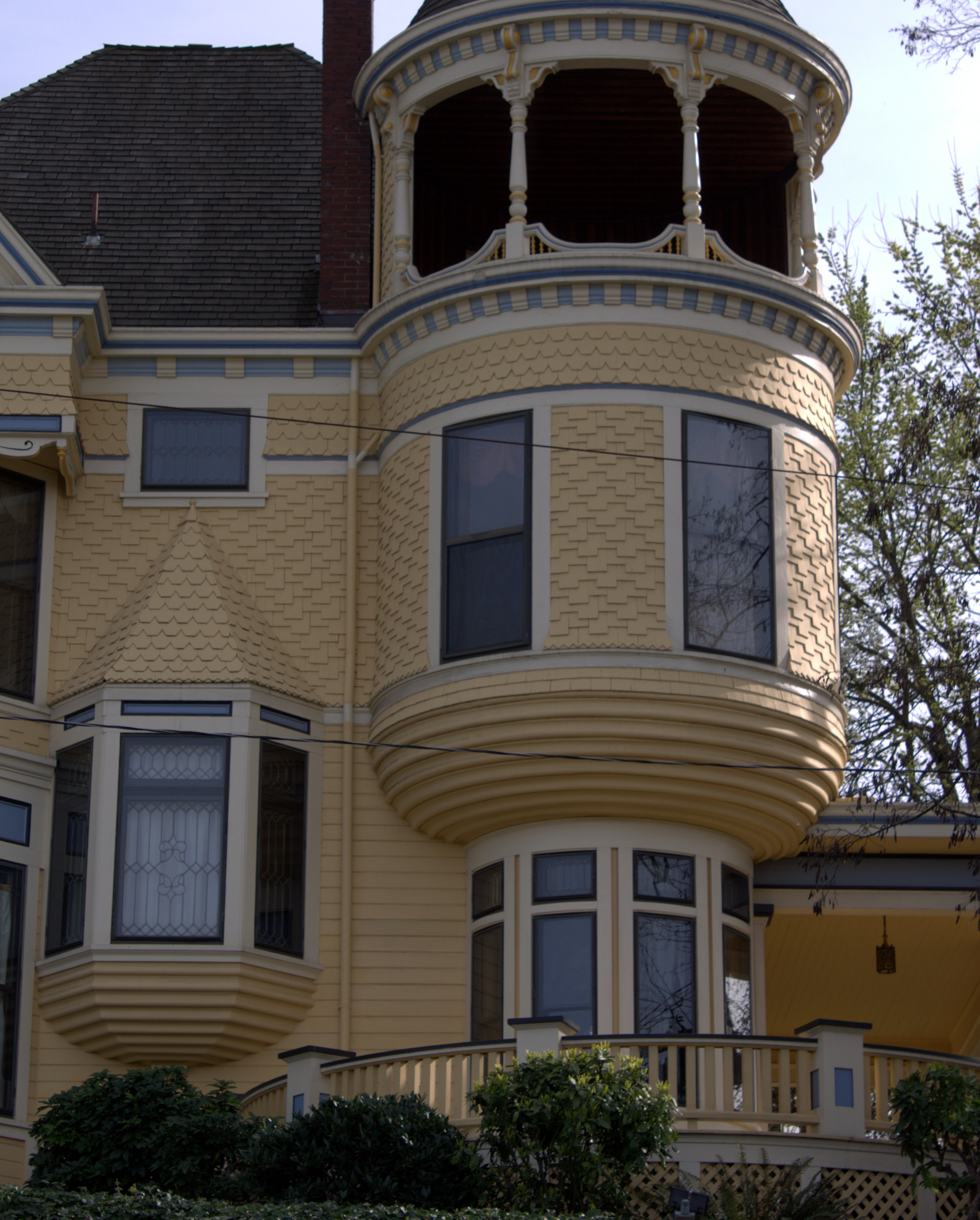
Turret details of house

Poulsen was born in 1849 as Johannes Poulsen in north Slesvig, Germany. The area of his birth is now Denmark. He came to Iowa in 1870, married his wife Dora in 1873, and came to Portland in 1875.

Before 1890 he also owned part of the North Pacific Lumber Company and Willamette Steam Sawmill Company. He sold his ownership of these companies to start the Inman-Poulsen Lumber Company (which would eventually be absorbed into Georgia-Pacific) with Robert D. Inman. Their company had a sawmill on the east side of the Willamette River at Clinton Street. The sawmill dock could accommodate two oceangoing ships at a time. Inman had an almost identical house at 6th and Woodward Street, which was demolished in 1958 to make room for a parking lot.

By 1903, the Inman-Poulsen company was the largest lumber company in Oregon with 350 employees, later peaking at 700 employees. The large lumber mill had a conveyor belt piling sawdust, which went to a Portland General Electric plant located next door.

Poulsen built another large house on Hassalo Street in the Lloyd District, replaced by a Red Lion hotel later.

== See also ==
- National Register of Historic Places listings in Southeast Portland, Oregon
