= Laurent Freixe =

French business executive

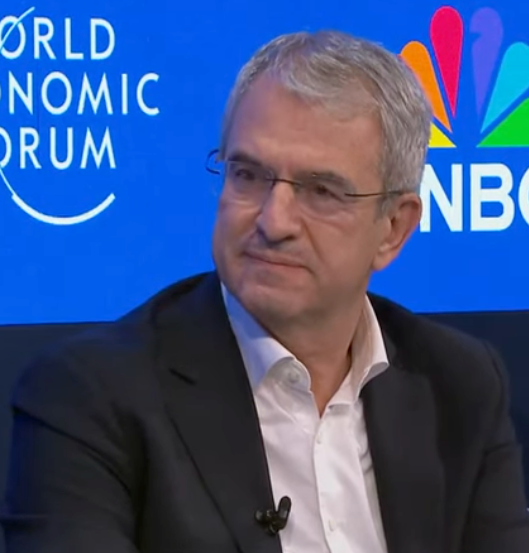
- Freixe in 2025
- Born: Laurent Henri Bruno Freixe; 21 April 1962 (age 64); Paris, France
- Education: EDHEC Business School
- Years active: 1986-2025 (CEO 2024–2025)
- Employer: Nestlé
- Predecessor: Ulf Mark Schneider
- Successor: Philipp Navratil
- Spouse: Agata Balcerowska

Laurent Freixe (born 21 April 1962) is a French business executive. After nearly more than four decades at Nestlé, he became its chief executive in 2024, until losing the position about a year later, in September 2025.

== Early life ==
Born Laurent Henri Bruno Freixe on 21 April 1962 in Paris, France, Freixe grew up in Paris, a child of parents that were electrical engineers. As a youth, Freixe was a competitive handball player, winning a French championship when he was sixteen years old.

After university, Freixe earned a Master in Management in 1985 from the EDHEC Business School, graduating from its Grande Ecole programme, at its Lille campus, where his emphasis was marketing.

== Career ==
Freixe began at Nestlé in 1986; his early responsibilities included negotiating contracts with grocery stores. He worked in market research, then as a brand manager for the Dairy and Nutrition division. He helped Nestlé beat competitor Captain Iglo in the fish sticks market with a new fish sticks brand he launched called Croustibat. He also helped the struggling French snacks division rebound by making large cuts to the overstaffed division.

At age 37, Freixe became the head of the Dairy and Nutrition Division for Nestlé France for three years, before moving to Hungary where he was the head of the Spanish and Portuguese markets for two years. In 2008, Freixe was invited to take over as the head of Europe. Freixe helped grow the Nestlé coffee brand Nescafé Dolce Gusto to billions in annual revenue. As head of Europe, he developed his approach to management, which he refers to as a "virtuous circle." In 2014, he was put in charge of the Americas at Nestlé.

In May 2018, Freixe was appointed International Youth Ambassador by the Ibero-American Youth Organization, and in October 2023 he received the Order of Merit from the Peruvian Vice Minister.

On 1 September 2024, Freixe succeeded Ulf Mark Schneider as chief executive of Nestlé. He reversed the planned restructure, increased spending on advertising, and cut costs by a few hundred million euro per year. Freixe refocused the company on core brands including Nescafé, KitKat and Fancy Feast, and promised to reinvest in areas with more-promising growth products, such as cold coffee. Freixe also said he was going to reduce the company's pace of acquisitions. He also restarted the company's 60/40 rule, whereby Nestlé only releases products where blind taste-testing experiments show at least 60 percent of consumers prefer it over competing products.

On 1 September 2025, Nestlé announced the immediate dismissal of Freixe citing an undisclosed romantic relationship with an employee that violated the company's code of conduct. The dismissal came following an investigation by the company's board. Freixe did not receive any remuneration on exit and was replaced by Philipp Navratil.

== Personal life ==
Freixe is married to Agata Balcerowska, who is a senior executive at Publicis.
