= Fama Francisco =

- Born: Fatima De Vera Francisco; Manila, Philippines
- Education: University of the Philippines (B.Sc., 1989)
- Occupation: Business executive
- Employer(s): Procter & Gamble
- Known for: CEO, Baby, Feminine and Family Care (P&G)
- Board member of: HP Inc. (2024– ); Nestlé (2026– )

Fama Francisco (born Fatima De Vera Francisco 1968 in the Philippines) is a Filipino–American business executive who is CEO Baby, Feminine and Family Care at Procter & Gamble (P&G). She was a former board member of Organon & Co, a global women’s health company. She has been a member of the board of directors of HP Inc. since 2024, and of Nestlé since April 2026.

== Early life and education ==
Francisco studied in Manila and graduated cum laude in 1989 from the University of the Philippines with a Bachelor of Science in Business Administration and Marketing.

== Career ==
After her graduation, Francisco joined Procter & Gamble in 1989 as the first woman in the Philippines to be hired as a sales manager. She subsequently held several leadership roles within P&G, including Vice President, Global Feminine Care and President, Global Feminine Care. She was later promoted to CEO, Baby, Feminine and Family Care, where she leads a global sector generating USD 20 billion in revenue across 120 countries, with responsibility for 17,000 employees. It consists of P&G’s biggest brand, Pampers, as well as household names such as Always, Tampax, Luvs, Bounty, Charmin and Puffs. She was Gender Equality Executive Sponsor for the company between 2022-2023.

== Awards and recognition ==
- 2018, 2019, 2020: Most Powerful Woman International Fortune
- Excellence in International Business Awardee Rising Star YWCA
- Recognized as Wise Woman by Deloitte Touche
