= Ulf Mark Schneider =

German-American businessperson

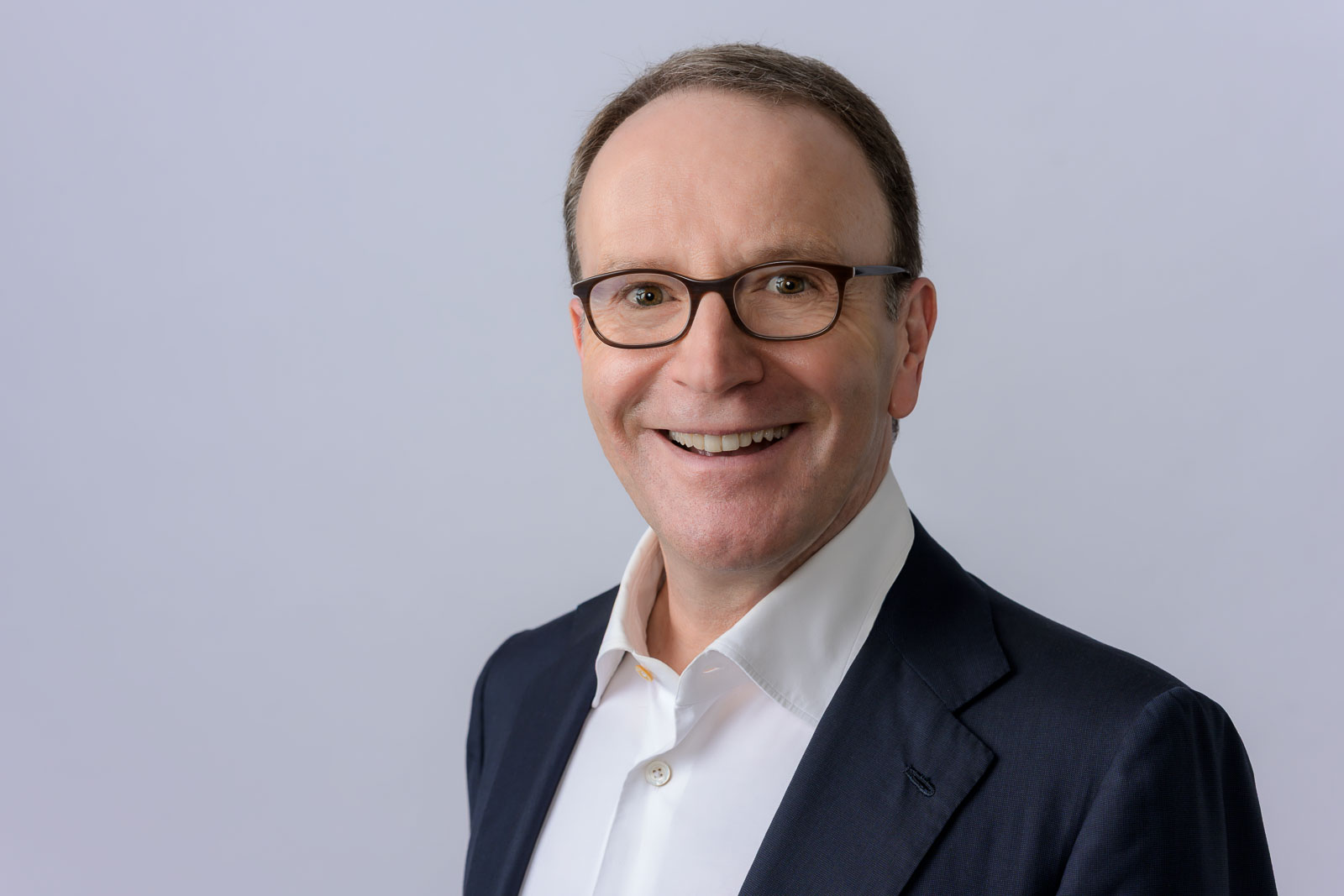
- Schneider in 2026
- Born: 9 September 1965 (age 61); Neuwied, West Germany
- Citizenship: German, American
- Education: University of St. Gallen; Harvard Business School
- Title: former CEO, Nestlé
- Term: 2017–2024
- Predecessor: Paul Bulcke
- Successor: Laurent Freixe
- Spouse: Anne van Aaken
- Children: 1

Ulf Mark Schneider (born 9 September 1965) is a German-American businessman. He was CEO of Nestlé from January 2017 to August 2024, and before that, CEO of the healthcare group Fresenius SE.

== Early life ==
Schneider was born and raised in Neuwied, Germany. He became a U.S. citizen in 2003. He holds a doctorate in economics from the University of St. Gallen, Switzerland, and an MBA from Harvard Business School.

== Career ==
Schneider was group finance director for Gehe UK plc, a pharmaceutical wholesale and retail distributor, in Coventry, England. Schneider held several senior executive positions starting in 1989 with Gehe's majority shareholder, Franz Haniel & Cie., a diversified German industrial company.

Schneider joined Fresenius in November 2001, when he was appointed chief financial officer of Fresenius Medical Care. From May 2003 until June 2016 he was CEO of the parent company Fresenius.

In June 2016, Schneider was appointed CEO of Nestlé S.A., replacing Paul Bulcke. He started as CEO in January 2017. Schneider is the first outsider to run Nestlé since 1922. In 2017, Schneider announced the intent to focus capital spending on higher-growth categories of coffee, pet food, baby food and water and added consumer health to the list of priorities. He divested U.S. confections and ice cream businesses in a multibillion-dollar deals and led acquisitions of Atrium Innovations, Blue Bottle Coffee (majority stake), Sweet Earth Foods, Chameleon Cold-Brew, Tails.com, Freshly, and a major licensing deal to manufacture and sell Starbucks branded packaged coffee and tea.

Schneider took the company out of stagnant product categories like bottled water and expanded into growing markets like supplements and plant proteins. Nestlé completed 85 acquisitions, while also selling many Nestlé businesses like the skincare division in order to focus on the food and beverage markets. Sales growth accelerated. According to Financial Times, Schneider also led "some of the sector’s more ambitious environmental targets," such as a $2 billion effort to improve the recyclability of Nestlé's product packaging.

In March 2022, Denys Shmyhal, the prime minister of Ukraine, criticized Schneider for not showing 'understanding' as the latter reportedly refused to suspend operations of Nestlé in Russia during the invasion of Ukraine. Shmyhal said that 'paying taxes to the budget of a terrorist country means killing defenseless children & mothers'. Nestlé later suspended shipment of non-essential items but continued to produce essential food items in Russia. The company said that "our activities in Russia will focus on providing essential food, such as infant food and medical/hospital nutrition".

Schneider was a member of the Board of Trustees of the World Economic Forum from 2019 to 2024. Since 2023 Schneider has been on the board of directors of Roche and since 2025 has been on the supervisory board of Siemens.

In August 2024, Nestlé announced Schneider would leave as CEO effective 1 September and be replaced by Laurent Freixe. In 2024, Siemens proposed Schneider succeed Jim Hagemann Snabe as chairman.

== Personal life ==
Schneider is married to German lawyer, economist, and professor Anne van Aaken. They have a daughter.
