= Nestlé =

Swiss multinational food and drink company

Nestlé S.A.

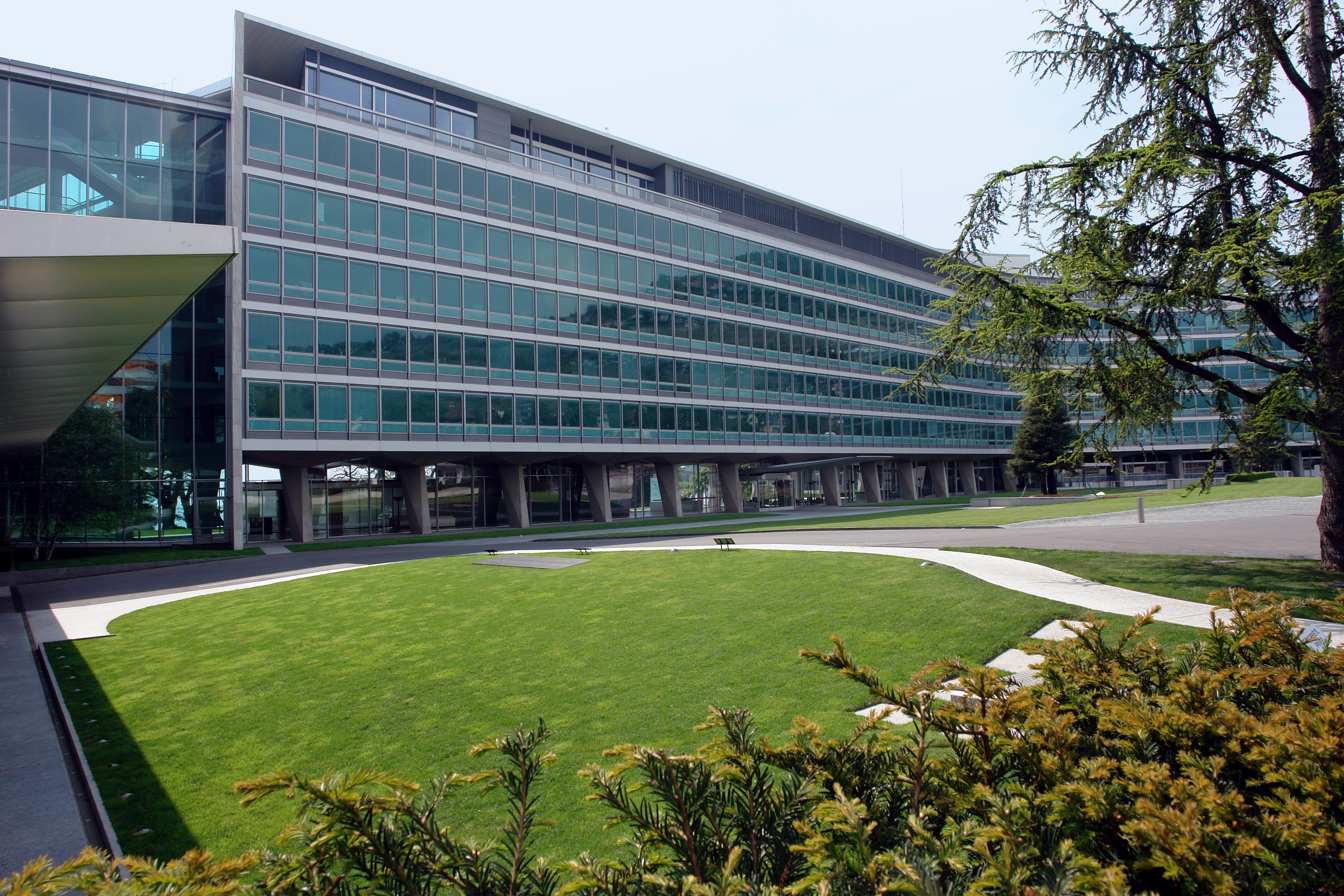
- Headquarters in Vevey, Switzerland
- Formerly: List of former names: Anglo-Swiss Condensed Milk Company (1866–1867); Farine Lactée Henri Nestlé (1867–1905); Nestlé and Anglo-Swiss Condensed Milk Company (1905–1947); Nestlé Alimentana SA (1947–1977)
- Type: Public
- Traded as: SIX: NESN
- ISIN: CH0038863350
- Industry: Food processing
- Founded: 1866; 160 years ago (Anglo-Swiss Condensed Milk Company branch)
- Founder: Henri Nestlé (Farine Lactée Henri Nestlé branch)
- Headquarters: Vevey, Vaud, Switzerland
- Area served: Worldwide
- Key people: Pablo Isla (chairman); Philipp Navratil (CEO); Dick Boer (vice chairman)
- Products: Baby food; coffee; dairy products; breakfast cereals; confectionery; bottled water; ice cream; pet foods; dietary supplements; protein supplements
- Brands: List of Nestlé brands
- Revenue: ▼CHF 89.49 billion (2025)
- Operating income: ▼CHF 12.28 billion (2025)
- Net income: ▼CHF 9.033 billion (2025)
- Total assets: ▼CHF 127.2 billion (2025)
- Total equity: ▼CHF 32.81 billion (2025)
- Number of employees: 271,000 (2025)
- Subsidiaries: Cereal Partners Worldwide (50%)
- Website: nestle.com

Nestlé S.A. (Note: Pronounced /ˈnɛsleɪ, -li/ NESS-lay, -lee; French pronunciation: [nɛsle].) (Note: Not to be confused with Société des Produits Nestlé S.A., the group's intellectual property-holding subsidiary.) is a Swiss multinational food and drink processing conglomerate corporation headquartered in Vevey, Switzerland. It has been the largest publicly held food company in the world, measured by revenue and other metrics, since 2014. It ranked No. 64 on the Fortune Global 500 in 2017. In 2023, the company was ranked 50th in the Forbes Global 2000.

Nestlé's products include coffee and tea, candy and confectionery, bottled water, infant formula and baby food, dairy products and ice cream, frozen foods, breakfast cereals, dry packaged foods and snacks, pet foods, and medical food. Twenty-nine of Nestlé's brands have annual sales of over 1 billion CHF (equivalent to US$1.1 billion), including Nespresso, Nescafé, Nestea, Kit Kat, Smarties, Nesquik, Stouffer Corporation, Vittel, and Maggi. As of 2025, Nestlé has 335 factories, operates in 185 countries, and employs around 271,000 people. It is one of the primary shareholders of L'Oréal, the world's largest cosmetics company.

Nestlé was formed in 1905 by the merger of Anglo-Swiss Condensed Milk Company, which was established in 1866 by brothers George Ham Page and Charles Page, and "Farine Lactée Henri Nestlé" founded in 1867 by Henri Nestlé. The company grew significantly during World War I and again following World War II, expanding its offerings beyond its early condensed milk and infant formula products. The company also expanded through a number of corporate acquisitions.

Nestlé has faced longstanding criticism over its business practices. The company's promotion of infant formula in developing countries resulted in a boycott in the 1970s for discouraging breastfeeding and consequent deaths of over ten million infants. It has also been criticized over links to child labor, forced labor, and deforestation in West African cocoa production, fined for price-fixing cartels, criticized for its water extraction practices, and for plastic pollution.

== History ==
=== 1866–1900: Founding and early years ===
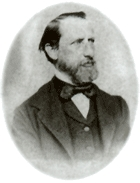
Henri Nestlé (1814–1890), a German-born Swiss confectioner, was the founder of Nestlé and one of the main creators of condensed milk.

Nestlé's origin dates back to the 1860s, when two separate Swiss enterprises were founded that would later form Nestlé. In the following decades, the two competing enterprises expanded their businesses throughout Europe and the United States.

In 1866, Charles Page (US consul to Switzerland) and George Ham Page, brothers from Lee County, Illinois, established the Anglo-Swiss Condensed Milk Company in Cham, Switzerland. The company's first British operation was opened at Chippenham, Wiltshire in 1873.

In 1867, Henri Nestlé developed milk-based baby food and soon began marketing it from Vevey, Switzerland. The following year, Daniel Peter began seven years of work developing the milk chocolate manufacturing process. Nestlé had the solution, Peter needed to fix his problem of removing all the water from the milk added to his chocolate, thus preventing the product from developing mildew.

In 1875, Henri Nestlé retired; the company, under new ownership, retained his name as Société Farine Lactée Henri Nestlé.

In 1877, Anglo-Swiss added milk-based baby foods to its products; in the following year, the Nestlé Company added condensed milk to its portfolio, which made the firms direct rivals.

In 1879, Nestlé merged with milk chocolate inventor Daniel Peter.

=== 1901–1989: Mergers ===
In the late 19th and early 20th century, Henri Nestlé and his successors participated in the development of the chocolate industry in Switzerland, together with the Peter, Kohler, and Cailler families. In 1904, Daniel Peter and Charles-Amédée Kohler (son of Charles-Amédée Kohler who founded a chocolate factory in 1830) became partners and founded the Société générale suisse des chocolats Peter et Kohler réunis. In 1911, the company created by Peter and Kohler merged with Cailler. In 1929, Peter, Cailler, Kohler, Chocolats Suisses finally merged with the Nestlé group. An earlier partnership in 1904 between Peter and Nestlé also allowed the production of milk chocolate in the United States, at the Fulton plant.

In 1905, Nestlé and Anglo-Swiss merged to become the Nestlé and Anglo-Swiss Condensed Milk Company, retaining that name until 1947 when the name 'Nestlé Alimentana SA' was taken as a result of the acquisition of Fabrique de Produits Maggi SA (founded 1884) and its holding company, Alimentana SA, of Kempttal, Switzerland. The company's current name was adopted in 1977. By the early 1900s, the company was operating factories in the United States, the United Kingdom, Germany, and Spain. The First World War created a demand for dairy products in the form of government contracts, and by the end of the war, Nestlé's production had more than doubled.

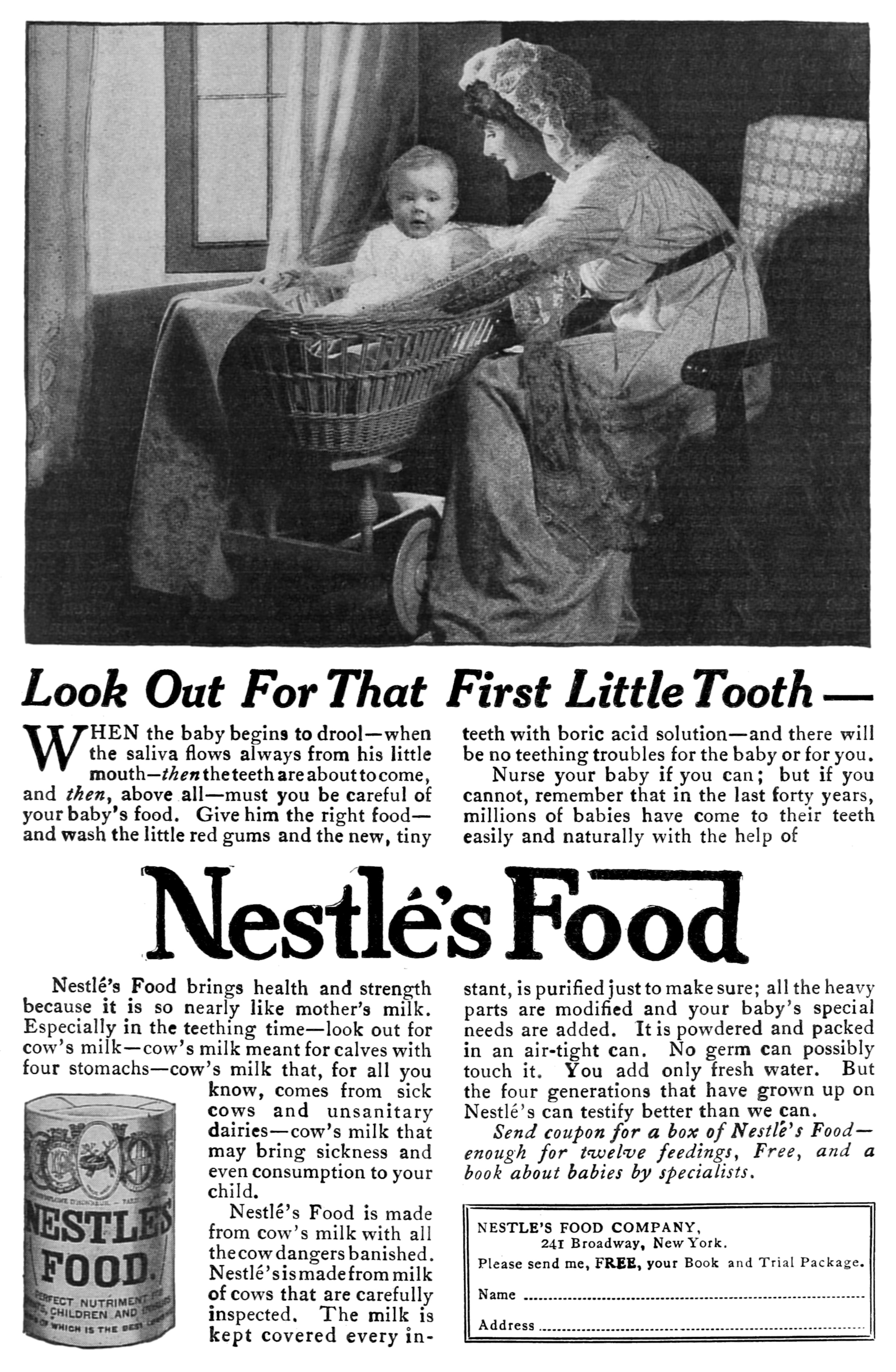
A 1915 advertisement for "Nestlés Food", an early infant formula

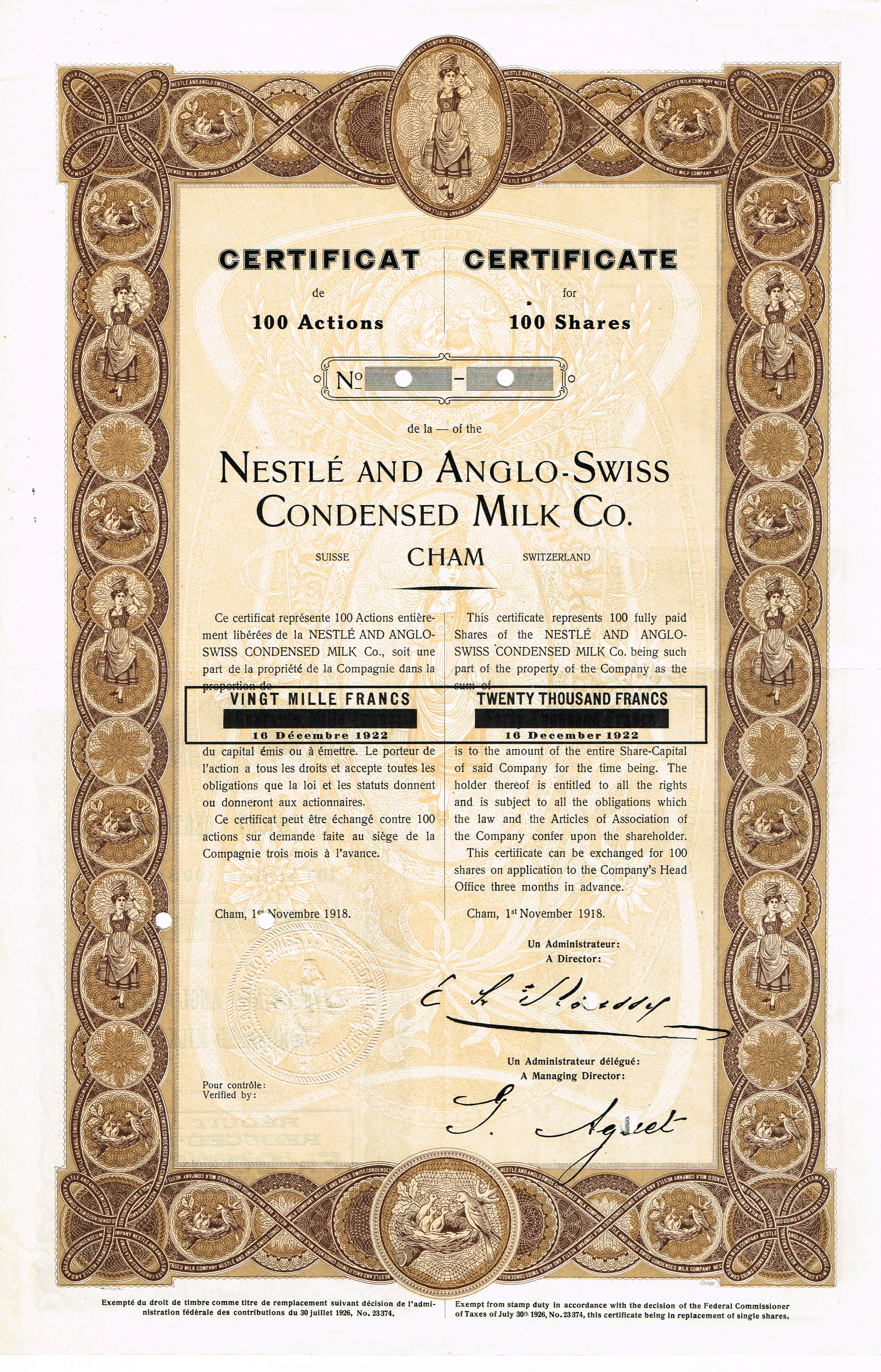
Certificate for 100 shares of the Nestlé and Anglo-Swiss Condensed Milk Co., issued 1. November 1918

In January 1919, Nestlé bought two condensed milk plants in Oregon from the company Geibisch and Joplin for $250,000. One was in Bandon, while the other was in Milwaukie. They expanded them considerably, processing 250,000 pounds of condensed milk daily in the Bandon plant.

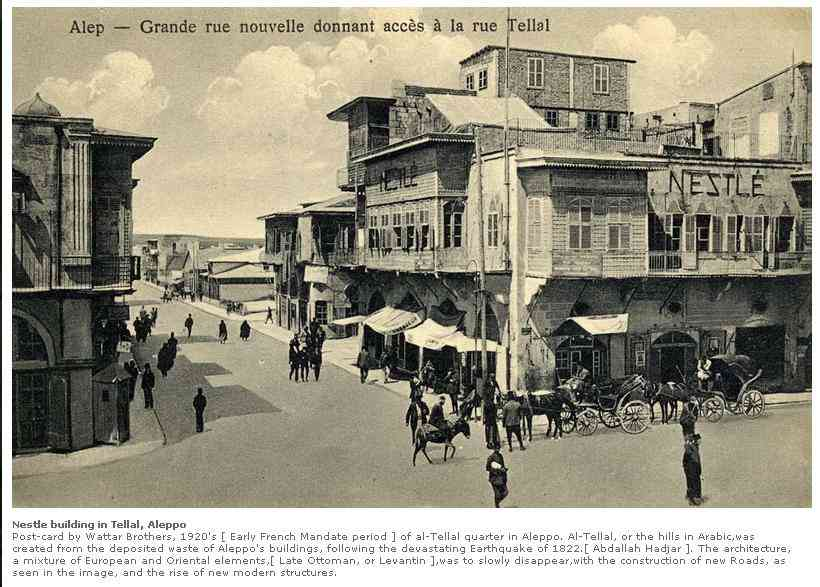
Aleppo Nestlé building Tilal street 1920s

After World War I, government contracts dried up, and consumers switched back to fresh milk. Nestlé's management responded by streamlining operations and reducing debt. The 1920s saw Nestlé's first expansion into new products, with chocolate-manufacture becoming the company's second most important activity; white chocolate was created in the following decade, as the Milkybar. Louis Dapples was CEO until 1937 when succeeded by Édouard Muller until his death in 1948.

Nestlé felt the effects of the Second World War immediately. Profits dropped from US$20 million in 1938 to US$6 million in 1939. Factories were established in developing countries, particularly in South America. During the war, Nestlé introduction its newest product, Nescafé ("Nestlé's Coffee"), which became a staple drink of the US military. The company also had a contract to supply the German army. Nestlé's production and sales rose in the wartime economy.

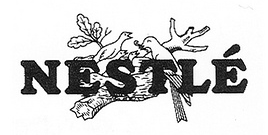
The logo that Nestlé used from 1938 to 1966

The end of World War II was the beginning of a dynamic phase for Nestlé. Growth accelerated and numerous companies were acquired. In 1947 Nestlé merged with Maggi, a manufacturer of seasonings and soups. Crosse & Blackwell followed in 1960, as did Findus (1963), Libby's (1971), Ursina-Franck (1971), and Stouffer's (1973). Diversification came under chairman & CEO Pierre Liotard-Vogt with a shareholding in L'Oreal in 1974 and the acquisition of Alcon Laboratories Inc. in 1977 for $280 million.

In the 1980s, Nestlé's improved bottom line allowed the company to launch further acquisitions. Carnation was acquired for US$3 billion in 1984 and brought the evaporated milk brand, as well as Coffee-Mate and Friskies, to Nestlé. In 1986, the company founded Nestlé Nespresso S.A. The British confectionery company Rowntree Mackintosh was acquired in 1988 for $4.5 billion, which brought brands such as Kit Kat, Rolo, Smarties, and Aero.

=== 1990–2011: International growth ===
The first half of the 1990s was a period of expansion for Nestlé. Trade barriers were reduced, and world markets developed into more or less integrated trading areas. Late 1990s acquisitions included San Pellegrino (1997), D'Onofrio (1997), and Spillers Petfoods (1998). In 1999, Nestlé sold the Findus brand to the Swedish firm EQT AB.

In the early 2000s, acquisitions in North America included Ralston Purina (2002), Dreyer's ice cream, and a US$2.6 billion acquisition of Chef America, the creator of Hot Pockets. In this period, Nestlé entered in a joint bid with Cadbury and came close to purchasing the American company Hershey's, one of its major confectionery competitors, but the deal eventually fell through.

In December 2005, Nestlé bought the Greek company Delta Ice Cream for €240 million. In January 2006, it took full ownership of Dreyer's, thus becoming the world's largest ice cream maker, with a 17.5% market share. In June 2006, Nestlé purchased weight-loss company Jenny Craig for US$600 million. In July 2007, completing a deal announced the year before, Nestlé acquired the Medical Nutrition division of Novartis Pharmaceutical for US$2.5 billion and also acquiring the milk-flavoring product known as Ovaltine, the "Boost" and "Resource" lines of nutritional supplements, and Optifast dieting products.

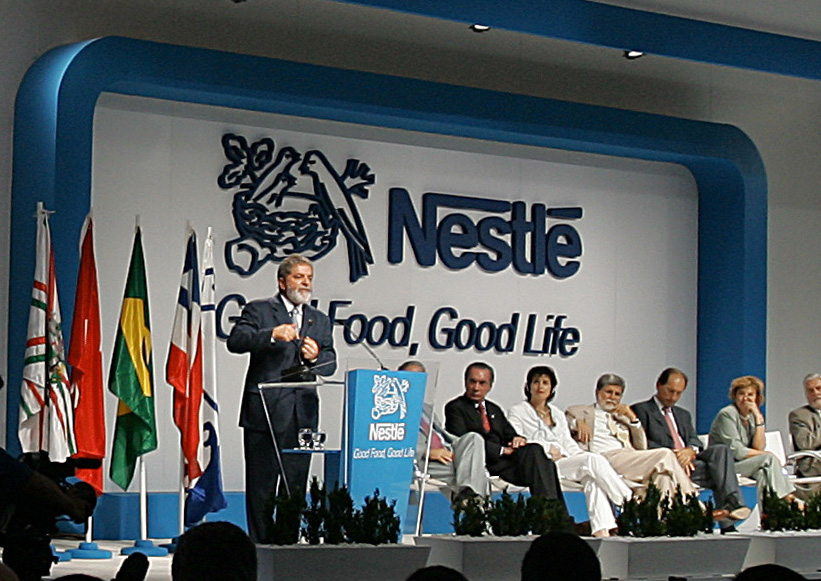
The Brazilian president, Lula da Silva, inaugurates a factory in Feira de Santana (Bahia), in February 2007.

In April 2007, Nestlé bought US baby-food manufacturer Gerber for US$5.5 billion. In December 2007, Nestlé entered into a strategic partnership with a Belgian chocolate maker, Pierre Marcolini.

In late September 2008, the Hong Kong government found melamine in a Chinese-made Nestlé milk product. Six infants died from kidney damage, and a further 860 babies were hospitalised. The following June, an outbreak of E. coli O157:H7 was linked to Nestlé's refrigerated cookie dough originating in a plant in Danville, Virginia.

Nestlé agreed to sell its controlling stake in Alcon to Novartis on 4 January 2010. The sale was to form part of a broader US$39.3 billion offer by Novartis, for full acquisition of the world's largest eye-care company. On 2 March 2010, Nestlé completed the purchase of Kraft Foods's North American frozen pizza business for US$3.7 billion, which included brands such as DiGiorno, Tombstone, and California Pizza Kitchen.

Since 2010, Nestlé has been working to transform itself into a nutrition, health and wellness company, in an effort to combat declining confectionery sales and increasing government regulation of such foods. The Health Science branch has since produced several products, such as drinks and protein shakes for malnutrition, diabetes, digestive health, obesity, and other diseases.

Nestlé acquired British pharmaceutical company Vitaflo, which makes clinical nutritional products for people with genetic disorders, in August 2010. In July 2011, Nestlé SA agreed to buy 60 percent of Hsu Fu Chi International Ltd. for about US$1.7 billion. On 23 April 2012, Nestlé agreed to acquire Pfizer Inc.'s infant-nutrition, formerly Wyeth Nutrition, unit for US$11.9 billion, topping a joint bid from Danone and Mead Johnson.

=== 2012–2020: Further growth and acquisitions ===
In recent years, Nestlé Health Science has made several acquisitions: CM&D Pharma Ltd., a company that specialises in the development of products for patients with chronic conditions like kidney disease; and Prometheus Laboratories, a firm specialising in treatments for gastrointestinal diseases and cancer. It also holds a minority stake in Vital Foods, a New Zealand-based company that develops kiwifruit-based food products as of 2012.

In 2012, Nestlé developed the Rural Development Framework, an investment program supporting infrastructure and labor conditions for farmers and cocoa growing communities.

Nestlé sold its Jenny Craig business unit to North Castle Partners in 2013. In February 2013, Nestlé Health Science bought Pamlab, which makes medical foods based on L-methylfolate targeting depression, diabetes, and memory loss. In February 2014, Nestlé sold its PowerBar sports nutrition business to Post Holdings, Inc. Later, in November 2014, Nestlé announced that it was exploring strategic options for its frozen food subsidiary, Davigel.

In December 2014, Nestlé announced that it was opening 10 skin care research centres worldwide, deepening its investment in a faster-growing market for healthcare products. That year, Nestlé spent about $350 million on dermatology research and development. The first of the research hubs, Nestlé Skin Health Investigation, Education and Longevity Development (SHIELD) centres, opened in 2015 in New York. The initiative was being launched in partnership with the Global Coalition on Aging (GCOA), a consortium that includes companies such as Intel and Bank of America.

In May 2015, food safety regulators from the state of Uttar Pradesh, India, found that samples of Nestlé India's Maggi noodles had up to 17 times more than the permissible limit of lead, in addition to monosodium glutamate.

In 2016, Nestlé and PAI Partners established a joint venture, Froneri, to combine the two companies' ice cream activities throughout Europe and other international countries.

In January 2017, Nestlé announced that it was relocating its US headquarters from Glendale, California, to Rosslyn, Virginia. In March 2017, Nestlé announced that they would lower the sugar content in Kit Kat, Yorkie and Aero chocolate bars by 10% by 2018. In July, a similar announcement followed concerning the reduction of sugar content in its breakfast cereals in the UK. In March 2017, Nestlé and Coca-Cola agreed to dissolve the Beverage Partners Worldwide venture effective on 1 January 2018, in part because Nestlé wanted to expand Nestea on its own.

The company announced a $20.8 billion share buyback in June 2017, following the publication of a letter written by Third Point Management founder Daniel S. Loeb, Nestlé's fourth-largest stakeholder with a $3.5 billion stake, explaining how the firm should change its business structure to focus more on coffee, pet care, and consumer health-care. In July 2017, Nestlé introduced a new type of infant formula in Spain, containing two human milk oligosaccharides. Oligosaccharides are the third most abundant components of breast milk, but previously were not part of infant formula.

In September 2017, Nestlé S.A. acquired a majority stake of Blue Bottle Coffee. While the deal's financial details were not disclosed, the Financial Times reported "Nestlé is understood to be paying up to $500m for the 68 per cent stake in Blue Bottle". In September 2017, Nestlé USA agreed to acquire Sweet Earth, a California-based producer of plant-based foods, for an undisclosed sum. Nestlé set a new profit target in September 2017 and agreed to offload over 20 of its US candy brands in January 2018. However, sales grew only 2.4% in 2017, and as of July 2018, the share price declined more than 8%. While some suggestions were adopted, Loeb said in a July 2018 letter that the shifts are too small and too slow. In a statement, Nestlé wrote that it was "delivering results" and listed actions it had taken, including investing in key brands and its global coffee partnership with Starbucks. However, activist investors disagreed, leading Third Point Management to launch NestleNOW, a website to push its case with recommendations calling for change, accusing Nestlé of not being as fast, aggressive, or strategic as it needed to be. Activist investors called for Nestlé to divide into three units with distinct CEOs, regional structures, and marketing heads - beverage, nutrition, and grocery; spin off more businesses that do not fit its model such as ice cream, frozen foods, and confectionery; and add an outsider with expertise in the food and beverage industry to the board.

In January 2018, Nestlé USA announced it was selling its US confectionary business, including the 100 Grand, BabyRuth, Butterfinger, OhHenry!, Raisinets and SnoCaps to Ferrara Candy Company, an American-based chocolate and candy maker and Ferrero-related company. The company was sold for a total of an estimated $2.8 billion. In May 2018, it was announced that Nestlé and Starbucks struck a $7.15 billion distribution deal, which allows Nestlé to market, sell and distribute Starbucks coffee globally and to incorporate the brand's coffee varieties into Nestlé's proprietary single-serve system.

In September 2018, Nestlé announced that it would sell Gerber Life Insurance for $1.55 billion. In October 2018, Nestlé announced the launch of the Nestlé Alumni Network, through a strategic partnership with SAP & EnterpriseAlumni, to engage with their over 1 million corporate alumni globally.

In 2019, the company announced that it would publish Nutri-Score on all of its products sold in the European countries that supported the nutritional label.

In 2020, Nestlé USA's and Nestlé Canada's ice cream divisions were acquired by Froneri. Also during that year, Nestlé announced plans to invest in plant-based food.

=== 2021–present ===
The COVID-19 pandemic did not affect Nestlé negatively. Due to lockdowns, people bought more packaged foods, not only coffee and dairy products, but also pet products, which increased the company's sales. In 2021, Nestlé recorded its strongest quarterly sales growth in 10 years.

On 16 February 2021, Nestlé announced that it had agreed to sell its water brands in the US and Canada to One Rock Capital Partners and Metropoulos & Co. The sale would include the spring water and mountain brands, the purified water brand and the delivery service. The plan did not include the Perrier, S.Pellegrino and Acqua Panna brands. In early April 2021, the sale was concluded.

In April 2021, Nestlé agreed to purchase the vitamin manufacturing Bountiful Company, formerly known as The Nature's Bounty Co., for $5.75 billion. Bountiful's brands included Nature's Bounty, Solgar, Osteo Bi-Flex, and Puritan's Pride.

In July 2021, Vitaflo International Ltd. (subsidiary to Nestlé Health Science since 2010) acquired the Dr. Schär brands, Mevalia and ComidaMed, which are used for the dietary management of IEM and cow's milk protein allergy to complement Vitaflo's existing IEM product portfolio.

In January 2022, Nestlé announced that it would pay African cocoa farmers cash if they sent their children to school, in response to criticisms that Nestlé was profiting from child labor.

In May 2022, it was announced Nestlé's Health Science unit had acquired the Brazilian organic, natural, plant-based food maker Puravida.

In May 2022, Nestlé was sending baby formula supplies to the U.S. from European air bases to ease the 2022 United States infant formula shortage. These relief shipments included products from the Gerber baby food formula brand from the Netherlands and Alfamino baby formula from Switzerland.

In September 2023, it was announced Nestlé had acquired a majority stake in the Extrema, Minas Gerais-headquartered premium chocolate manufacturer, Grupo CRM for an undisclosed amount.

Following the 2022 Russian invasion of Ukraine, the company continued doing business in Russia; therefore in November 2023, Ukraine's National Agency on Corruption Prevention listed Nestlé as an International Sponsor of War. Nestlé stated that it had already "halted all non-essential imports and exports to and from Russia". In September 2026, Nestlé's Russian operations were transferred by presidential decree to Moscow-based LEV Management; Nestlé said it remained the legal owner, but wrote off SFr1.6bn ($1.95bn) in net assets.

In February 2024, it was announced Nestlé is expanding manufacturing capacity in India and increasing investments — the company would invest between ₹60-65 billion ($723–783 million) from 2020 to 2025.

Nestlé announced Schneider would leave his position as CEO and be replaced by Laurent Freixe on 1 September 2024.

In May 2025, Nestlé acquired an minority stake in Drools Pet Food in India.

In September 2025, Nestlé announced the immediate dismissal of its chief executive, Laurent Freixe, following an investigation by its board that found he had an undisclosed romantic relationship with an employee. Freixe did not receive any remuneration on exit.

Following the dismissal of Freixe, Nestlé appointed Philipp Navratil as its new chief executive. Navratil has held several positions across the company after joining in 2001.

In September 2025, Nestlé announced Bulcke would leave his position as chairman of the board at the end of September, six months earlier than planned, as part of an accelerated management transition.

In October 2025, Nestlé announced it would cut 16,000 jobs and assess the possibility of selling some of its 2,000-plus brands.

On 18 December 2025, Nestlé announced the expansion of its Materna range, designed to support the post-birth recovery of mothers. This is built on the existing range which was introduced in 2024 to support women's health including pre-conception.

In January 2026, Nestlé recalled infant formula products sold in Europe, Turkey and Argentina due to potential cereulide toxin contamination. Austria's health ministry described the recall as the largest recall in Nestle's history. By 9 January, the recall had expanded to 49 countries in Europe, Asia, the Middle East, and South America.

In March 2026, Nestlé reached an agreement to sell Blue Bottle Coffee to Centurium Capital. At the time, Blue Bottle Coffee was operating at a loss.

== Brands ==
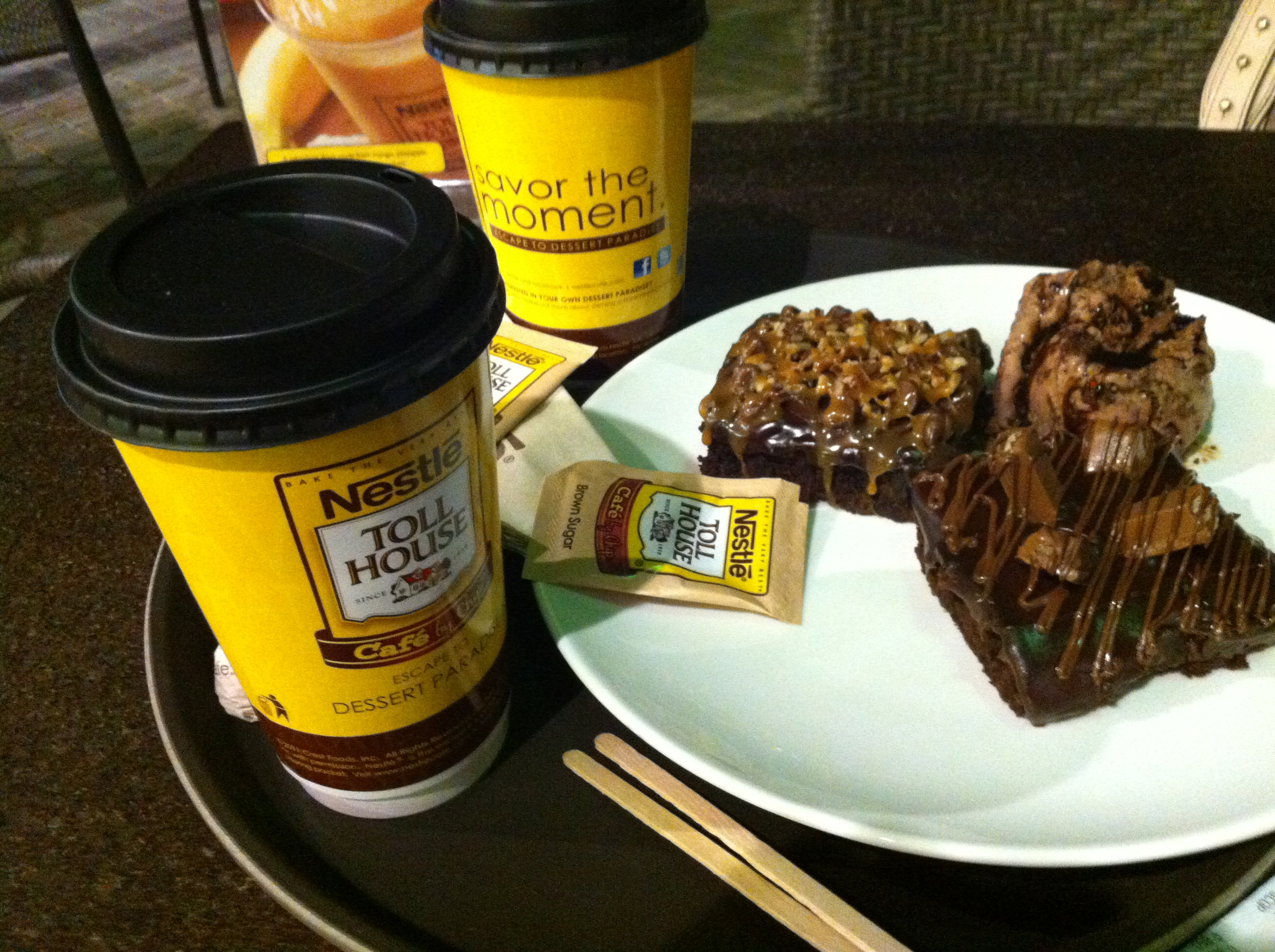
Samples of Nestlé Toll House Cafe items in 2012

Nestlé currently has over 2,000 brands with a wide range of products across a number of markets, including coffee, bottled water, milkshakes and other beverages, breakfast cereals, infant foods, performance and healthcare nutrition, seasonings, soups and sauces, frozen and refrigerated foods, and pet food. In 2019, the company entered the plant-based food production business with its Incredible and Awesome Burgers (under the Garden Gourmet and Sweet Earth brands). In 2020, Nestlé announced additional plant-based products including soy-based bratwurst and chorizo-like sausages.

== Corporate affairs and governance ==
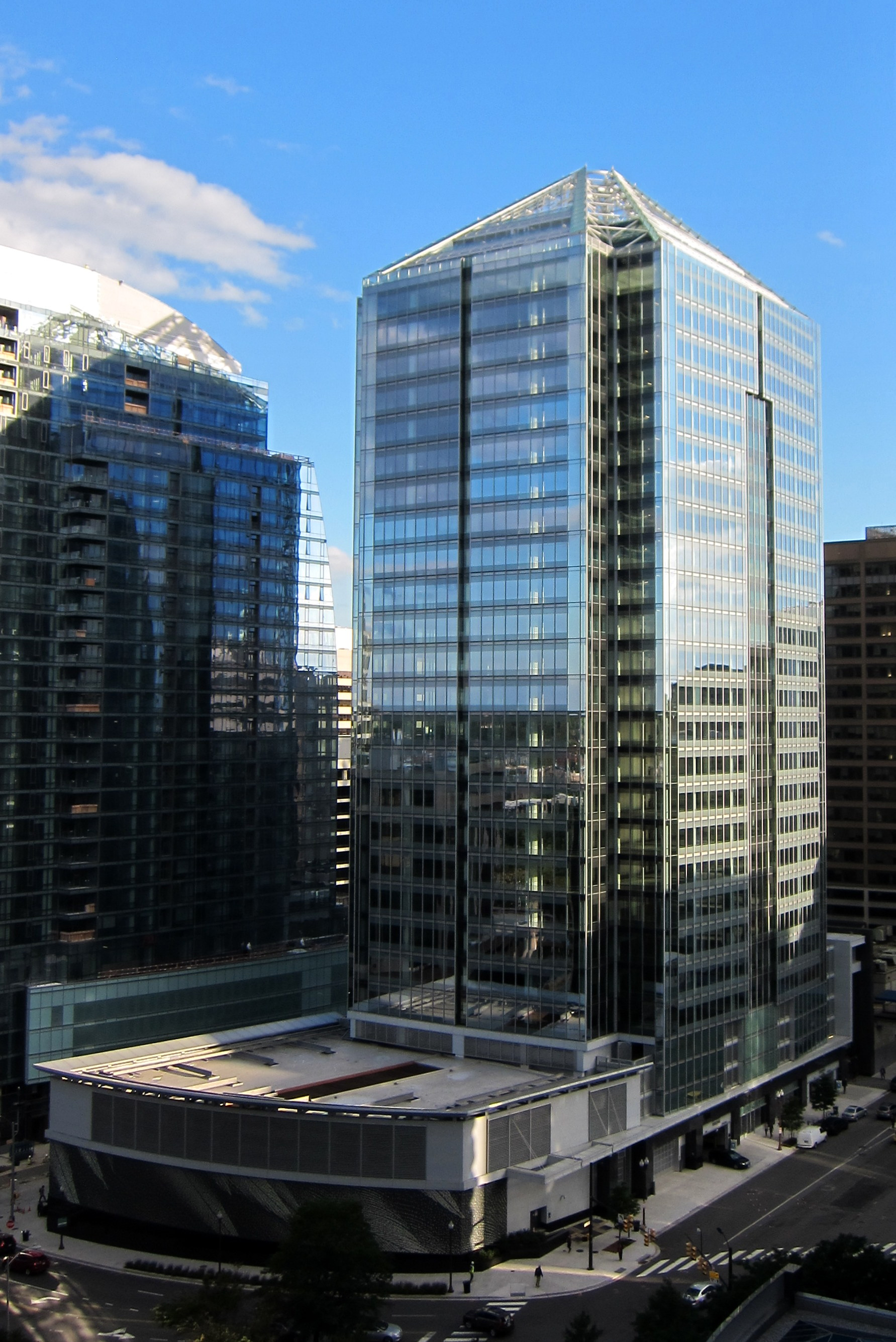
Nestlé USA headquarters at 1812 N Moore in Arlington, Virginia

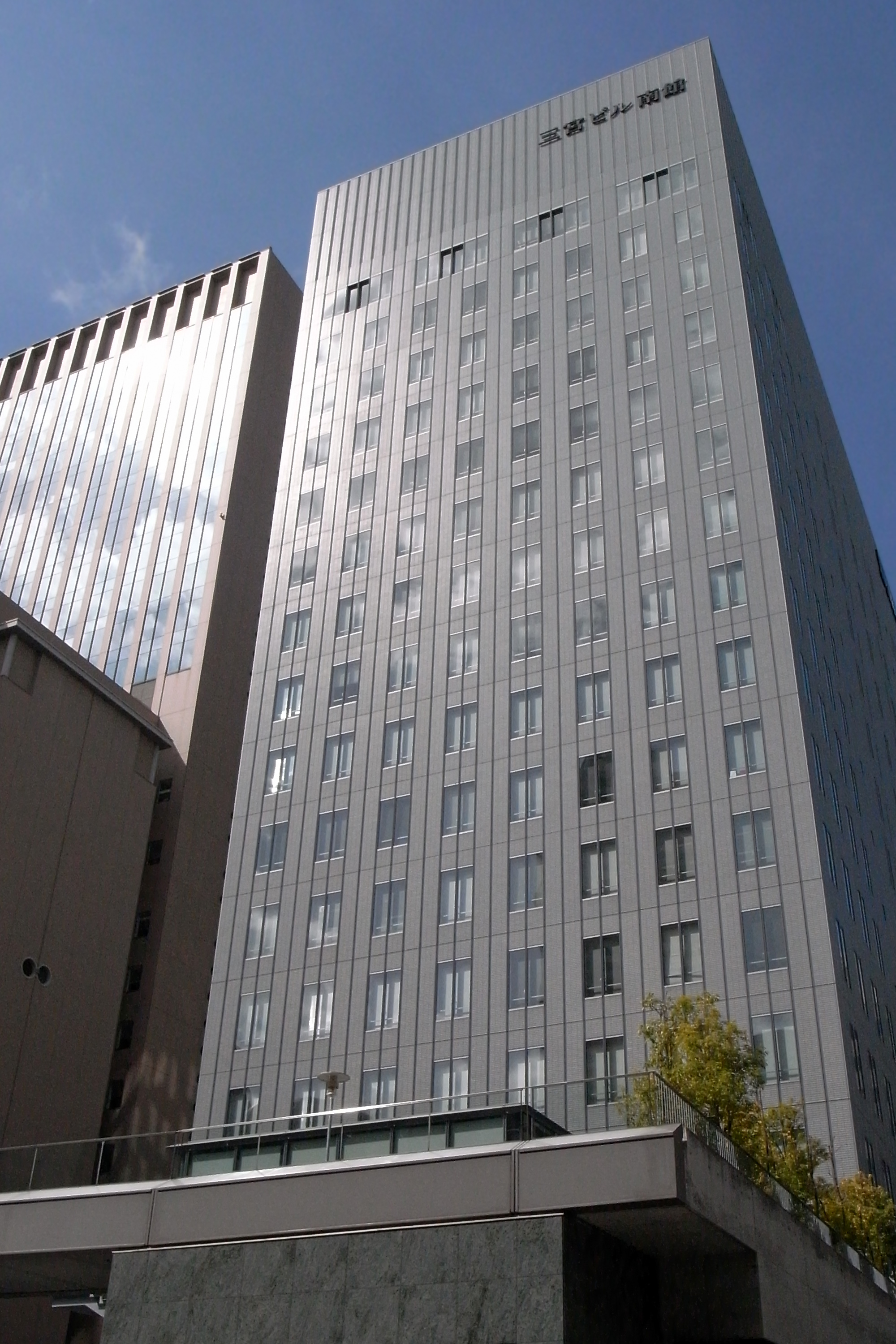
Nestlé Japan headquarters in Nestlé House building, Kobe, Japan

Nestlé is the biggest food company in the world, with a market capitalisation of roughly 203 billion Swiss francs as of December 2025. Nestlé has a primary listing on the SIX Swiss Exchange and is a constituent of the Swiss Market Index. It previously had a secondary listing on Euronext.

In 2025, consolidated sales were CHF 89.49 billion and net profit was CHF 9.03 billion. Research and development investment was CHF 1.61 billion.

- Sales per category in CHF
  - 28.1% powdered and liquid beverages
  - 10.8% milk products and ice cream
  - 11.3% prepared dishes and cooking aids
  - 16.0% nutrition and health science
  - 20.6% pet care
  - 9.7% confectionery
  - 3.5% water
- Percentage of sales by geographic area breakdown
  - 48% from Americas
  - 25% from Europe
  - 27% from Asia, Oceania and Africa

=== Financial data ===
Financial data in billions of CHF
Year	2011	2012	2013	2014	2015	2016	2017	2018	2019	2020	2021	2022	2023	2024	2025
Revenue	83.642	92.186	92.158	91.612	88.785	89.469	89.791	91.439	92.568	84.343	87.088	94.780	93.351	91.720	89.490
Net income	9.487	10.611	10.015	14.456	9.066	8.531	7.183	10.135	12.609	12.232	17.196	9.270	11.209	10.884	9.033
Assets	114.091	126.229	120.442	133.450	123.992	131.901	130.380	137.015	127.940	124.028	139.142	135.182	126.550	139.264	127.151
Employees	328,000	339,000	333,000	339,000	335,000	328,000	323,000	308,000	291,000	273,000	276,000		275,000	277,000	271.000

Capital ownership of Nestlé by country of origin as of 2023:
1. Switzerland (46.6%)
2. United States (31.2%)
3. All others (22.2%)

=== Joint ventures ===
Important joint ventures include:

- Cereal Partners Worldwide with General Mills for cereals (50%/50%)
- Froneri with PAI Partners for ice cream (50%/50%)
- Nestlé with PAI Partners for frozen pizzas in Europe
- Nestlé with Starbucks global licensing agreement for consumer packaged goods, in particular coffee outside of Starbucks Cafés
- Lactalis Nestlé Produits Frais with Lactalis (40%/60%)
- Nestlé Indofood Citarasa Indonesia with Indofood (50%/50%)
- Nestlé Snow with Snow Brand Milk Products (50%/50%)
- Nestlé Modelo with Grupo Modelo for distribution of bottled water

=== CEO ===
Chief executive officer:

- 1981-1997 : Helmut Maucher;
- 1997-2008 : Peter Brabeck-Letmathe;
- 2008-2016 : Paul Bulcke;
- 2017-2024 : Ulf Mark Schneider;
- 2024-2025 : Laurent Freixe;
- 2025–present: Philipp Navratil.

=== Board of directors ===
As of 2026, the board is composed of:

- Pablo Isla, chairman
- Dick Boer, Vice Chair, Lead Independent Director, former president and CEO, Ahold Delhaize N.V.
- Marie-Gabrielle Ineichen-Fleisch, Vice Chair, former Director of the Swiss State Secretariat for Economic Affairs (SECO)
- Renato Fassbind, former CEO of DKSH and former CFO of Credit Suisse
- Patrick Aebischer, former president of École Polytechnique Fédérale de Lausanne
- Dinesh Paliwal, former president and CEO, Harman International Industries Inc.
- Lindiwe M. Sibanda, Professor Extraordinary, University of Pretoria, RSA
- Luca Maestri, Vice President, Corporate Services, Apple Inc.
- Chris Leong, Chief Marketing and Innovation Officer, Ecolab Inc.
- Rainer Blair, President and CEO, Danaher Corporation
- Geraldine Matchett, former Co-Chief Executive Officer and CFO, DSM-Firmenich
- Thomas Jordan, former chairman of the Swiss National Bank
- Fama Francisco, CEO Baby, Feminine and Family Care at Procter & Gamble

=== Lobbying ===
The company engages third party lobbying firms to engage with parliaments and governments in various jurisdictions. For example, in South Australia the company engages Etched Communications. In the US, from 2015 to 2020, Nestlé's average spend on lobbying was $1,951,667 each year.

== Controversies ==
Nestlé has faced criticism and boycotts over its marketing of baby formula (and the consequent millions of infant deaths.), child labour in cocoa production, and its production and promotion of bottled water.

Concern about Nestlé's "aggressive marketing" of their breast milk substitutes, particularly in less economically developed countries (LEDCs), first arose in the 1970s. Critics have accused Nestlé of discouraging mothers from breastfeeding and suggesting that their baby formula is healthier than breastfeeding. This led to the 1977 Nestlé boycott in the United States and Europe.

Reports have documented the widespread use of child labour and reported cases of slavery and child trafficking by cocoa suppliers, in West African plantations, on which Nestlé and other major chocolate companies rely.

In 2025, Nestlé was criticized by environmental researchers at NewClimate Institute and Carbon Market Watch for overstating its progress on reducing methane emissions from livestock and fertilizer and overrelying on greenhouse gas removal rather than source reduction. Nestlé responded that 91% of its reduction in greenhouse gas emissions in 2024 was due to source reduction, and that it had reduced methane emissions significantly since 2018. A 2024 study published in Science Advances found that Nestlé was responsible for 3% of global branded plastic pollution (by count), which was the 3rd highest share of branded plastic pollution globally.

== Sponsorships ==
=== Music and entertainment ===
In 1993, plans were made to update and modernise the overall tone of Walt Disney's EPCOT Center, including a major refurbishment of The Land pavilion. Kraft Foods withdrew its sponsorship on 26 September 1993, with Nestlé taking its place. Co-financed by Nestlé and the Walt Disney World Resort, a gradual refurbishment of the pavilion began on 27 September 1993. In 2003, Nestlé renewed its sponsorship of The Land; however, it was under agreement that Nestlé would oversee its own refurbishment to both the interior and exterior of the pavilion. Between 2004 and 2005, the pavilion underwent its second major refurbishment. Nestlé stopped sponsoring The Land in 2009.

On 5 August 2010, Nestlé and the Beijing Music Festival signed an agreement to extend by three years Nestlé's sponsorship of this international music festival. Nestlé has been an extended sponsor of the Beijing Music Festival for 11 years since 2000. The new agreement will continue the partnership through 2013.

Nestlé has partnered the Salzburg Festival in Austria for 20 years. In 2011, Nestlé renewed its sponsorship of the Salzburg Festival until 2015.

Together, they have created the "Nestlé and Salzburg Festival Young Conductors Award", an initiative that aims to discover young conductors globally and to contribute to the development of their careers.

=== Sports ===
Nestlé's sponsorship of the Tour de France began in 2001 and the agreement was extended in 2004. In July 2009, Nestlé Waters and the organisers of the Tour de France announced that their partnership will continue until 2013. The partnership promoted four brands from Nestlé: Vittel, Powerbar, Nesquik, and Ricore.

On 27 January 2012, the International Association of Athletics Federations announced that Nestlé would be the main sponsor of the IAAF's Kids' Athletics Programme, a grassroots development programme. The five-year sponsorship started in January 2012. On 11 February 2016, Nestlé decided to withdraw its sponsorship of the IAAF's Kids' Athletics Programmes because of doping and corruption allegations against the IAAF. Nestlé followed suit after other large sponsors, including Adidas, also stopped supporting the IAAF.

In 2014, Nestlé Waters sponsored the UK leg of the Tour de France through its Buxton Natural Mineral Water brand. In 2002, Nestlé announced it was main sponsor for the Great Britain Lionesses Women's rugby league team for the team's second tour of Australia with its Munchies product.

Nestlé supports nutrition and fitness activities at Australian Institute of Sport (AIS), including a Fellowship position in AIS Sports Nutrition; nutrition activities in the AIS Dining Hall; research activities; and the development of education resources for use at the AIS and in the public domain.

== Awards ==
Year	Brand	Award	Result
2010	Nestlé Purina	Malcolm Baldrige National Quality Award	Won
2010	—N/a	IUoFST Gold Food Industry Award	Won
2011	—N/a	World Environment Center Gold Medal Award	Won
2014	—N/a	Henry Spira Corporate Progress Award	Won

== See also ==
- Big Chocolate
- Controversies of Nestle
- Farfel the Dog
- List of Nestlé brands
- Nestlé Smarties Book Prize
- Nestlé Tower
- Ultra-processed food

Competitors

- Coca-Cola Company
- Danone
- Ferrero SpA
- General Mills
- The Hershey Company
- Highland Spring
- Kellogg's
- Kraft Heinz
- Lactalis
- Mars, Inc.
- Mondelez International
- Müller
- PepsiCo
- Post Holdings
- Unilever
