= Journal of International Dispute Settlement =

- Discipline: International law
- Language: English
- Edited by: Thomas Schultz

Publication details
- History: 2010–present
- Publisher: Oxford University Press
- Frequency: Quarterly
- Impact factor: 0.9 (2023)

Standard abbreviations
- ISO 4: J. Int. Dispute Settl.

Indexing
- ISSN: 2040-3585 (print); 2040-3593 (web)

Links
- Journal homepage

The Journal of International Dispute Settlement is a quarterly peer-reviewed academic journal covering international dispute resolution in a combination of theoretical and practical approaches. The journal is hosted by the University of Geneva law school and the Geneva Graduate Institute. It was established in 2010 by Thomas Schultz (King's College London, University of Geneva, and Geneva Graduate Institute). It is published by Oxford University Press. The journal has a 2023 impact factor of 0.9.

== See also ==
- European Journal of International Law
- Journal of International Economic Law
- List of international relations journals
- List of law journals
