= Investment protection =

Investment protection is a broad economic term referring to any form of guarantee or insurance that investments made will not be lost, which may be through fraud or otherwise. For example, the Investment Protection Bureau is a New York state legal body which is charged, according to the New York State Securities Law (the Martin Act), to protect the public from fraud by monitoring and limiting investment. Most other protection is of this form, monitoring brokers and comparable individuals, and legally preventing them from misusing investment.

Investment protection treaties (also called Bilateral Investments Protection and Promotion Agreements (BIPA) or Investments Protection and Promotion Agreements (IPPA)) are widely used in bilateral agreements between two states, as a means of making foreign investment more attractive. A similar multilateral agreement can exist under the Multilateral Investment Guarantee Agency (MIGA). There are approximately 2500 BIPA among states. Attempts to create an all-encompassing multilateral investment treaty that covers and regulates most such exchanges have thus far failed to materialize.

== BIPA and Nepal ==
On 21 October 2011, Nepal entered into BIPA with India during an official visit of Prime-minister Dr. Baburam Bhattarai. Returning home, he faced political obstacles from his own ruling party chauvinist wing. In the airport he faced black-flags welcome and was criticized in parliamentary meeting as well as in party meeting. No one knew that Nepal already had another 5 BIPAs since 1983.

== See also ==
- Credit default swap
- Financial regulation
- Financial risk
- Hedge (finance)
- Letter of credit
- Trade credit insurance
