= Brooklyn, Portland, Oregon =

Brooklyn
- Neighborhood
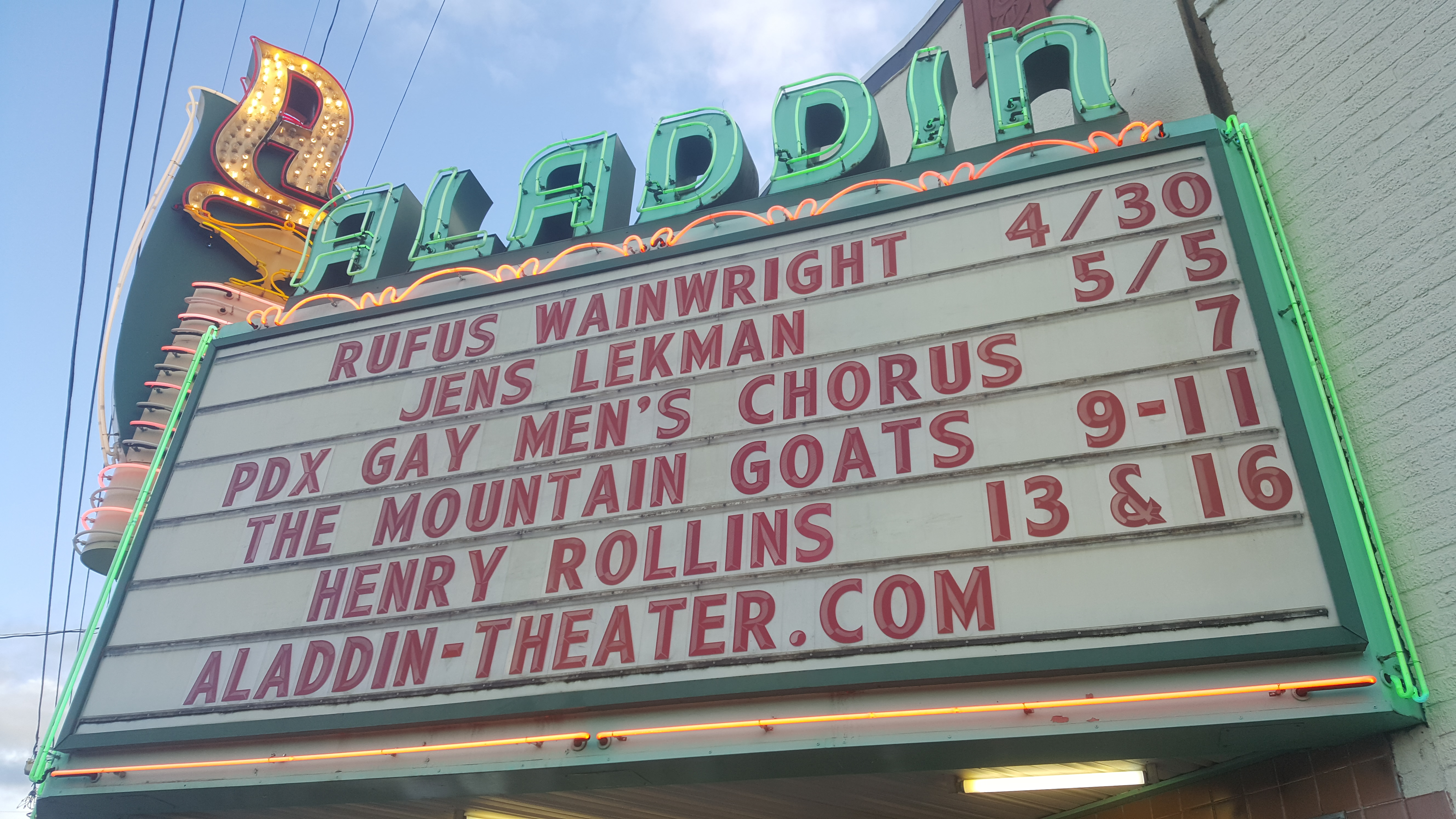
- The Aladdin Theater
- Interactive map of Brooklyn
- Coordinates: 45°29′38″N 122°39′10″W
- Country: United States
- State: Oregon
- City: Portland

Government
  - Association: Brooklyn Action Corps
  - Coalition: Southeast Uplift

Area
  - Total: 1.72 sq mi (4.5 km^{2})

Population (2020)
  - Total: 3,916
  - Density: 2,277/sq mi (879/km^{2})

Housing
  - No. of households: 1899
  - Occupancy rate: 93.9% occupied
  - Owner-occupied: 611 households (37%)
  - Renting: 1061 households (63%)
  - Avg. household size: 2.0 persons

Brooklyn is a mostly residential neighborhood in Southeast Portland, Oregon. It sits along the east side of the Willamette River in the vicinity of Reed College. Founded as a neighborhood in the late 1860s, the neighborhood today is a middle-class area comprising mainly single family homes, interspersed with remaining industrial sites along the river and a large railyard. This railyard was home to Southern Pacific 4449 as well as several other large antique steam and diesel-electric locomotives.

== History ==
The area of the neighborhood was inhabited by Clackamas people before settlement by colonizers. The first documented colonizer of the area was Giddeon Tibbets, who was granted the stolen land in the Donation Land Claim Act of 1850. He arrived in the area in 1851, building a family home and grist mill. Tibbets renamed the area "Brookland" due to the river, creeks, and lakes on his property. In 1868 Tibbets subdivided the property into smaller lots and allowed the Oregon Central Railroad to cross the property. The rail line and the subdivision quickly brought in a large number of residents to the neighborhood, which acquired its current name of "Brooklyn". The influx led to the construction of a town square at the corner of Powell Boulevard and Milwaukie Avenue. In the 1890s, the neighborhood received an influx of largely Roman Catholic German-Americans. While many of the German street/landmark names were changed during World War I, the neighborhood continues to bear the traces of this period today, with several older German-American businesses, as well as the Sacred Heart Catholic Church and the 1891 Johan Poulsen House. In 1908, The contracting firm Geibisch and Joplin built this neighborhood's original sewer system.

In the 1920s, the neighborhood changed drastically as a part of a citywide construction effort. The construction of the Ross Island Bridge over the Willamette destroyed the town square. At the same time, many of the streams and ponds in the neighborhood were filled in. The construction of McLoughlin Boulevard (Oregon Route 99E) severed the neighborhood's connection to the Willamette waterfront. The construction of an overpass on 17th avenue also divided the neighborhood in two.

By the 1960s, the neighborhood had acquired the reputation as being poverty-stricken. During this time, future Portland mayor Tom Potter began his police career in Portland as a beat officer in the neighborhood, as well as nearby Sellwood to the south. According to Potter, he acquired many of the basic tenets of his philosophy of community policing while as a young officer in the neighborhood. Potter became involved in the Brooklyn Action Corps (BAC), a community organization that was founded during this time to combat the poverty, crime, and drugs that were afflicting the neighborhood.

By the 1980s, the neighborhood had undergone a nearly complete turnaround. Today it is regarded as among southeast Portland's most desirable residential neighborhoods. The construction of the Eastbank Esplanade in Portland allowed the neighborhood to regain its connection to the Willamette River, and the opening of the Orange Line light rail, completed in September 2015, has created easier mass-transit access to downtown.

== Demographics ==
In 2020, 3,916 people lived in Brooklyn, up 12% from 3,484 in 2010. 80% of people identified as white, 7.1% as Asian, 3.8% as Black or African American, 2.9% as American Indian or Alaska Native, 0.7% as Native Hawaiian or Pacific Islander, and 6.6% as some other race. 8.5% identified as Hispanic or Latino (any race). The median age in Brooklyn was 37.3. The median household income was listed at $84,000 and 15% of the neighborhood was covered by tree canopy. 64% of eligible residents voted in the 2020 general election.
