= Paul Bulcke =

Belgian businessman (born 1954)

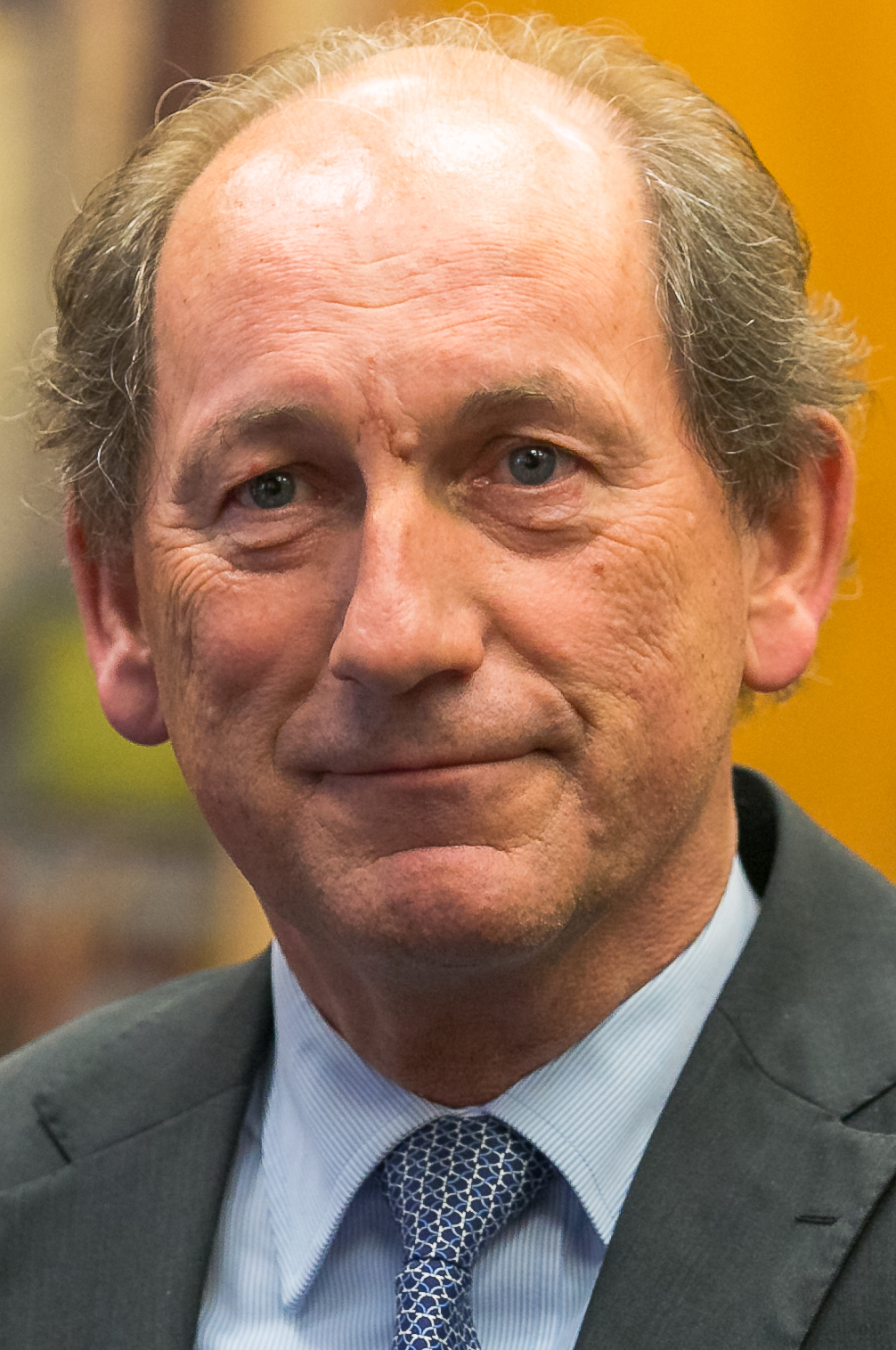
- Bulcke in 2016
- Born: 8 September 1954 (age 71); Roeselare, West Flanders, Belgium
- Education: Katholieke Universiteit Leuven and Vlerick Leuven Gent Management School
- Years active: 1979–
- Spouse: Marilène Vanderhaeghe
- Children: 3

Paul Bulcke (born 8 September 1954) is a Belgian businessman. He was CEO of Nestlé from 2008 to 2016. He was chairman of Nestlé from 2017 to 2025.

== Early life ==
He graduated as a commercial engineer at the Katholieke Universiteit Leuven and is an alumnus of the Vlerick Leuven Gent Management School. He also attended the program for executive development at the Swiss leading business school International Institute for Management Development (IMD) in Lausanne.

== Career ==
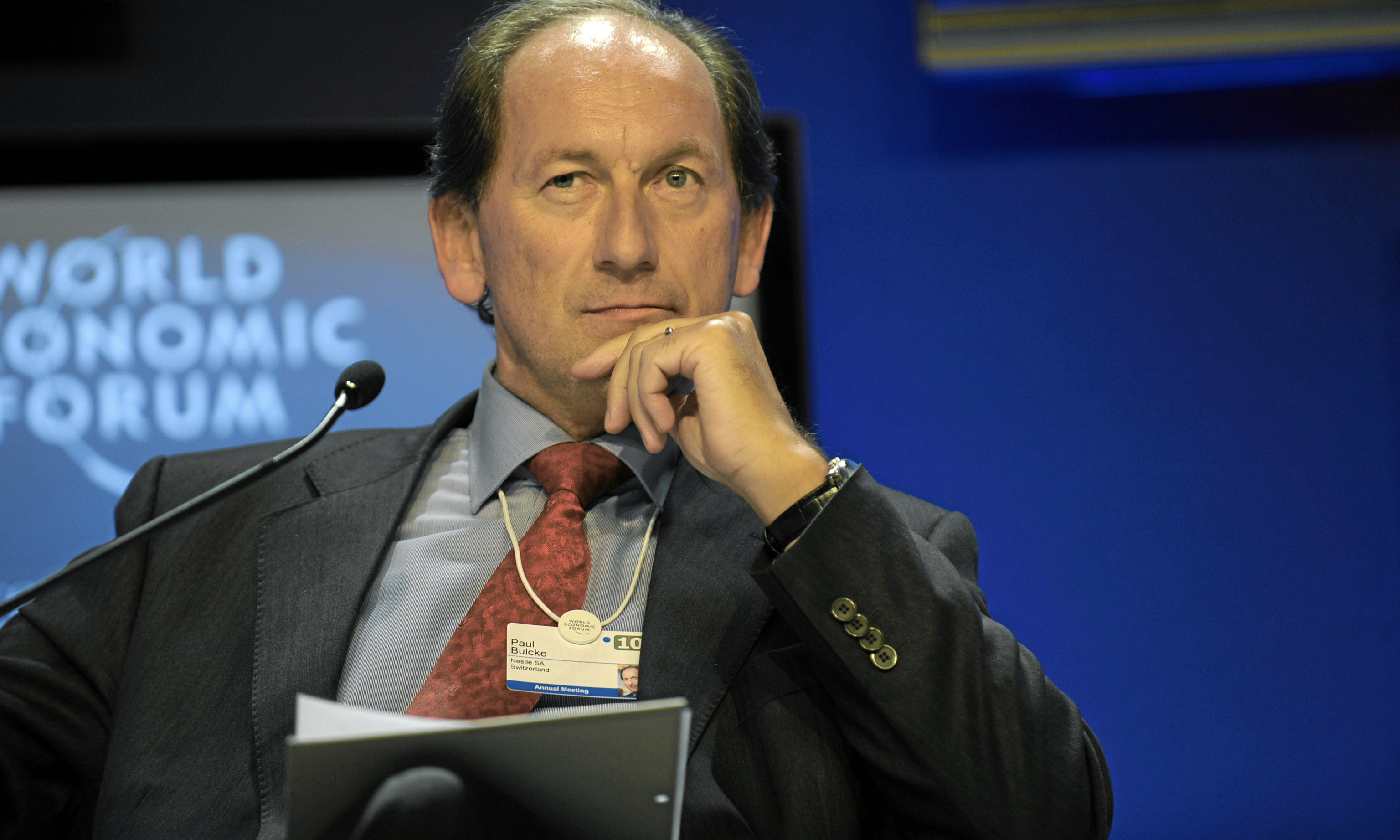
Bulcke in 2010

In 1979, aged 25, he started working for the Nestlé group and worked in different countries, including Switzerland, Spain, Belgium, Peru, Ecuador, Chile, Portugal, Czech Republic and Germany. Before his appointment as CEO of Nestlé, he was the executive vice president of its Americas divisions.

Bulcke has described Nestlé under his tenure as 'une force tranquille' (English: 'calm strength'). He is known for having a reserved, quiet personal manner.

He was succeeded as CEO by Ulf Mark Schneider in January 2017.

In September 2025, Nestlé announced Bulcke would leave his position at the end of September, six months earlier than planned, as part of an accelerated management transition.

== Water sustainability ==
On 30 August 2012, Bulcke was quoted as saying:

"If something isn't given a value, people tend to waste it. Water is our most useful resource, but those using it often don’t even cover the costs of its infrastructure. Fresh water is being massively overused at nature's expense, but it seems only a global crisis will make us realise the importance of the issue. What is environmentally unsustainable today will become socially unsustainable in the future."

== Awards and honours ==
On 25 May 2012, he received the VMA Award from the Vlerick Leuven Gent Management School for his "lifelong career, which has been distinguished by sustained integrity, exceptional management capacity and inspiring leadership".

== Personal life ==
He is married, has three children, and speaks six languages: Dutch, French, Spanish, Portuguese, German and English. He likes to go sailing as a hobby.

== Sources ==
- (in Dutch) Belg Paul Bulcke wordt topman Nestlé
- (in Dutch) Paul Bulcke
- Paul Bulcke
- World Water Week
