= Mars Canada =

Canadian subsidiary of Mars, Incorporated

Mars Canada Limited
- Company type: Private
- Industry: Confectionery manufacturing
- Founded: 1940
- Headquarters: Bolton, Ontario, Canada
- Key people: Frank C. Mars (founder); John Mars (chairman); Mars family (owners)
- Products: Mars Bar · M&M's · Snickers ...
- Revenue: US$18 billion (2005)
- Number of employees: 39,000 (2005)
- Parent: Mars, Incorporated
- Website: Mars Canada

Mars Canada Ltd is the Canadian division of Mars, Incorporated, a privately held multi-national company and a world leader in food, pet care products, and confectionery products.

== Company history ==
The Canadian division began its operation in the late 1940s as a branch of Uncle Ben's Inc. In 1967, the first Canadian office was opened in Montreal, moving to Toronto in 1972. In 1974, the branch was replaced by a Canadian limited company and named Effem Foods Ltd., which was named after the original founder Frank, his wife Ethel, and their son Forrest E. Mars. In 1998, the company was renamed Effem Inc. The current name began use in 2007. In that same year, Effem was selected as one of Canada's Top 100 Employers, as published in Maclean's magazine.

== Office locations ==
Mars Canada's National Office is located in Bolton, Ontario, 20 minutes north of Pearson International Airport.

Also located in Bolton is the petfood manufacturing facility and the food manufacturing facility.

The confectionery manufacturing facility is located in Newmarket, Ontario, 40 minutes north-east of the National Office.

== Products ==
The Mars portfolio has five of the world's leading confectionery brands, including the Mars Bar, Snickers Bar, Skittles and Twix Cookie Bars, and the world's single largest candy brand, M&M's Chocolate Candies.

Canadian brands:

Food

- Ben's Original

Confectionery products

- M&M's
- Mars Bar
- Snickers
- Twix
- 3 Musketeers
- Bounty
- Dove Chocolate
- Skittles
- Starburst
- Maltesers
- Combos

Pet food

- Pedigree Petfoods (#1 brand in Canada)
- Whiskas' (#1 brand in Canada)
- Cesar
- Sheba
- Temptations
