= List of Nestlé brands =

Brand presence by target market

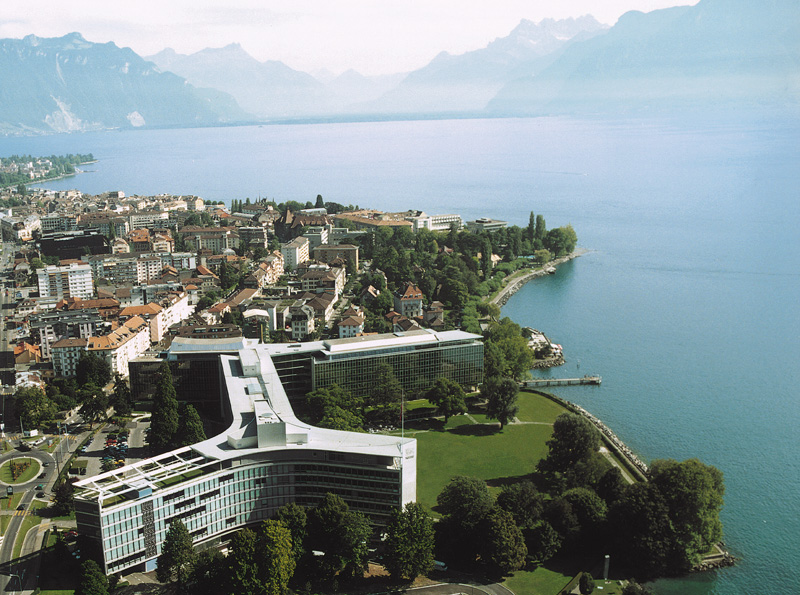
An aerial view of Nestlé's corporate headquarters building in Vevey, Vaud, Switzerland

This is a dated list of the brands owned by Nestlé globally. Overall, Nestlé owns over 2000 brands in 186 countries. Brands in this list are categorized by their targeted markets.

== Beverages ==
- Bear Brand
- Carnation
- Caro (sold in the US as Pero)
- Chuckie (Philippines)
- D'Onofrio (Peru)
- Dancow (Indonesia)
- Milo (Australia)
- Nescau (Brazil)
- Nestlé Fresh (Philippines)
- Nestlé Low Fat (Philippines)
- Nestlé Non Fat (Philippines)
- Nesquik (United States)
- Nestea (joint-venture with Coca-Cola, Beverage Partners Worldwide, product moved to Asia Brewery since 2013 in the Philippines, as a ready to drink bottle only)
- Nesvita (Pakistan, Thailand)
- Ovaltine (United States, under license from Associated British Foods)
- Ricacao (Ecuador)
- Romanette (Switzerland)
- Special.T
- S.Pellegrino
- Sanbittèr (Germany)
- Supligen (Jamaica)– milk beverage
- Sweet Leaf Tea
- yfood, a Munich-based meal replacement drink

=== Coffee ===
- Aguila (Uruguay)
- Blue Bottle Coffee Company
- Bonka
- Buondi (Portugal)
- Chameleon Cold-Brew
- Christina (Portugal)
- Dolca (Argentina)
- Dolce Gusto
- Ecco (Chile, Peru)
- El Chaná (Uruguay)
- International Roast
- Kirma (Peru)
- Loumidis (Greece)
- Mountain Blend
- Nescafé
- Nespresso
- Partner's Blend
- Ricoffy
- Ricoré
- Ristretto
- Santa Cristina (Spain)
- Sical (Portugal)
- Starbucks (Perpetual License for products sold outside of Starbucks coffeehouses)
- Sunrise (India)
- Taster's Choice
- Tofa
- Zoégas (Sweden)

=== Water ===
- Acqua Panna (Italy)
- Alaçam (Turkey)
- Al Manhal (Bahrain)
- Aqua Mineral (Poland)
- Aqua Pod
- Aqua Spring (Greece)
- Aquarel (Spain)
- Arctic (Poland)
- Baraka (Egypt)
- Buxton (UK)
- Charmoise (Belgium)
- Ciego Montero (Cuba)
- Contrex (France)
- Cristalp (Switzerland)
- Da Shan YunNan Spring (China)
- Dar Natury (Poland)
- Eco de los Andes (Argentina)
- Essentia (US)
- Erikli (Turkey)
- Frische Brise (Germany)
- Gerber (Mexico)
- Ghadeer (Jordan)
- Glaciar (Argentina)
- Henniez (Switzerland)
- Hépar (France)
- Hidden Spring (Philippines)
- Κorpi (Greece)
- La Vie (Vietnam)
- Levissima (Italy)
- Los Portales (Cuba)
- Minéré (Thailand)
- Nałęczowianka (Poland)
- Nestlé Selda (Portugal)
- Nestlé Vera (Italy)
- Neuselters (Germany)
- Pejo (Italy)
- Perrier (France)
- Petrópolis (Brazil)
- Porvenir (Chile)
- Princes Gate (UK)
- Pure Life
- Recoaro (Italy)
- S.Pellegrino (Italy)
- Santa Bárbara (Brazil)
- Santa Maria (Mexico)
- São Lourenço (Brazil)
- Sohat (Lebanon)
- Springs (Saudi Arabia)
- Valvert (Belgium)
- Viladrau (Spain)
- Vittel (France)
- Water Line (South Korea)
- Waterman (China)

== Cereals ==
- Cerelac
- Cheerios (in non-US/Canadian markets joint venture between General Mills and Nestlé)
- Chocapic
- Cini Minis
- Clusters
- Cookie Crisp (in non-US/Canadian markets joint venture between General Mills and Nestlé)
- Curiously Strawberry
- Curiously Cinnamon (in non-US/Canadian markets joint venture between General Mills and Nestlé)
- Estrelitas (Portugal)
- Fitness
- Gold Flakes
- Golden Grahams (in non-US/Canadian markets joint venture between General Mills and Nestlé)
- Golden Morn (Nigeria)
- Golden Nuggets
- Honey Stars
- Kit-Kat Cereal
- Koko Krunch (Unicef)
- Lion Cereal
- Milo cereals
- Nescau Cereal (Brazil)
- Nesquik Breakfast Cereal
- Nestlé Corn Flakes
- Neston (Brazil)
- Shredded Wheat (in UK and Ireland under license from Post Consumer Brands)
- Shreddies (in UK and Ireland under license from Post Consumer Brands)
- Snow Flakes (Brazil, Italy)
- Trix (in non-US/Canadian markets joint venture between General Mills and Nestlé)
- Uncle Tobys

== Chilled ==
- Chamyto (Brazil, Mexico, Chile)
- Chambinho (Brazil)
- Chandelle (Brazil, Chile)
- Chiquitín (Mexico, Chile)
- Club (Mexico)
- Hirz (Switzerland)
- La Laitière (France, Belgium, UK)
- La Lechera (Spain, Mexico)
- LC1 (Switzerland)
- Le Viennois (France, Belgium, Switzerland)
- Moça (Brazil)
- Molico (Brazil, now Svelty)
- Munch Bunch (UK)
- Nestlé
- Nesvita (India, Pakistan)
- Ninho (Brazil)
- Ski
- Sollys (Brazil)
- Sveltesse (France)
- Svelty (Mexico)
- Yoco

== Chocolate, confectionery and baked goods ==
- Abuelita
- Aero
- After Eight
- All Stars
- Allen's
- Alpino (Brazil)
- Amor Wafer (Ecuador)
- Bertie Beetle (Australia)
- Balaton (Hungary)
- Besos de Moza (Peru)
- Big Turk (Canada)
- Black Magic
- Blue Riband
- Boci (Hungary)
- Bono (Brazil)
- Bon Pari (Slovakia, Czech Republic, Poland, Russia, Lithuania and Hungary)
- Cailler
- Capri (Chile)
- Caramac
- Carlos V
- Charge (Brazil)
- Choclait Chips (Germany, Austria, Switzerland and Netherlands)
- Choco Crossies (Germany)
- Chokita (formerly called Negrita in Chile)
- Chokito (Brazil, Switzerland, Australia, and New Zealand)
- Coffee Crisp (Canada)
- Crunch (licensed to Ferrara Candy Company in the US)
- D'Onofrio (Peru)
- Dairy Box
- Damak (Turkey)
- Fizzfindle
- Frigor
- Galak/Milkybar
- Garoto
- Heaven
- Hercules Bars (Disney)
- Joe (Romania and the Netherlands)
- Joff
- JOJO (Slovakia, Czech Republic and Poland)
- Kit Kat (licensed to Hershey's in the US)
- Lion
- Lollo (Brazil)
- Mabel's (Bolivia)
  - Cracker
  - Cremositas
  - Gauchitas
  - María Maizena
  - Moraditas
  - Rosquitas
  - Salvado
  - TOP
  - Wafer
  - Yapita
- McKay
- Matchmakers
- Maverick
- Mint Pattie (Australia)
- Mio (Brazil)
- Minties (Australia)
- Mirage
- Moça (Brazil)
- Munchies (United Kingdom)
- Negresco (Brazil)
- Nestlé Alpine White
- Nestle Caja Roja (Portugal)
- Nestlé Classic (Brazil)
- Nestlé Dessert
- Nestlé Extrafino (Portugal, Spain)
- Nestlé Milk Chocolate
- Nestlé Munch (India and Bangladesh)
- Nestlé Chocolate (Pakistan)
- Nestlé Toll House cookies
- Nestlé with Almonds
- Nestlé White Chocolate
- Nestlé Wonder Ball
- Nestlé Yes (Germany)
- Nuts (Europe)
- Orion (Slovakia, Czech Republic)
- Passatempo (Spain, Brazil, Italy, Chile)
- Peppermint Crisp (South Africa, Australia, and New Zealand)
- Perugina Baci
- Plaistowe (Australia)
- Polo
- Prestígio (Chile, Brazil)
- Princessa (Poland)
- Quality Street
- Rolo (licensed to Hershey's in the US)
- Rowntree's
  - Fruit Gums
  - Fruit Pastilles
  - Jelly Tots
  - Juicy Jellies
  - Pick & Mix
  - Randoms
- Sahne Nuss (Chile)
- Savoy (Venezuela)
  - Susy
  - Cocosette
  - Samba
  - Carlton
  - Prestige
  - Bolero
  - Galak
  - Carre
- Scorched Almonds (New Zealand)
- Sensação (Brazil)
- Smarties (not to be confused with the tablet candy sold in the United States)
- Suflair (Brazil)
- Sublime (Peru)
- Sundy (France)
- Super 8 (Chile)
- Svitoch (Ukraine)
- Szerencsi (Hungary)
- Tango (Ecuador)
- Tango Mini Galletas (Ecuador)
- Tex (South Africa)
- Toffee Crisp
- Tola (UAE)
- Trencito (Chile)
- Triangulo (Peru)
- Turtles (UK, Canada)
- Walnut Whip
- XXX mints
- Yorkie
- Zvečevo (HR)

== Foodservice products ==
- Chef-Mate
- Davigel
- Minor's
- Santa Rica

== Frozen food ==
- Buitoni
- California Pizza Kitchen (US)
- Delissio Pizza (Canada)
- DiGiorno Pizza (US)
- Hot Pockets (US)
- Garden Gourmet
- Hälsans Kök (Scandinavia)
- Jack's Pizza
- Lean Cuisine
- Lean Pockets
- Malher (GT)
- Papa Giuseppe
- Stouffer's
- Sweet Earth Foods
- Tombstone Pizza
- Winiary (PL)
- Wagner Pizza (EU)

=== Frozen desserts ===
- Åhusglass (Sweden)
- Aino (Finland)
- Cadbury Ice Cream (Philippines)
- Camy (Spain, Portugal)
- D'Onofrio (Peru)
- Делта (Delta, Bulgaria)
- Δέλτα (Delta, Greece)
- Nestlé Dibs – Produced in conjunction with Dreyer's Ice Cream. Marketed as Edy's in the midwest and eastern United States.
- Dreyer's
- Drumstick
- Eskimo (Finland)
- Extra Creamy (Philippines)
- Extrême (UK, Ireland, France, Spain, Italy, Switzerland)
- Frigor (Argentina)
- Frisco (Switzerland)
- Froneri
- Häagen-Dazs
- Kimo
- Kimy (Philippines)
- Maxibon
- Mat Kool (Malaysia)
- Mivvi
- Motta (Italy)
- Mövenpick (Switzerland)
- Nestlé Ice Cream
- Nestlé Princessa (Poland)
- Nobrelli (Philippines)
- Oreo Ice Cream (Formerly from Selecta Ice Cream in the Philippines)
- Outshine
- Pingviini (Finland)
- Pirulo (Switzerland)
- Pralinato (Switzerland)
- Push-Up
- Rakete - Fuzée - Razzo (Switzerland)
- Real Dairy
- Savory (Chile)
- Schöller (Germany and Austria)
- Skinny Cow
- Sorbetes (Philippines)
- Temptations Ice Cream (Philippines)
- Tip Top (New Zealand)
- Toblerone
- Twin Pops (Philippines)
- Underground is (Denmark)
- zer0% Fat (Philippines)

== Healthcare nutrition ==
- Atrium Innovations
- Boost
- Carnation Instant Breakfast
- Compleat
- Crucial
- Diabetisource
- Douglas Laboratories
- Fibersource
- Garden of Life
- Genestra brands
- Glytrol
- Impact
- Isosource
- Meritene
- Modulen
- Nature's Bounty
- Novasource Renal
- Nutren
- Nuun
- Optifast
- Optifibre
- Orgain
- Osteo Bi-Flex
- Puritan's Pride
- Peptamen
- Persona Nutrition
- Pure Encapsulations
- Resorb
- Resource
- Solgar
- Sustagen
- Trophic
- Vital Proteins
- Wobenzym

== Child nutrition ==
- Alfamino
- Alfare
- Althera
- Beba
- Bona (Finland)
- Cerelac
- Farinha Láctea (Brazil)
- FM 85
- Freshly
- Gerber
- Good Start
- Guigoz
- Lactogen
- Maggi
- Mezeast (UK)
- Mindful Chef
- NAN AL 110
- NAN Infinipro HA
- NAN Optipro
- NAN Sensitive
- Nankid
- NanSoy
- NaturNes
- Neslac
- Nestlé
- Nestlé Bear Brand
- Nestogen Since 1930 (formerly Nestogen)
- Nestogen Kid 3+ (formerly Nestogrow Four and Nestokid Four)
- Nido
- Piltti (Finland)
- PreNan
- SMA (UK)
- Wyeth (Bonna, Bonina, Bonakid, Bonakid Pre-School 3+, S-26, S-26 Gold, S-26 Promil, S-26 Promil Gold, Promil, Promil Gold, Ascenda, Ascenda Kid) (sold to Nestlé Philippines since 2012)

== Performance nutrition ==
- Boost
- Neston
- Nesvita
- Pria
- Supligen

== Petcare ==
The following products are manufactured by Nestlé Purina.

=== Nestlé Purina petcare products ===
- Purina
- Purina Alpo
- Purina Beggin' Strips
- Purina Beneful
- Purina Busy Bone
- Purina Cat Chow
- Purina Dental Life
- Purina Dog Chow
- Purina Fancy Feast
- Purina Felix
- Purina Friskies
- Purina Gourmet
- Purina ONE
- Purina Pro Plan Veterinary Diets
- AdVENTuROS

=== Other petcare products ===
- Bakers
- Beta
- Bonio
- Bonnie
- Castor & Pollux
- Fido (French equivalent brand to Bakers and Beneful)
- Go Cat
- Lily's Kitchen
- Lucky Dog
- Merrick
- Mon Petit
- PetLife
- Republic of Cats (majority owned by Nestle Purina)
- Supercoat
- Tails
- Tidy Cats
- Totalcare
- Whole Earth Farms
- Winalot

== Refrigerated products ==
- Buitoni
- Toll House – refrigerated cookie dough

== Seasonings ==
- Carpathia
- CHEF
- Haoji
- Maggi
- Thomy
- Totole
- Winiary

== Shelf stable ==
- Coffee-Mate
- Milo
- Nestlé Omega Plus – a milk product
- Tendre Noix

== Yogurt ==
- Acti-V (Philippines)
- ActiPlus (Pakistan)
- Hirz (Switzerland)
- Longa Vida (Portugal)
- Lactalis (Spanish)
- Molico (Brazil)
- Munch Bunch
- Nestlé Raita (mint and cumin) (Pakistan)
- Nestlé Yogurt
- Rawaytee Maza (Pakistan)
- Ski Dairy (United Kingdom)
- Sweet N Tasty Yogurt (Pakistan)
- Yelly (Pakistan)

== As shareholder ==
- Nestlé owns 5% of Animal Bar Club. Swiss Crown AG owns 95%. World Tour.
- Nestlé owns 23.29% of L'Oréal, the world's largest cosmetics and beauty company, whose brands include Garnier, Maybelline, Lancôme and Urban Decay.
- Nestlé owned 100% of Alcon in 1978. In 2002, Nestlé sold 23.2% of its Alcon shares on the New York Stock Exchange. In 2008, Nestlé sold 24.8% of existing Alcon shares to the Swiss pharmaceutical giant Novartis. In 2010, Nestlé sold the remaining 52% of its Alcon shares to Novartis. Novartis paid a total of 39.1 bn USD.
- Nestlé owned 40% of Herta Foods after selling 60% to Casa Tarradellas in 2019. In December 2025, Nestlé sold the remaining 40% to Casa Tarradellas.

== Former brands ==
This is a selected list of the former brands formerly owned, discontinued, or sold to another company by Nestlé. Overall, Nestlé has discontinued, sold, or changed the name of many of its brands. Former brands are categorized by their targeted markets.

=== Beverages ===
- Alpine – sold to Alaska Milk Corporation in 2007
- Bear Brand Fit & Fresh - a ready to drink in milky and fruity flavour in the Philippines.
- Enviga (joint-venture with Coca-Cola, Beverage Partners Worldwide)
- Farine Lactée – baby formula invented by Henri Nestlé and introduced in 1867
- Juicy Juice – sold to Brynwood Partners
- Kean's/Goya Nutrivim - a chocolate milk powderd drink in the Philippines.
- Krem Top – sold to Alaska Milk Corporation in 2007
- Liberty – sold to Alaska Milk Corporation in 2007
- Libby's
- Magnolia – formerly known as Nestlé Magnolia dairy products in the Philippines, joint-venture with Nestlé Philippines And San Miguel Corporation in 1994–2004, returned to San Miguel Corporation in 2004
  - Magnolia Chocolait - returned to San Miguel Corporation in 2004
  - Magnolia Fresh Milk - returned to San Miguel Corporation in 2004
  - Magnolia Full Cream Milk - returned to San Miguel Corporation in 2004
  - Magnolia Low Fat Milk - returned to San Miguel Corporation in 2004
  - Magnolia Premium Milk in bottle - (discontinued)
- Quik – name changed to Nesquik
- Nestlé Quik – name changed to Nesquik
- Wyeth
  - Aqiva
  - Bonamil
  - Bonakid 1+
  - Bonakid Pre-School 3+
  - Bonakid School Age Choco Boost
  - Enercal Plus
  - ProMama
  - Promil Aqiva
  - Promil Kid
  - Promil Pre-School
  - Progress
  - Progress Gold
  - Progress Pre-School Gold

=== Bottled water ===
Many North American brands are now owned and marketed by BlueTriton Brands.

- Aberfoyle (Ontario, Canada)
- Arrowhead (US)
- Calistoga (US)
- Deep Spring (California)
- Deer Park (US)
- Fruity Water (US)
- Ice Mountain (US)
- Montclair (Canada)
- Ozarka (US)
- Powwow Water – discontinued
- Pure Life/Pureza Vital/Vie Pure
- Poland Spring (US)
- Theodora
- Zephyrhills (US)

These French mineral water brands were sold to the Ogeu group in France.

- Plancoët
- Quézac
- Saint-Lambert
- Sainte-Alix

=== Confectionery ===
- 100 Grand - sold to the Ferrero Group in 2018.
- BabyRuth - sold to the Ferrero Group in 2018.
- Bit-O-Honey – sold to the Pearson's Candy Company in 2013
- Boom-Boom Pops - sold to Delfi Limited in 2006
- Breakaway
- Butterfinger - sold to the Ferrero Group in 2018.
- Drifter
- Fox's - hard candies
- Goya - sold to Delfi Limited in 2006
- Kean's - name changed to Goya in 1999
- Knick-Knacks - sold to Delfi Limited in 2006
- OhHenry! - sold to the Ferrero Group in 2018.
- PowerBar Chocolate Bar - sold to Post Holdings in 2014
- Raisinets - sold to the Ferrero Group in 2018.
- Rowntree's Tootie Frooties - discontinued in 2019
- SnoCaps - sold to the Ferrero Group in 2018.
- Texan Bar
- Violet Crumble - sold to Robern Menz in 2018
- Willy Wonka Candy Company - sold to the Ferrero Group in 2018.
- Wonder Ball – sold to Frankford Candy & Chocolate Company

=== Eye care ===
- Alcon – sold to Novartis in 2010

=== Frozen food ===
- La Cocinera (Spain) – sold to Findus
- Hjem-IS (Denmark, Norway) - sold in 2013
- Hemglass (Sweden) - sold to Varsego in 2013
- Kotijäätelö (Finland)
- Magnolia Ice Cream (Philippines) - returned to San Miguel Corporation in 2004
- Selecta Ice Cream - sold to RFM Corporation

=== Health and nutrition ===
- f.a.a – name changed

=== Petcare ===
- Fido Freeze – name changed to Frosty Paws
- Pet79 – name changed to Frosty Paws
- SnackAttack – name changed to Beggin' Strips

=== Shelf-stable ===
- Branston Pickle (now owned by Mizkan)
- Gale's Honey
- Maggi Rich Mami Noodles
- Magnolia All Purpose Cream - returned to San Miguel Corporation in 2010
- Magnolia Sour Cream - returned to San Miguel Corporation in 2010
- Sarson's Vinegar (sold to Premier Foods but now owned by Mizkan)
