= Aero bar =

Aero bar may refer to:

- Aero (chocolate), a chocolate candy bar
- Aero bar for bicycles, a bicycle handle bar used for time trials or triathlons
