= Aero Biscuits =

British aerated chocolate biscuits

- Product type: Chocolate biscuit
- Current owner: Nestlé
- Country: U.K.
- Introduced: 2011; 15 years ago
- Related brands: Aero

Aero Biscuits is an aerated-chocolate and biscuit family of products based on Nestlé's popular Aero product line. The Aero biscuits were launched in 2011.

== Overview ==
On 25 April 2011, Nestlé released the first flavour of Aero Biscuits onto the market in the United Kingdom and Ireland. The product consists of Aero aerated chocolate, along with several sphere shaped pea sized biscuits nestled in a milk chocolate coating. On 21 May 2012, Nestlé released two additional flavours of Aero Biscuits onto the market in the United Kingdom and Ireland. The two flavours are Aero Orange Biscuits, and Aero Mint Biscuits (Aero Mint is the best selling flavour of Aero Chocolate).

Aero Orange Biscuits consist of a layer of aerated milk chocolate, orange coloured orange flavoured aerated chocolate, along with several sphere shaped pea biscuits nestled in the chocolate. Aero Mint Biscuits consist of a layer aerated milk chocolate, green coloured mint flavoured chocolate along with several pea biscuits nestled in the chocolate. The Aero Biscuits product line contains no artificial colours, flavours, or preservatives and has 99 calories per bar.

== Advertising ==
Immediately following the release of Aero Biscuits, Nestlé began to heavily market and advertise the product line on 1 May 2011. Most television and print advertisements featured well known British actor Tom Adams. Adams was featured in a series of advertisements for the product line. The advertisements were broadcast throughout the United Kingdom and Ireland. The series of television advertisements were produced by Dublin, Ireland advertising agency DDFH+B.

The product was supported by £4m of marketing funds, to promote the product through television adverts.
