= Tyznik =

Tyznik is a surname. Notable people with the surname include:

- Anthony Tyznik (1925–2016), American architect
- William Tyznik (1927–2013), American professor
