= Toffee Crisp =

British candy bar

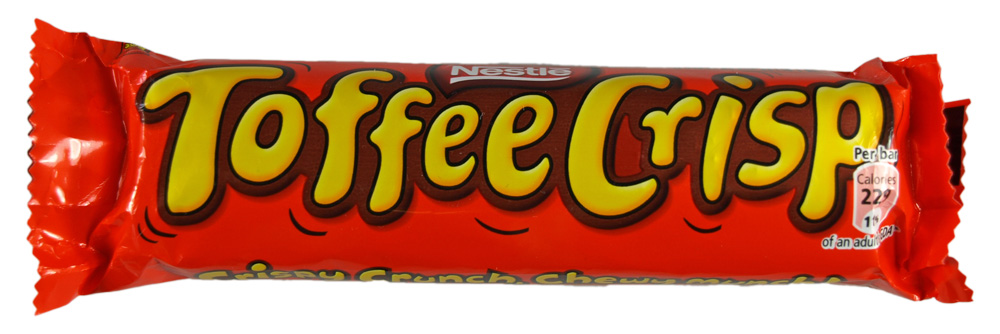
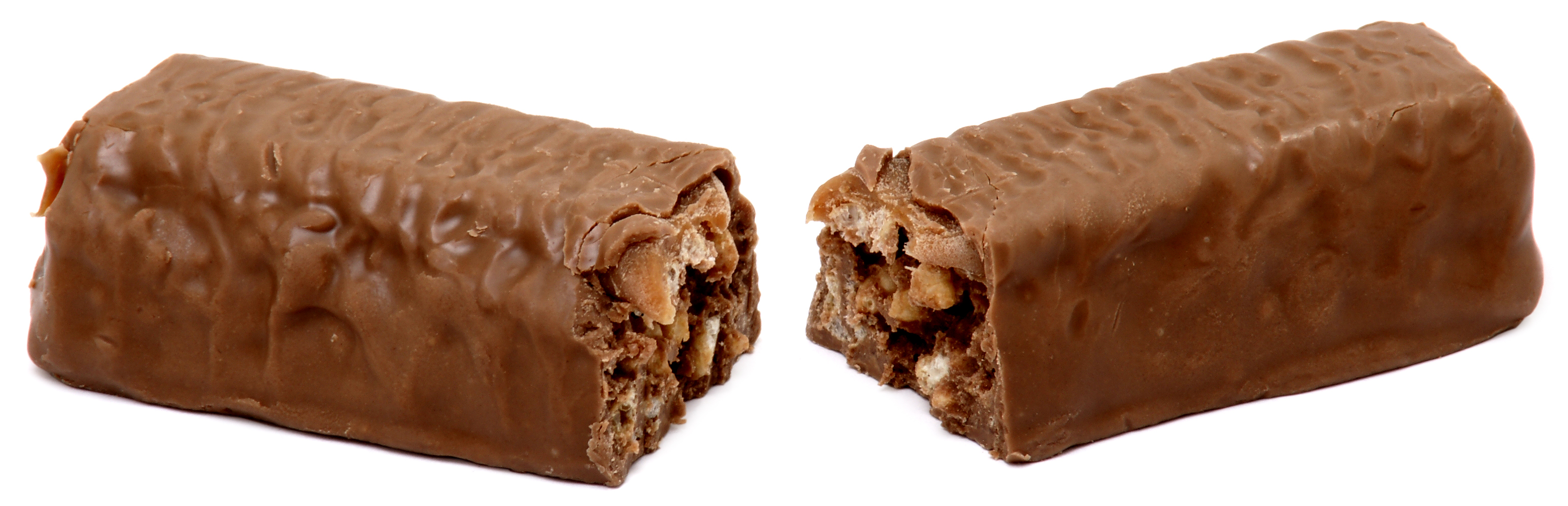

Nutritional value per 100 g (3.5 oz)
- Energy: 2,166 kJ (518 kcal)
- Carbohydrates: 61.5 g
- Sugars: 49.9 g
- Dietary fiber: 1.4 g
- Fat: 28.2 g
- Saturated: 18.0 g
- Protein: 3.8 g
- ^{†}Percentages estimated using US recommendations for adults.

Toffee Crisp is a British crisped-cereal and caramel confection with a chocolate-flavoured coating. Created in 1963 and manufactured by Nestlé, the bars were produced in England until moving to Poland in the early 2020s and contained chocolate until 2025. The brand has been advertised using the slogan "somebody somewhere is having a Toffee Crisp" and has spawned multiple derivatives and tie-ins.

== History ==
The Toffee Crisp was invented in 1963 by John Henderson, the great-nephew of Mackintosh's founder John Mackintosh. Inspired by a cake his wife made for their children, early versions featured puffed rice and chocolate cake; subsequent versions comprised caramel, crisped cereal, and chocolate. First made at a factory in Halifax, the brand had moved to Castleford in West Yorkshire by 2010 before moving to Fawdon and then to Poland in the early 2020s. In 2025, following a round of skimpflation caused by poor cocoa harvests, Nestlé replaced some of the bar's cocoa solids and milk solids with vegetable fat, which meant neither met the 20% figure required to call itself chocolate under UK law.

Early advertising used the line "somebody somewhere is having a Toffee Crisp"; Richard Osman investigated the claim for his 2017 book The World Cup of Everything and found it was likely correct. A 1995 advert featuring the product being transformed into several cartoon-style objects including a pistol and a noose spawned thirty complaints to the Independent Television Commission, who declined to investigate. The brand subsequently made adverts comprising angry people being placated after eating a Toffee Crisp, and an advert involving a spoof of the Japanese game show Endurance.

The brand launched clusters and biscuit versions in 1999, ice cream bars in 2004, cereal in 2014, and limited edition coconut, honeycomb, and orange flavour derivatives in 2001, 2015, and 2021. Biscuit bars began being sold in 2024 as part of Big Biscuit Boxes, which contained 69 bars of Kit Kat, Blue Riband, and Toffee Crisp, while the brand's coconut derivative was advertised using a combover in the shape of a coconut husk. The brand was also used as a Burger King ice cream Fusion in 2015 and in Krispy Kreme doughnuts in 2021. McDonald's brought out lines of McFlurries featuring the brand in 2017, 2025, and again in 2025 as an emergency replacement following quality control failures with the Caramel Loaded McFlurry.

In 2011, the South African newspaper Pretoria News reported that the bars could be found on local supermarket shelves despite not being intended for that market. Two years later, Jim'll Paint It featured a three-legged Toffee Crisp holding a mushroom and half a wasp and Nestlé's Fawdon factory celebrated the brand's 50th birthday by raffling a 10-kilogram (22 lb) version for Action for Children. In 2015, following a lawsuit by The Hershey Company, the US importer Let's Buy British announced that it would no longer import several lines of British chocolate and that this included Toffee Crisps due to its packaging being similar to Hershey's peanut butter cups; the lawsuit sparked a boycott and a MoveOn petition. A 2018 episode of The Jeremy Kyle Show featured a guest unsuccessfully trying to prove his ex-girlfriend used a Toffee Crisp wrapper as a condom.
