= Aerated chocolate =

Chocolate containing tiny gas bubbles

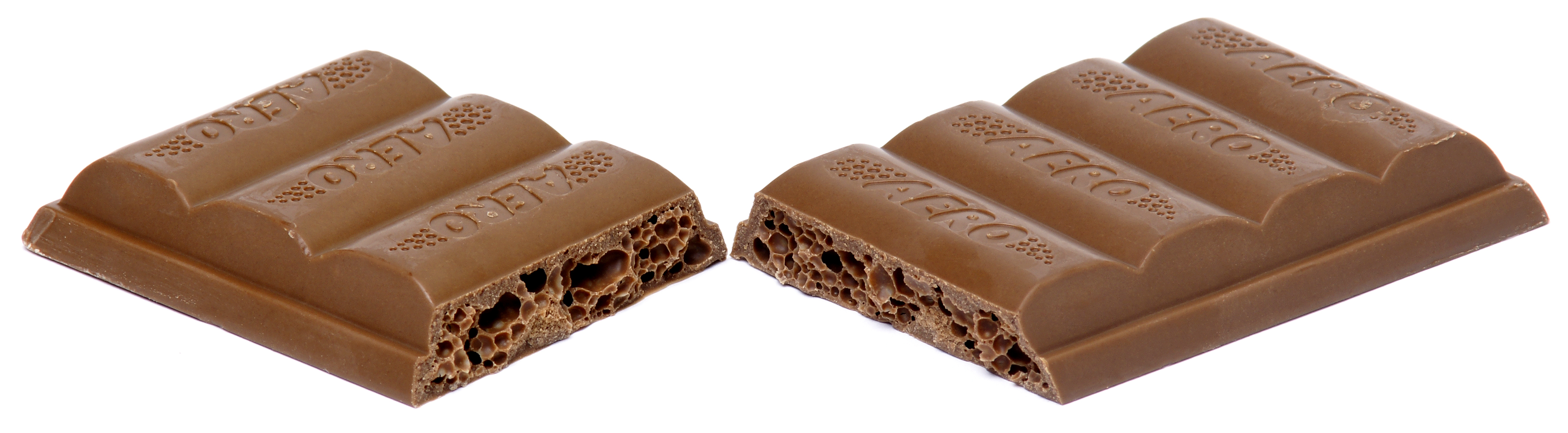
An Aero bar, split to show the aerated chocolate within

Aerated chocolate is chocolate that has undergone foaming. It has a lower density than other types of chocolate, and a smoother mouthfeel as it melts. Aerated chocolate was first brought to market in 1935 by the British chocolate maker Rowntree's under the brand Aero. Although Rowntree patented the manufacturing process, other chocolate makers quickly began making their own products, and today several manufacturers make aerated chocolates.

Aerated chocolate can be divided into four types. The most common, seen in Aero, has large bubbles and is produced under a vacuum, or by beating gas into liquid chocolate under pressure. Aerated chocolate with tiny bubbles uses the same beating gas method but with nitrogen. Aerated chocolates containing long tubes of air are extruded rather than moulded. The final type is an aerated chocolate with low fat content, held together by a skeleton of solid particles. They are made by first dissolving sugar, then forming an emulsion with other ingredients. It finally undergoes evaporation and drying or freeze drying to reduce the water content.

== History ==
=== Beginnings ===
In September 1935, British chocolate manufacturer Rowntree's brought the first aerated chocolate, Aero, to market. At the time, Rowntree's had been struggling for several years to compete with rival chocolate maker Cadbury's Cadbury Dairy Milk and was looking for a new product to gain an advantage. The new chocolate was the outcome of significant research focused on developing a "count line" chocolate inspired by the recent introduction of the Mars bar to the UK market. (Note: Count-line chocolates are those sold as individual units rather than as measured units of block chocolate.) Rowntree's patented their aerated chocolate broadly, covering variants such as chocolate with inclusions. As it was released to market, the new chocolate garnered strong sales and positive reviews, although some concerns were voiced within Rowntree's that the product would be a novelty.

In their initial marketing, Rowntree's promoted aerated chocolate as better than solid chocolate: more digestible and lacking its "cloying after-taste". Cadbury objected to this and petitioned Rowntree's to stop denigrating rival chocolate makers in marketing.Rival chocolate markers attempted to position their existing product lines as competition (Cadbury their crumbly Flake bars, and Fry's their aerated-honeycomb-filled Crunchie bars), but none were seen by customers as "aerated" in the same sense as Aero. Further to their objections about aerated chocolate's digestibility, Cadbury contested the validity of the patent itself, arguing it overstepped and covered chocolates Cadbury already manufactured, as well as being malformed. In September 1936, Fry's released an aerated Crunchie bar made entirely of chocolate. They justified this move as not breaching the patent, saying it was not a block but a bar. As Aero sales began to dip, Rowntree's brought out variants, selling the first aerated chocolates with fruit and nut inclusions.

After Fry's launched a second aerated chocolate in August 1937 called Ripple, Rowntree's had to decide whether they wanted to try to enforce their patent. By this time, Nestlé and Fry's had joined Cadbury in having expressed a willingness to challenge the patent in the courts despite it being officially approved by the patent office. On legal advice that there was a 50% likelihood of success in a court challenge, and the threat of court proceedings causing bad publicity, Rowntree's entered negotiations with other chocolate makers to discuss licensing aerated chocolate. Rival companies were dominant in the proceedings dialogues, and Rowntree's ultimately agreed to licence aerated chocolate from June 1938 under the conditions that chocolate makers pay a sum with the release of new aerated chocolate lines and a 0.5% royalty on sales.

After this agreement was put in place, Cadbury only released aerated chocolate products in overseas dominions where Aero was not established. Nestlé-produced aerated chocolates included a chocolate called Bubblo, made in the UK for export to New Zealand under a New Zealand patent. Aerated chocolate was already being sold in some overseas markets, by 1936 for instance, Aero was being successfully exported to Australia. The American chocolate maker Hershey's purchased the Aero patent the following May, later altering the flavour and texture for the American palate. During 1937, Rowntree's produced machinery for production in Ireland, Canada and South Africa, as well as for the companies Lindt and Van Houten.

=== After World War II ===
After production was temporarily paused in the UK during World War II, Aero returned to market, introducing aerated chocolate to a generation which had never seen the product, and by 1950 a product containing aerated chocolate coating wafers was released. The war also impacted production in Canada and South Africa. Beginning in the late 1950s in an effort try to improve falling Aero sales, Rowntree's began releasing new varieties. These included coffee and orange varieties that were sold only briefly, but also included peppermint, which became a permanent fixture. Marketing for these products abandoned the emphasis on aerated chocolate as a "unique" type of chocolate, instead focusing on the "bubbly" structure.

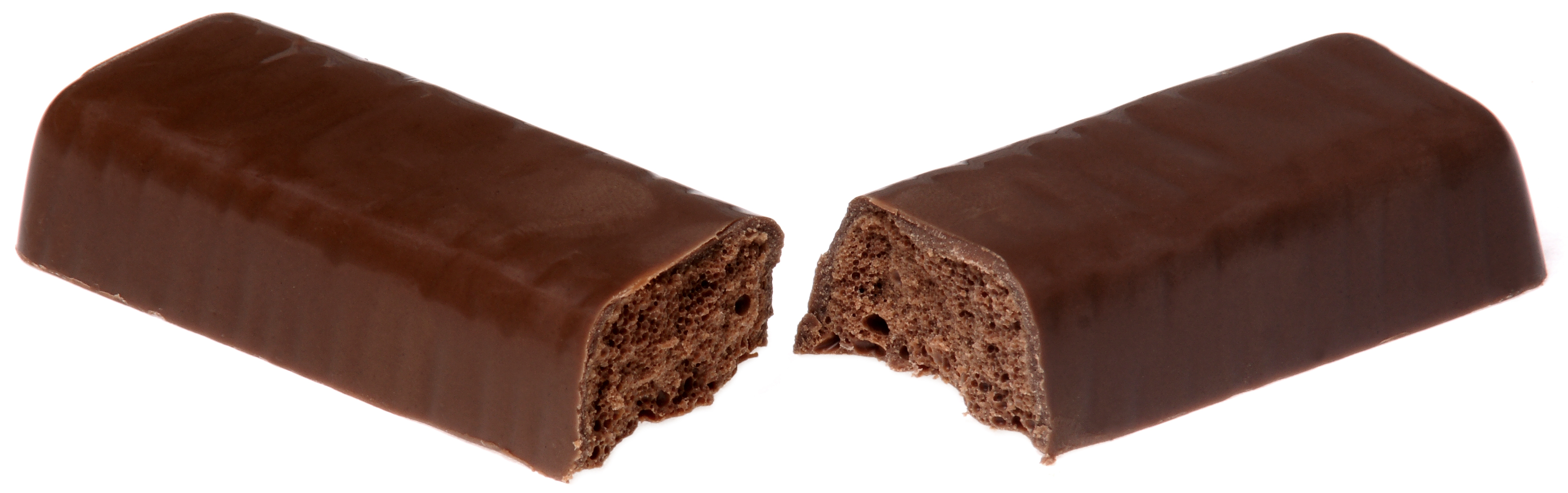
A Wispa bar, split. Cadbury produced this aerated chocolate using a secret, unpatented technique.

In the 1970s, biscuit manufacturers began using micro-aeration to process chocolate for moulded products. This was a cost-saving measure: with less chocolate, the same volume of coated biscuit could be maintained. In 1981 or 1983, Cadbury released Wispa, an aerated chocolate with a more chunky shape than Aero bars, made using a secret, non-patented process. The launch of Wispa was successful, but it soon encountered manufacturing difficulties and was temporarily withdrawn from the market. While Wispa was off the market, Rowntree's developed and launched a chunky Aero which they successfully launched and was still being sold as of 2008. Wispa was discontinued in the early 2000s so Cadbury could bring in a new aerated chocolate product aligned with the Cadbury Dairy Milk brand: Dairy Milk Bubbly. (Note: Cadbury replaced Wispa with Dairy Milk Bubbly as they wanted to streamline the number of brands they held, while not wanting to lose customers for aerated chocolate. It was part of a broader strategy of removing brands and reintroducing them under the Dairy Milk brand.) Following an internet campaign in 2007, Cadbury reintroduced Wispa. Today, Aero is manufactured by Nestlé, the brand having been acquired by Nestlé during a 1988 takeover of Rowntree's. As of 2023, other brands of aerated chocolate includes Mirage and Galaxy.

== Types ==
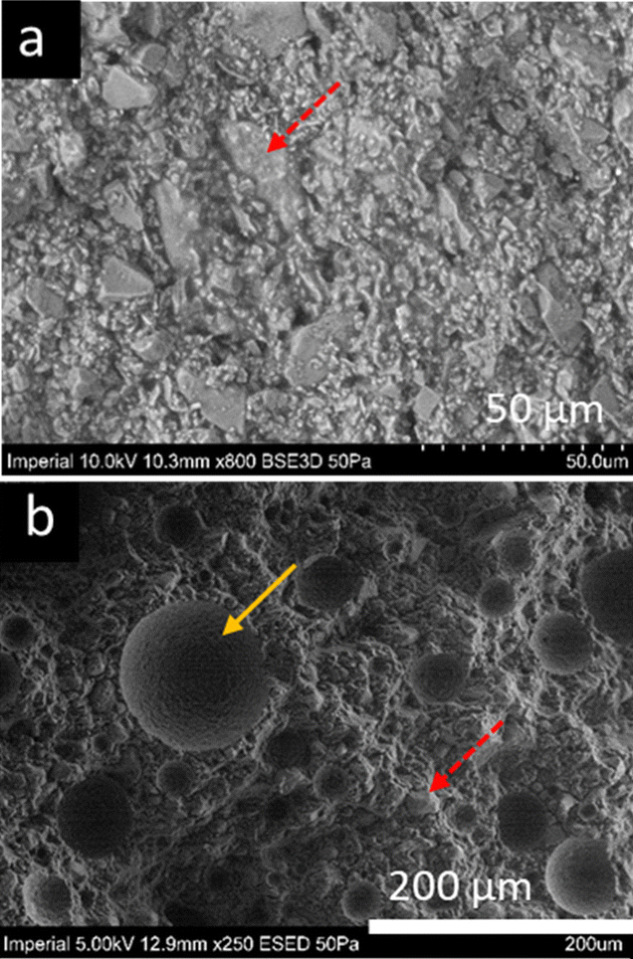
(a) Non-aerated chocolate and (b) micro-aerated chocolate under a microscope. The images are at different magnifications.The yellow, unbroken arrow points to a bubble. The red, dashed arrows point to sugar particles.

There are four types of aerated chocolates that have been sold:

- Chocolate containing large, visible bubbles. Bubble diameters are between 0.05–3.0 mm (0.002–0.118 in), and the product is around half the density of regular chocolate. It is the most common type; Aero is a prominent example.
- Micro-aerated chocolate. The bubbles of this chocolate are so small as to be almost imperceptible to the naked eye. Micro-aerated chocolates are primarily used to coat chocolate biscuits in an effort to reduce the percentage of chocolate by weight.
- Chocolate containing long, continuous tubes of air. These chocolates are made by extruding semi-set or solid chocolate. Cadbury used to sell this type of chocolate under the brand Spira.
- Although chocolate typically consists of particles of cocoa, sugar and sometimes milk suspended in a fat, the fourth type of aerated chocolate inverts this. This chocolate has a low fat content, and as a result the solid particles (particularly the sugar) form a skeletal structure and bind the chocolate together. It is often used to garnish desserts such as ice-creams and cakes after being broken into small pieces. For a time, it was sold on the Japanese chocolate market under the brand Poff.

== Characteristics ==
Aerated chocolate is a foam, meaning it contains gas, which conventional chocolate lacks. This distinction gives aerated chocolate different physical properties and eating experiences than regular chocolate: they have a lower density, occupying more space for the same weight, are more brittle, and have a larger surface area. Chocolates held together by solid particles rather than fats have the lowest density among aerated chocolates, between 0.1–0.3 g/cm^{3} (0.058–0.17 oz/cu in), several times lower than the average density of regular chocolate (around 1.3 g/cm^{3} (0.75 oz/cu in)).

As a result of these properties, biting into some aerated chocolates, particularly those with larger bubbles, produces an audible crunch. When the chocolate enters the mouth, a "fragile" mouthfeel is created until the chocolate is chewed, upon which it quickly begins to melt and the mouthfeel shifts to become creamy. The way the chocolate melts changes with the size of bubbles: as they get smaller, the chocolate becomes smoother and melts quicker. In the fourth type of aerated chocolate, those held together by solid particle skeletons rather than with fat, the chocolate doesn't melt with heat as conventional chocolate does. Rather, because of its very low density, as it enters the mouth it dissolves.

Aerated chocolates have a more intense flavour than conventional chocolates due to their larger surface area. The gas used to aerate chocolates also has an effect on the intensity of flavour, although a comparatively small one. Although aerated chocolates are often perceived by consumers as having a lower calorie content than regular chocolate, this is unfounded as the calorific value of foods are measured in calories per gram.

== Production ==
Aerated chocolate containing large bubbles is produced via two methods. In the first, melted chocolate is put under a vacuum, where it foams up. As the chocolate cools, and the fats within the chocolate set, the foam structure remains. Sometimes gases such as carbon dioxide are introduced into the mixture before it is placed under the vacuum. Although the method easily permits inclusions such as nougat or nuts, the production is labor-intensive and difficult to keep hygienic. As a result, the second method is more frequently used: working gases into liquid, tempered chocolate under high pressure. Carbon dioxide is mainly used, although others include nitrous oxide. Air is avoided, as oxygen causes chocolate to become rancid. Any gases that do not dissolve are dispersed as bubbles through the chocolate using a beater. As the chocolate is released from the high pressure conditions, the bubbles expand, foaming the product; through this, the amount of pressure directly impacts bubble size. The setting chocolate is deposited in a moulded shell, after which the set interior is capped with liquid tempered chocolate. Factors that affect bubble size include qualities of chocolate, such as viscosity and the rate of setting. The ingredients used, such as emulsifiers and milk fats also impact bubble size; other factors include type of gas and how much pressure is applied.

Micro-aerated chocolate is created using the method of beating gases in under high pressure. Unlike aerated chocolates produced with large bubbles, micro-aerated chocolate has nitrogen beaten into the mixture. The resulting chocolate, different not only in bubble size but also flavour and texture. This is theorised to arise from the gas having a different solubility. Aerated chocolates containing long tubes of air are also created using this technique, but their distinction comes from how the aerated chocolate is extruded rather than set in a moulded shell. The final type, those held together by a skeleton of solid particles, are produced using water evaporation methods. In the first of these, sugar is dissolved in water. This solution is emulsified with cocoa liquor and milk solids, which is evaporated and then dried using industrial machinery, until the product contains less than 2% water. In the second, water is emulsified with liquid chocolate and set and then freeze dried, removing the water.

=== Research ===
A major source of bubble instability is when a wide variety of sizes of bubbles are created, gases in smaller bubbles diffuses or disperses into larger bubbles. This is due to their differing Laplace pressures. As of 2023, technologies to control bubble size, distribution and movement were difficult to employ during production. "Advanced" research was underway, including by companies such as Nestlé. In 2013, scientists released the results of experimental research on the impact of phospholipids on aerating cocoa butter. The research found that although all phospholipids tested made cocoa butter foam more, the foam's stability varied by type of phospholipid. The final cocoa butter was also observed to be more stable when the process was undertaken at lower temperatures.

== Sources ==
- Beckett, Stephen T (2008). "The History of Aerated Chocolate". In Campbell, Grant M; Scanlon, Martin G; Pyle, D Leo (eds.). Bubbles in Food 2: Novelty, Health and Luxury. American Associate of Cereal Chemists International. St. Paul, Minnesota: Elsevier Science. ISBN 978-1-891127-59-5.
- Beckett, Stephen T (2019). The Science of Chocolate (3rd ed.). Croydon, United Kingdom: Royal Society of Chemistry. ISBN 978-1-78801-235-5.
- Bradley, John (2008). Cadbury's Purple Reign. Chichester, UK: Wiley. doi:10.1002/9781119206361. ISBN 978-0-470-72524-5.
- Campbell, Grant M (2008). "A History of Aerated Foods". In Campbell, Grant M; Scanlon, Martin G; Pyle, D Leo (eds.). Bubbles in Food 2: Novelty, Health and Luxury. American Associate of Cereal Chemists International. St. Paul, Minnesota: Elsevier Science. ISBN 978-1-891127-59-5.
- Hyde, Dana; Ellert, James; Killing, J Peter (March 1991). "The Nestlé takeover of rowntree: A case study". European Management Journal. 9 (1). doi:10.1016/0263-2373(91)90044-Q.
- Fitzgerald, Robert (1995). Rowntree and the marketing revolution, 1862-1969. Cambridge: Cambridge University Press. ISBN 0-521-43512-9.
- Hartel, Richard W; von Elbe, Joachim H; Hofberger, Randy (2017). Confectionery Science and Technology. Cham, Switzerland: Springer Publishing. doi:10.1007/978-3-319-61742-8. ISBN 9783319617428.
- Peters, Dave J (2017). "Non-conventional machines and processes". In Beckett, Stephen T; Fowler, Mark S; Ziegler, Gregory R (eds.). Beckett's Industrial Chocolate Manufacture and Use (5th ed.). West Sussex, UK: Wiley. ISBN 978-1-118-78014-5.
- Pugh, RJ; Hamlett, CAE; Fairhurst, DJ (2023). "A short overview of bubbles in foods and chocolate". Advances in Colloid and Interface Science. 314 (102835). doi:10.1016/j.cis.2023.102835.
- Pfanner, Eric (27 August 2007). "Taste of Victory: Online Outcry Revives a Chocolate Bar". The New York Times. Archived from the original on 29 April 2018.
- Ziegleder, Gottfried (2017). "Flavour development in cocoa and chocolate". In Beckett, Stephen T; Fowler, Mark S; Ziegler, Gregory R (eds.). Beckett's Industrial Chocolate Manufacture and Use (5th ed.). West Sussex, UK: Wiley. ISBN 978-1-118-78014-5.
