= Wispa =

British brand of chocolate bar

Cadbury Wispa

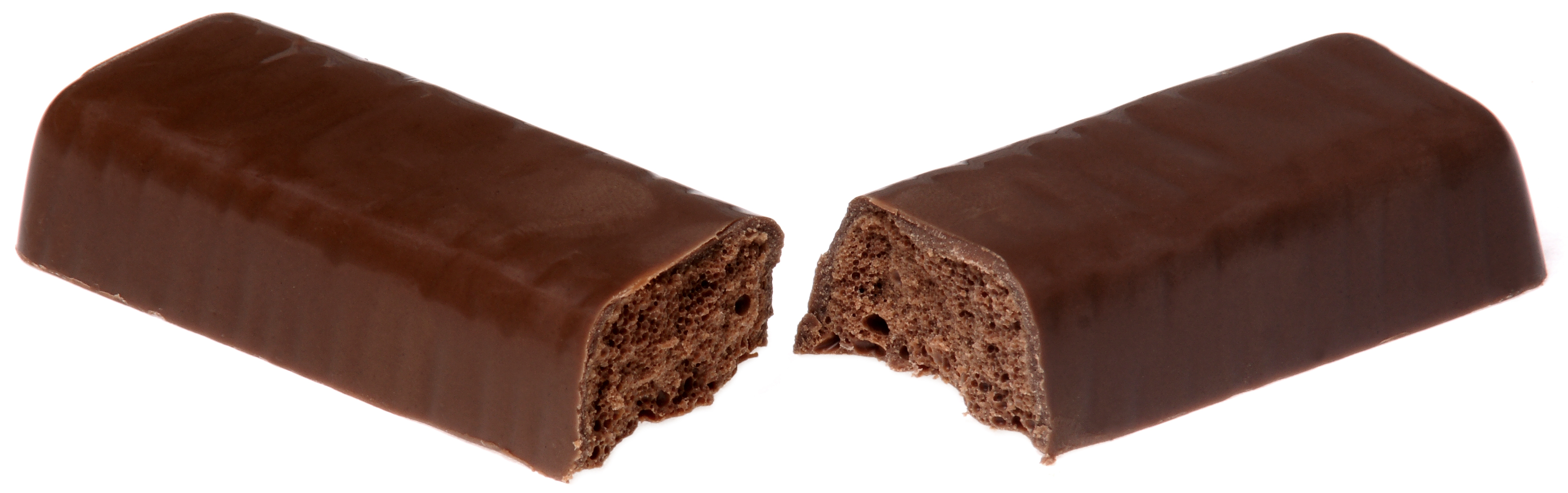
- A Wispa split in half
- Product type: Confectionery
- Current owner: Mondelez International
- Country: United Kingdom
- Introduced: 1981; 45 years ago
- Related brands: List of Cadbury products
- Tagline: Time Well Mis-spent
- Website: Official website

Wispa is a brand of chocolate bar manufactured by the British chocolate company Cadbury. First launched in 1981, the bar uses aerated chocolate and was seen as a competitor to Rowntree's Aero (now owned by Nestlé).

The Wispa brand was discontinued in 2003 and replaced by a different "Dairy Milk Bubbly", but the original Wispa returned as a limited product in 2007, helped by an internet campaign by enthusiasts, then permanently returned to shops in Britain and Ireland in 2008 due to popularity.

== Manufacture ==
The tiny bubbles within the chocolate form by aerating the molten chocolate with gas, typically carbon dioxide or nitrogen, while at a high pressure, which causes microscopic gas bubbles to form within the liquid. The liquid is then lowered to atmospheric pressure as it cools, causing the gas pockets to expand and become trapped in the chocolate. Air is not used to make the bubbles as this would oxidize the chocolate.

== History ==
An opened Wispa bar

The bar was launched in 1981 as a trial version in North East England, and with its success it was introduced nationally in 1983.

In 2003, as part of a relaunch of the Cadbury Dairy Milk brand (turning Dairy Milk into a family brand by taking existing brands and marketing them as Dairy Milk sub-brands), the Wispa brand was discontinued and the product relaunched as "Dairy Milk Bubbly". As part of the relaunch, the product was reshaped as a standard moulded bar (similar to other 'Dairy Milk' products) instead of a whole-bar count-line.

Since the discontinuation of the Wispa bar, a host of internet campaigns and an online petition to bring it back slowly gained momentum. During Iggy and the Stooges' 2007 performance at Glastonbury Festival, several Wispa fans invaded the stage armed with a banner saying "Bring Back the Wispa." In addition, several "Bring Back Wispa" groups on Bebo, MySpace and Facebook were set up. In August 2007, these campaigns prompted Cadbury to announce that the bar would be relaunched on 8 October 2007 for an initial limited production of 23 million bars, with a permanent return possible if sales are high enough. Predictions that the relaunched product would be marketed as Wispa Classic proved unfounded, and the new Wispa hit shelves in similar packaging to the original bar, a combination of the original colours and the slightly updated lettering style of the later bars. On 24 August 2007, the first box of the relaunched Wispas was put up for auction on eBay, with a press release from Cadbury stating that the auction was real and that the proceeds were going towards the Cadbury Charity, Ghana for the Source. The winning bid was £195 by a 23 year old Nicholas Bradley from the Isle of Man.

In February 2008, Rebecca Wells auctioned an original out-of-date Wispa bar, which she found in a sofa, on eBay for the charity LAM Action. The initial winning bid of £2,550 was found by eBay to be "unauthorised".

=== Since 2008 ===
The bar returned on a permanent basis in October 2008. Prior to the permanent launch of Wispa, for a limited time a Wispa McFlurry was available at McDonald's restaurants until 30 September 2008. During Easter 2009, a Wispa Easter Egg was made.

On 14 September 2009, Wispa Gold was relaunched for a limited time, following a Facebook campaign. The product was initially released for sale at Foreways on Warwick Road in Carlisle two weeks earlier, after the shop had been chosen from many around the country as part of a competition. As of 20 January 2010, Wispa Gold once again became available in Australia (having been previously marketed as the Crave bar) following parallel importing by Coles Supermarkets.

On 26 August 2011, it was announced that Wispa Gold would return permanently in November in support of team GB at the London 2012 Olympic and Paralympic Games.

In April 2013, Cadbury launched Wispa Hot Chocolate. In 2014 Cadbury launched Wispa Biscuits.

== Advertising ==
The bar was launched by teaser advertisements in 1983 bearing the phrase "Have you heard the latest Wispa?" which did not identify the product as a chocolate bar. Original Wispa advertisements, all performed to camera in front of a black background, featured well-known actors such as Paul Eddington, Nigel Hawthorne, Victoria Wood, Julie Walters, Simon Cadell, and Ruth Madoc. The Wispa advertisement from 1982 sees John Le Mesurier and Arthur Lowe (who died later that year) make a final appearance as their characters from Dad's Army. A 1984 Wispa advertisement saw American comedian, actor and director Buck Henry reprising his role from his written-acted nominated movie Heaven can Wait.

At the time of its comeback in 2008, Wispa was re-launched using large outdoor posters featuring the tagline "It's back. Apparently." and smaller, roadside posters featuring conversations about Wispa returning, which read; "Apparently, the Wispa thing is true. It's coming back. Finally. Brilliant." In December 2009, Wispa aired a television advert entitled "For the love of Wispa", starring members of the public recruited from an earlier advertising campaign.

In 2009, to mark the return of Wispa Gold a request for submissions to be considered for an outdoor poster campaign received over 7,000 submissions and featured over 900 different posters across Britain and Ireland".

In 2015, Mondelēz International shrunk the size of the Bitsa Wispa sharing bag from 130g to 110g and also reduced the size of the Wispa Easter Egg making it 78g lighter. The Wispa chocolate bar wrapper was also redesigned ditching the blue coloured wrapper for the traditional Cadbury purple. The wrapper was redesigned again in 2016, as part of the Cadbury 'Obey Your Mouth' brand re-positioning, in which the Wispa logo now resembles the shape of a balloon.

== Products ==
=== Available ===
- Cadbury Wispa: an aerated milk chocolate bar. Launched in 1981, discontinued in 2003, relaunched in 2007 temporarily but relaunched again in 2008 permanently.
- Cadbury Wispa Gold: an aerated milk chocolate bar with a caramel layer. Launched in 1995, discontinued in 2003, relaunched in 2009 temporarily but relaunched again in 2011.
- Cadbury Wispa Gold Duo: an aerated Cadbury milk chocolate bar with a layer of Caramel, in two-halves. Launched in 2020.
- Cadbury Wispa Duo: an aerated milk chocolate bar in two halves. Launched in 2010, discontinued in 2011 but relaunched in 2012.
- Cadbury Bitsa Wispa: aerated milk chocolate in little bite-size pieces. Launched in 2012.
- Cadbury Wispa Hot Chocolate: hot and frothy chocolate-based drink. Launched in 2013.
- Cadbury Wispa Gold Hot Chocolate: hot and frothy instant caramel flavoured hot chocolate. Launched in 2014.
- Cadbury Wispa Biscuits: a round biscuit with a layer of aerated milk chocolate, covered in milk chocolate. Launched in August 2014.
- Cadbury Endless Wispa: a long multipack of 4 Wispa bars. Available every Christmas since 2012.
- Cadbury Bitsa Wispa Sharing Tube: a tube full of little aerated milk chocolate pieces. Launched in Christmas 2014.
- Cadbury Wispa Easter Egg: a hollow milk chocolate egg with 4 Wispa bars. Launched in 1980s, discontinued in 2003 but relaunched in 2008. Available only at Easter. In 2015 the number of bars included in the Easter Egg was decreased to 2 Wispa bars.

=== Discontinued ===
- Cadbury Wispa Orange: an orange flavoured aerated milk chocolate bar. Launched 1994, limited edition.
- Cadbury Wispa Mint: an aerated milk chocolate bar with a mint layer. Launched 1995, discontinued 2003.
- Cadbury Wispa Bite: an aerated milk chocolate bar with a caramel and biscuit layer. Launched 2000 and discontinued 2003.
- Cadbury Wispa Strawberry: an aerated milk chocolate bar with a strawberry jam layer. Launched on 1994, discontinued in 1999.
- Cadbury Wispaccino: an aerated milk chocolate bar with a coffee-flavoured caramel layer. Launched 1997 and discontinued 2003.
- Cadbury Wispa McFlurry: soft serve vanilla ice cream topped with Wispa pieces and chocolate sauce. Launched in 2008, 2012 and 2023, after 11 years.
- Cadbury Wispa Gold McFlurry: soft serve vanilla ice cream topped with Wispa pieces and caramel sauce. Launched in 2012 and 2023, after 11 years.
- Cadbury Wispa Ice Cream: chocolate ice cream with Wispa pieces. Launched 2009 but discontinued in 2012.
- Cadbury Wispa Ice Cream Bars: chocolate ice cream bar with Wispa pieces, covered in milk chocolate. Launched 2009 but discontinued 2013.
- Cadbury Wispa Gold Easter Egg: a hollow milk chocolate egg with 4 Wispa Gold bars. Launched 1999, discontinued in 2003 but relaunched temporarily in 2009.
- Cadbury Wispa Gold Hazelnut flavour: an aerated milk chocolate bar with a soft hazelnut flavour caramel centre. Limited edition launched in 2021 discontinued in 2022.
- Cadbury Wispa Gold Salted Caramel: an aerated milk chocolate bar with a salted caramel layer. Limited edition launched in 2022 discontinued in 2023.

== See also ==
- Mirage bar - an identical bar released in Canada in 1983 by rival Rowntree's (now Nestle).
