= Powwow Water =

British bottled water producer, 1990–2010

- Product type: Spring water
- Current owner: Powwow Water Company
- Country: United Kingdom
- Introduced: 1990; 36 years ago
- Markets: UK/Europe
- Previous owners: Nestlé
- Website: Powwow.com

Powwow Water Company Ltd was a British producer of bottled spring water, producing exclusively for water coolers. The spring water originated and was bottled in Fillongley, Warwickshire. There was also a production site in Chesham.

Powwow Water was one of the most popular spring water brands for water coolers in Europe, used in all industries from commercial to residential.

The brand was originally created in 1990 by Hutchison Whampoa and was sold to Nestlé in 2003. It was then bought by Powwow Water Company Ltd (formerly Lomond Hills Water Company), which went into administration in March 2010.

Powwow went into administration in March 2010 and Wild About Water UK Ltd (part of 2468 Group) subsequently negotiated a deal to buy the assets of the business. They retained the POU watercooler customer base and sold the bottled watercooler customer base to Eden Springs UK

During their time extracting water in Chesham, the river Chess ran dry and remained so until extraction stopped, when within 6 months it had returned to its former level. This was the only time that the river has dried up apart from a short time during the drought of 1979. In 2005 Councillor Justine Fulford campaigned to prevent the extension of the licence to extract water, on the grounds that it was hurting the local environment.

== Fraud ==
Over several years there have been reports of companies chasing supposed unpaid invoices relating to "Powwow Water Company Ltd". Most recently between December 2014 and continuing in January 2015 demands and threats of winding-up proceedings are still being sent.

The agents acting on behalf of the Insolvency Service state "Nobody has authority to collect [this] debt and it has been this way since April 2013."

In January 2015 the Economic Crime Unit also re-iterated that demands should not be paid and that those who have paid demands should provide their evidence to the Economic Crime Unit, Glasgow.

== See also ==
- Nestlé
- List of Nestlé brands
