= D'Onofrio (brand) =

Ice cream brand

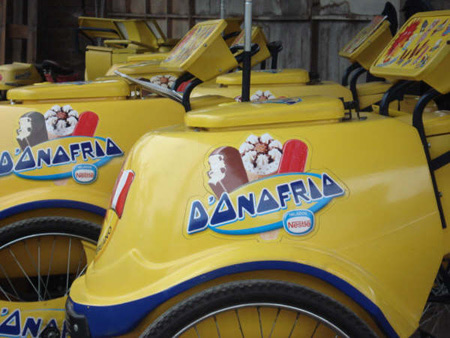
- D'Onofrio ice cream carts (with the D'Onofrio/Nestlé logo) pictured in 2009
- Type: Subsidiary
- Industry: Food
- Founded: 1897; 129 years ago
- Founder: Pedro D'Onofrio
- Fate: Acquired by Nestlé in 1997
- Headquarters: Lima, Peru
- Area served: Peru
- Products: Ice cream, chocolate, candy
- Parent: Nestlé

D'Onofrio is a Peruvian brand and business dedicated primarily to the sale of confectionery products. It was founded in 1897 by Pietro D'Onofrio. The company and its brand currently belongs to Nestlé Perú (acquired in 1997) (a subsidiary of the larger Nestlé company) and sells its products in the same country. D'Onofrio's products are aimed at a wide market, and are consumed by people of all ages.

D'Onofrio also has a share of the chocolate market. Its foremost product is Sublime, a small-sized chocolate with peanuts. D'Onofrio is also famous for its panettone which is on sale for Christmas and on Peru's independence holiday on July 28. There had been many products that are seldom for sale, like juices or cookies.

== History ==
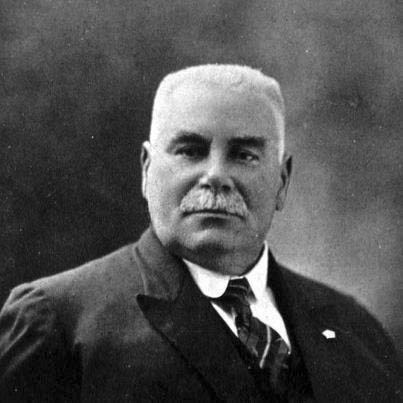
Pietro D'Onofrio, founder

Italian immigrant Pietro ("Pedro") D'Onofrio (1859–1937) arrived in Argentina at 21 years old. In that country, he learnt how to make ice cream from a friend of his family, Raffaele Cimarelli. After a brief return to his native country, D'Onofrio came back to Argentina. Cimarelli suggested him to move to Peru, to take advance of the Lima's favorable weather, considering it a good opportunity to set their business.

Following the advice, D'Onofrio and his wife moved to Lima, where they started the business, at first with only a yellow ice cream cart. In 1908 D'Onofrio acquired a plant to manufacture artificial ice.

D'Onofrio soon expanded his business to chocolate, manufactured with technology from Europe. Other products included cookies and candies. D'Onofrio died in 1937, being succeeded by his son Antonio, which took over the company and introduced new products to afford the increasing demand. In 1997, the company was acquired by the Peruvian subsidiary of Nestlé.

D'Onofrio's broadcast events with América Televisión: D'Onofrio's Home Concert (February 27, 2021). Event description: The first interactive concert to enjoy from home. With performances by Ezio Oliva, Combinación de la Habana, Hermanos Yaipén, Daniela Darcourt and other prominent personalities. Veranisimo: D'Onofrio's Veranísimo is a television program that broadcasts on América TV and is held on the boardwalk of La Gran Playa Agua Dulce in Chorrillos and at 12:00 am summer is welcomed with fireworks over the sand and the sea and a concert with artists and the animation (the hosts) are prominent artists from Peru or from the television houses of our Peru.

D'Onofrio events not broadcast on television and only on his social media:

D'Onofest (February 27, 2022): Peru's largest music festival on wheels for its 125th anniversary. D'Onoplay: An in-person event on the beaches of Lima, Peru, held annually to mark the company's anniversary. It's the same as DonoFest Virtual 2022, but after the pandemic ended, DonoPlay (DonoFest's successor) is now held in person.

== Ice-cream brands ==
D'Onofrio holds a large variety of ice creams with different flavors. Approximately 20 types of ice creams are sold throughout D'Onofrio stores and ice cream carts. Among the products are:

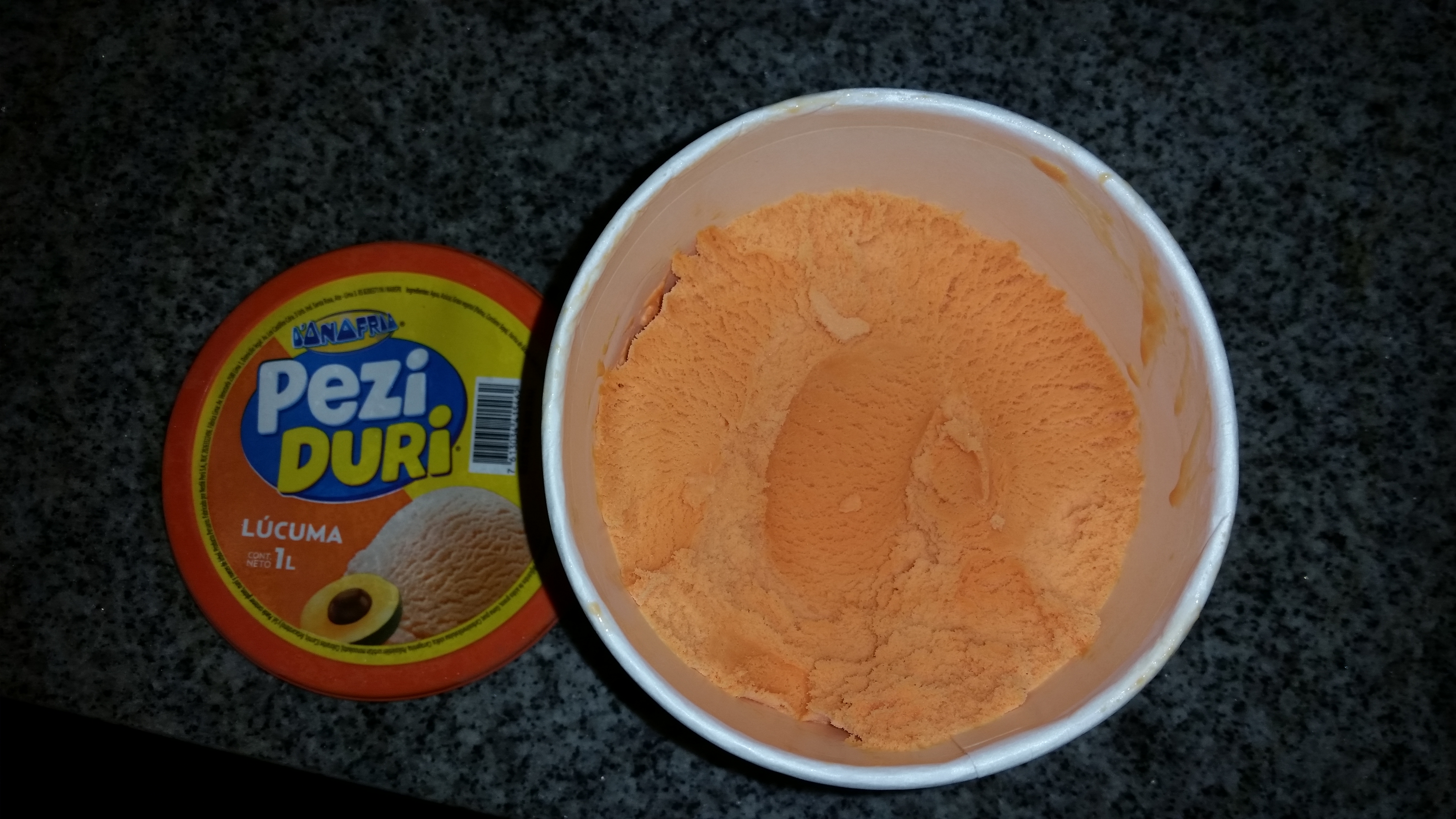
Pot of Lucuma ice cream by D'Onofrio

- Alaska
- Copa
- Bombones
- Buen Humor
- Copa K-bana
- Eskimo
- Frio Rico
- Huracán
- Jet
- Morochas
- Princesa
- Dono Sándwich
- Sandwich-ito
- Sin Parar
- Sublime
- Bebé (B.B)
- Pezi Duri
- Donito
- Lentejas Sorpresa
- Mulki (Leche Condensada con Fresa)
- PelaPop
- LokoPop
- Chúpate el dedo
- Raya'o
- Turbo y TurboMax
- Gragéalo
- Dolcetto

entre otros.

== Beach Delivery ==
D'Onofrio provides a delivery service, employing people along the coasts. They walk with coolers slung on their shoulders, with ice cream you can buy directly from them on the beach. D'Onofrio also offers carts to vendors, which ride through plazas, offering ice cream.
