= Chameleon Cold-Brew =

American coffee company

- Company type: Subsidiary
- Industry: Cold brew coffee
- Founded: 2010
- Founder: Chris Campbell and Steve Williams
- Headquarters: Austin, Texas
- Key people: Chris Campbell (CEO); Steve Williams (co-founder)
- Parent: Nestlé
- Website: www.chameleoncoldbrew.com

Old logo

Chameleon Cold-Brew is an American coffee company based in Austin, Texas. It is known for its cold brew coffee and is credited as the first fair trade and organic cold brew company in the United States. Since launch in 2010, Chameleon Cold Brew expanded nationally by partnering with small batch food networks like Farm2Me and GoodEggs. In 2014, Chameleon Cold-Brew was given the Best Coffee award by BevNET.

== History ==
Chameleon Cold-Brew was founded in 2010 by Steve Williams and Chris Campbell. Williams, a longtime coffee industry professional and coffee shop owner, created a unique blend of cold brew coffee to sell exclusively at his east Austin coffeehouse, Bennu Coffee. Campbell, who holds an MBA from Rice University, was working as a business consultant when he and Williams met at a neighborhood barbecue. The pair decided to join forces, utilizing Campbell's entrepreneurial ambitions and Williams’ coffee expertise, to bottle and sell a cold brew brand based on the original recipe served at Bennu Coffee. The pair teamed with Austin coffee icon and master roaster, R.C. Beall, to perfect the cold brew blend using beans from Beall's coffee sourcing company, Texas Coffee Traders. After months of experimenting with various brewing methods, beans and water sources, the recipe was finalized and Chameleon Cold-Brew debuted its first products in the Austin market in 2011 at a south Austin convenient store, The Whip In. The original cold brew recipe is still freshly brewed and served at Bennu Coffee's two Austin locations.

Chameleon Cold-Brew was able to gain traction in the marketplace by cutting deals with local vendors such as Texafrance who bottled the product for the company. By 2012, the company had its products in 225 stores in 18 states. The company received outside funding in 2013 by selling a minority stake in the company to Fortitude Capital LLC. Funding was used for product distribution, marketing, and infrastructure.

It expanded to selling its products to natural and specialty retailers, including Wegmans and H-E-B, including distributing to reach six of Whole Foods Market regions. Chameleon Cold-Brew was approached by Target Corporation to sell its products. The company originally turned down the offer from Target as it did not want to risk going into mass too soon. It eventually agreed to a test distribution for 81 Target stores in Texas, Colorado, Oklahoma, Kansas, and Louisiana. In 2014, Chameleon Cold-Brew was given the Best Coffee award by BevNET.

In 2015, Chameleon Cold-Brew expanded its distribution with Target to 520-plus stores throughout the United States. That same year, it raised $4 million of a $4.5 million funding round. Funding was reported to be used to expand distribution and research and development.

In November 2017, Nestle S.A., the world's largest food and drinks company, acquired a majority stake of Chameleon Cold Brew for an undisclosed sum, roping the Austin, Texas-based brand into its widening coffee portfolio and further positioning the food and beverage conglomerate to challenge and disrupt the U.S. ready-to-drink (RTD) market.

== Products ==
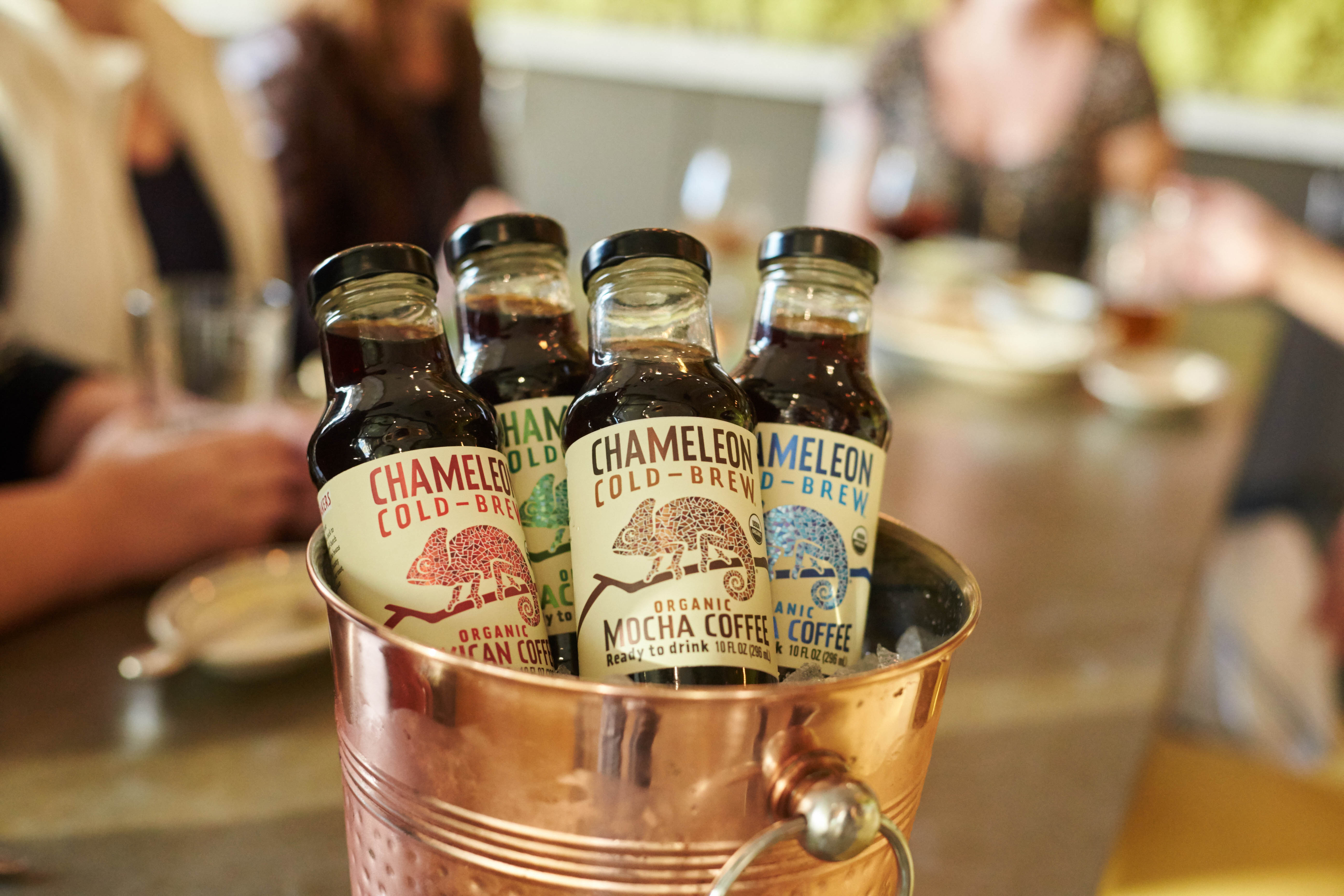
Bottles of Chameleon Cold-Brew.

Chameleon Cold-Brew offers ready to drink cold brew coffee. Its cold-brew coffee also comes in concentrate that can be made into cold brew coffee by adding water, milk or other liquids. Its products are made through a 16-hour brewing process that uses only fair trade, organic coffee, and limestone cured Texas Hill Country water for the brewing process. Its products are available in three main flavors; black, mocha, and vanilla. In 2015 it introduced three new ready-to-drink flavors (espresso, chicory and Mexican), which started as exclusives to Whole Foods Market. Other concentrate flavors that have been introduced are Caramel, Mocha and Texas Pecan. In 2016, Chameleon released its one-gallon bag-in-box black concentrate sold regionally. Chameleon Cold-Brew uses 100% recycled packaging for its products. It also ships using a carbon offset program through Green Mountain Energy.
