= Peppermint Crisp =

Brand of chocolate bar

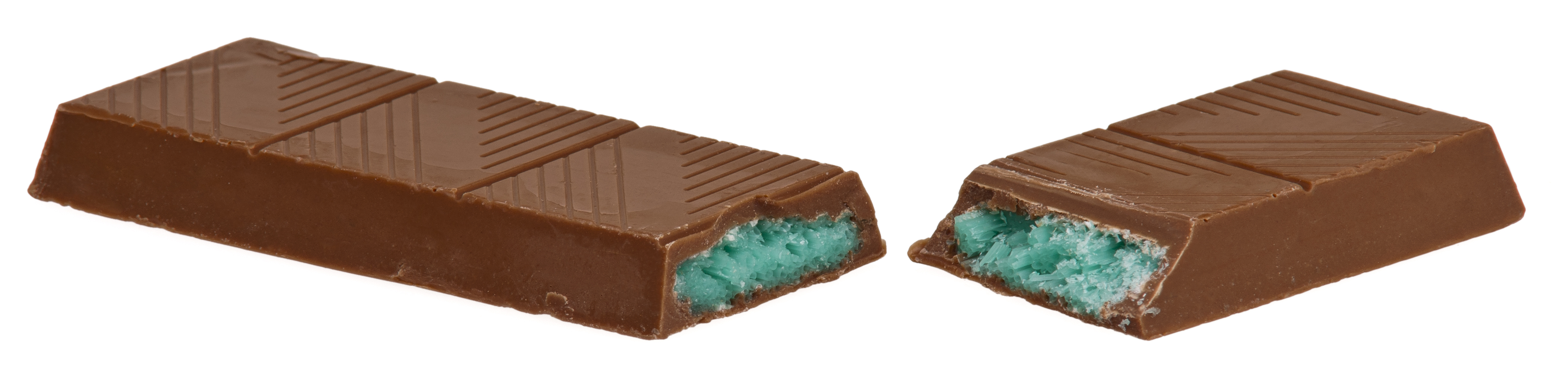
- Product type: Chocolate bar
- Current owner: Nestlé
- Country: South Africa
- Introduced: 1960s
- Previous owners: Wilson Rowntree
- Website: nestle.com/peppermintcrisp

Peppermint Crisp is a milk chocolate bar filled with a multitude of thin cylinders of mint-flavoured 'cracknel' (which is a brittle crystalline/sugar concoction extruded in fine hollow tubes). Invented in South Africa by Wilson-Rowntree in the 1960s, it was eventually bought out and manufactured by Nestlé South Africa. A hugely popular chocolate bar in South Africa for many decades, it is now part of that country's culture - not only as a confectionery item, but also as a popular topping used in baking and desserts.

The Peppermint Crisp is sold in South Africa as both a 49 gram bar and a 150 gram slab. In New Zealand it is sold as a 49 gram bar, and in Australia as a 35 gram bar.

In South Africa, it forms the basis of the Caramel-Peppermint Crisp Tart, a hugely popular South African ice box dessert. It is also popular as a topping on sponge cakes and cupcakes. Nestlé South Africa also sells an ice cream containing Peppermint Crisp shards, as well as a Peppermint Crisp dessert topping. Burger King South Africa sells a fusion dessert containing vanilla ice cream and shards of Peppermint Crisp while Krispy Kreme South Africa sells a popular Peppermint Crisp Tart gourmet doughnut.

As in its native South Africa, the popular chocolate bar is also used as a crushed topping on pavlova cakes or other cakes in Australia and New Zealand.

== Uses in cooking ==
The Peppermint Crisp can be used as an ingredient in mint chocolate cheesecakes and slices, and broken-up to decorate the top of pavlova meringue or cheesecake. James and Melanie Maddock used Peppermint Crisp on top of their dessert during a food challenge on the cooking show My Kitchen Rules.
