= Nestlé Wagner =

Pizza brand

Wagner GmbH
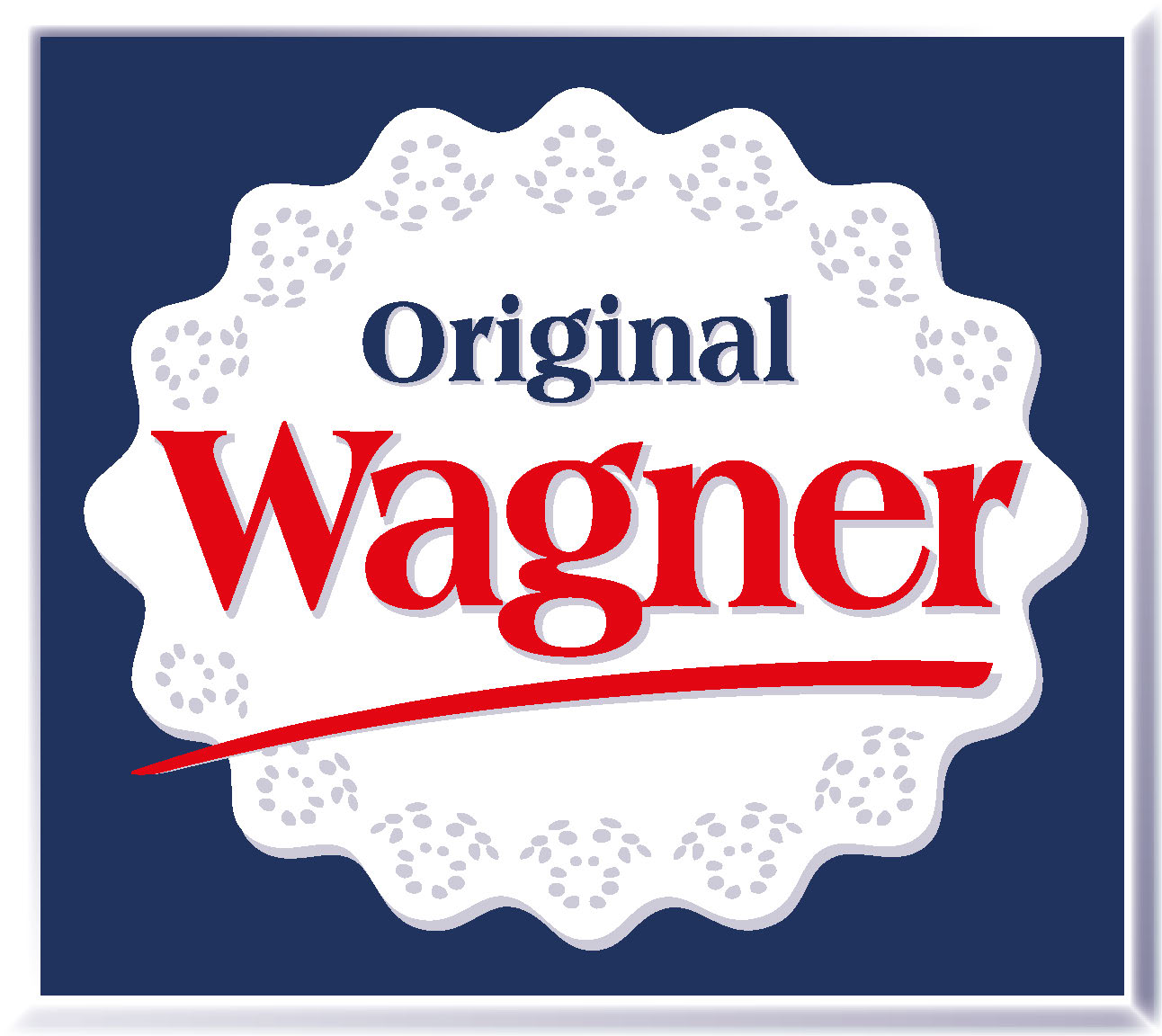

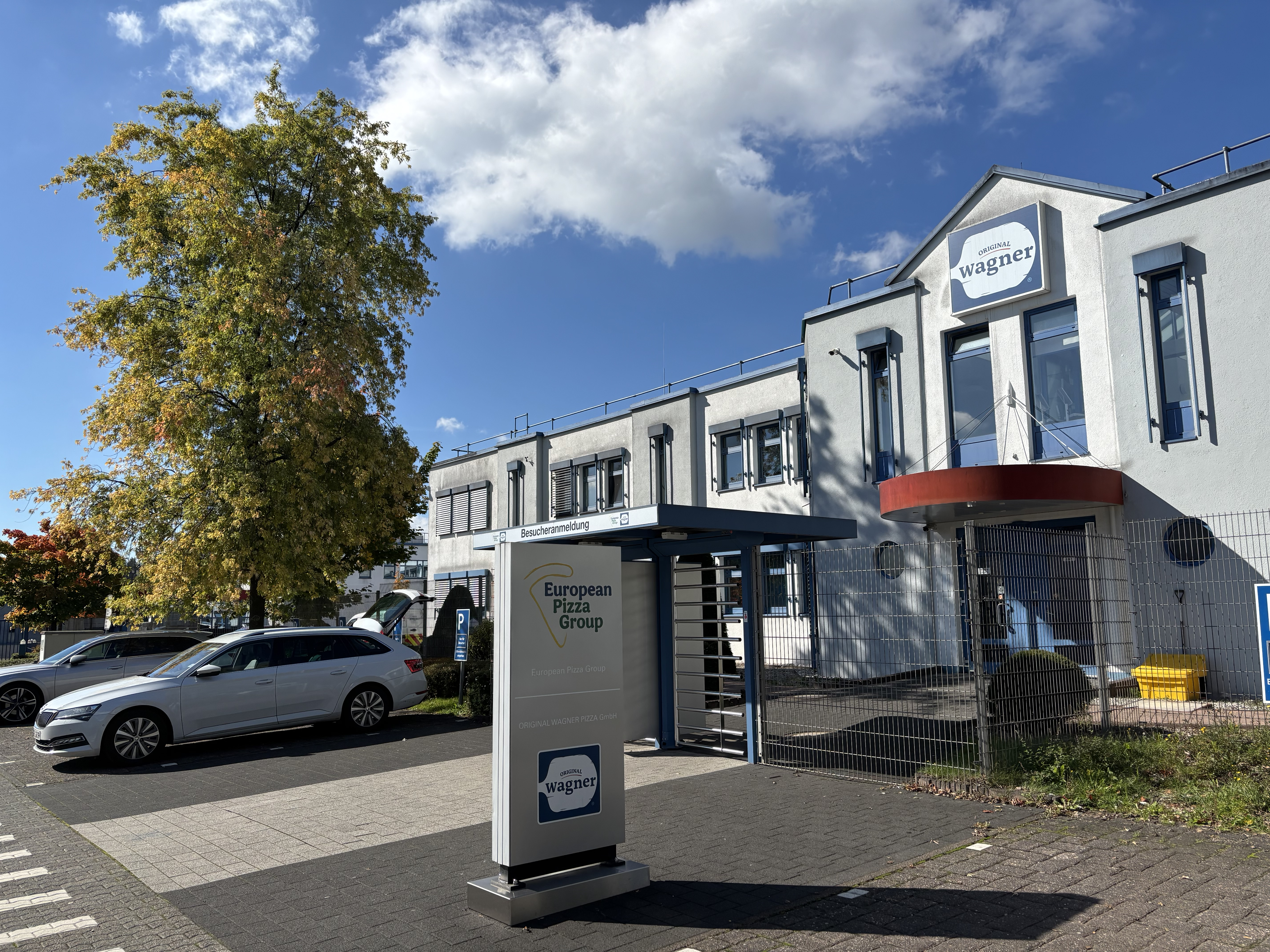
- Company headquarters
- Product type: Pizza
- Current owner: Nestlé (2010)
- Country: Germany
- Introduced: 1952; 74 years ago
- Markets: Europe
- Previous owners: Wagner GmbH
- Website: original-wagner.de

Nestlé Wagner GmbH is a brand of frozen pizzas, sold in Europe, founded by Ernst Wagner in 1952 in Nonnweiler, Germany, and since 2010 owned by Nestlé. Since 2023 it is part of European Pizza Group, a joint venture of Nestlé and PAI Partners. The new subsidiary also includes former Nestlé brands Buitoni and Garden Gourmet.

== Product series ==
- Sensazione
- Original Piccolinis
- Big Pizza
- Steinofen
- Flammkuchen
