= Texan (chocolate bar) =

Chocolate bar

Texan was a nougat and toffee candy bar covered with chocolate, manufactured during the 1970s and 1980s. It was withdrawn from sale in 1984 but was briefly re-launched as a limited "nostalgia" edition by Nestlé in 2005.

A 2004 survey of sweet shops' customers rated the Texan bar their favourite sweet of all time, by a large margin.

The advertisements for the Texan showed a cartoon cowboy, who was captured by bandits and tied to a stake. When asked if he had a last request he asked for a Texan bar which took him a long time to eat, during which time his captors fell asleep, allowing his escape. The cowboy's catchphrases were "Someone should have told em, Texan takes time a chewin!" and "Sure is a mighty chew!"
