= William Tyznik =

Professor of Animal Science in the U.S.

Dr. William Tyznik (April 26, 1927 – May 3, 2013) was a professor of the department of Animal Science at Ohio State University where he taught for over 40 years. Tyznik invented Frosty Paws, a frozen treat for dogs, and TizWhiz animal feed.

== Education ==
He attended the University of Wisconsin, College of Agriculture, and received his Bachelor's (1948), Master's (1949) and Ph.D. (1951) degrees.
