= Frosty Paws =

Brand of ice cream for dogs

Frosty Paws, formerly Pet79 and Fido Freeze, is a brand of ice cream, specifically formulated and sold for dogs. It is produced by Nestlé, under their Nestlé Dreyer's Ice Cream Company ice cream unit, branded under the Purina brand name.

The Frosty Paws logo

== History ==
=== Beginning − 1985 ===
Frosty Paws were originally exclusively available in the original (Vanilla)-flavor ice cream cups. The ice cream cups were originally formulated in the 1979 by Dr William Tyznik, a professor of animal science at The Ohio State University. According to Diane McIntyre, spokesperson for Dreyer's, the inventor was an ice cream lover and had noticed that old ladies often gave ice cream to their dogs.

Tyznik's decided to launch of the Vanilla flavor of Frosty Paws ice cream cups, under the first, and original brand name Pet79. The product was the first frozen treat for dogs ever introduced onto The United States market. Tyznik later went on to create and produce TizWhiz horse feed. By 1981, the brand's name was changed to Fido Freeze.

=== 1985−present, Acquisition By Drumstick, and Nestlé ===
In 1985, Frosty Paws was acquired by the Drumstick Ice Cream Company for an undisclosed amount. Frosty Paws was owned by Drumstick for a total of six years. In 1991, Drumstick, along with the Frosty Paws brand was in turn acquired by Nestlé.

Nestlé went on to introduce a Peanut Butter flavor of Frosty Paws ice cream cups in 2005, based on research carried out by its Purina PetCare Company division into dogs' preferred tastes. On August 19, 2011, Nestlé unveiled Frosty Paws Bites, a line of bite-sized, which specially formulated for dogs, who are lactose intolerant and cannot properly digest dairy products such as normal ice cream. Frosty Paws Bites contain vitamins and minerals, and are milk-free. They are available in Vanilla or Peanut Butter flavors (as are the ice cream cup variety of Frosty Paws), and coated with vanilla yogurt (a major difference from the ice cream cup range, as they are not coated in vanilla yogurt), they are the second, and latest line of products from the Frosty Paws brand.

== About ==
Frosty Paws produces and manufactures two product ranges.

The first product range is Frosty Paws Ice Cream Cups, this was the first product line that the company created. It was first marketed as Pet79 Ice Cream Cups, then as Fido Freeze Ice Cream Cups. Originally, Frosty Paws did contain lactose, powdered milk, refined soy flour, corn oil, and fortified vitamins and minerals; it had a vitamin content higher than meat. Its original flavor was vanilla. Tyznik stated that:

I didn't want something like candy for kids, but more like fruit for kids. For dogs. ... No, they don't need it more than we need ice cream, cookies, or anything else, but we have them because we like them. But, we like dogs too. And, if you're going to treat a dog, why not give them something nutritionally adequate?

However, Frosty Paws does not currently contain lactose, as dogs are lactose intolerant animals, and cannot properly digest lactose. Thus, Frosty Paws products are also called frozen treats, instead of ice cream. Frosty Paws cups are available in original (vanilla), and peanut butter flavors. The cups are sold in cartons of four-cups. They are also available at warehouse clubs in large, club-packs. Frosty Paws peanut butter flavor was introduced in 2005.

The second product range is Frosty Paws Bites. Introduced in 2011, Frosty Paws Bites are available in peanut butter, and original (vanilla) flavors. Frosty Paws Bites are also coated in vanilla yogurt. Similar to Frosty Paws Cups, Frosty Paws Bites are completely lactose free and are milk-free. Frosty Paws Bites are in very similar packages to Dibs Ice Cream, and each bite is about 2 inches (5.1 cm) square in size. They are sold in packs of 50-individual bites. They are also available in club packs at warehouse clubs.

Frosty paws were specially formulated with the nutritional need of dogs, which means they won't provide for the actual nutritional needs of other pets, such as cats. The cat's version, also produced by nestle, is known as cool claws, and it prioritizes the nutritional needs of cats.

== Availability ==
Currently, Frosty Paws products are only produced in North America, readily available throughout the United States and Canada. Some specialty pet stores in the United Kingdom, mainland Europe, Australia, and Asia also carry the line.

== See also ==
- Purina
- Dreyer's
- Ice cream
