= Loumidis =

Greek coffee brand

- Type: Franchise
- Industry: Food and Beverage
- Genre: Coffee house
- Founded: 1928
- Founder: Antonis, Nikos, Iason Loumidis
- Headquarters: Piraeus, Greece
- Area served: Greece, Cyprus
- Products: Coffee, Tea
- Owner: Loumidis family
- Website: www.kafekopteialoumidi.gr

Loumidis (Greek: Λουμίδης) is a Greek coffee brand and one of the first coffeehouse companies in Greece.

== History ==
The company has origins in 1920s, in Piraeus, as a coffee retail company by three brothers, Antonis, Nikos and Jason Loumidis. In 1928 the company officially was founded and in 1932 opened a coffee house at the center of Athens and one in Thessaloniki. In 1938 opened also the infamous coffee house on Stadiou Street which soon became a meeting place of intellectuals and artists. The company's motto is translated into English as, “Each one has an expertise and…for Loumidis that is Coffees."

In 1987 Loumidis SA, a company which had the rights of selling the Loumidis Greek coffee brand (with the notable parrot as trademark) was acquired by Nestlé.

== See also ==
- List of coffee companies
- List of coffeehouse chains
