= Sustagen =

Nutritional supplement beverage brand

- Type: Nutritional supplement beverage
- Manufacturer: Nestle (Food Science division), Mead Johnson (Asia only)
- Origin: Australia/New Zealand (Nestle), Asia (Mead Johnson)
- Introduced: 1950s
- Flavour: Vanilla; Dutch chocolate; Banana; Strawberry
- Ingredients: Non-fat milk solids (63%); Corn syrup solids; Whole milk powder; Sugar, along with a comprehensive blend of added minerals (such as magnesium, iron, zinc, and copper); Vitamins (C, E, B-complex, A, D3, K1)
- Website: www.sustagen.com.au
- Standard garnish: SUSTAGEN Recipes
- Served: Mixing 3 level scoops (about 60g) of powder with 200 ml of water or milk, stirred well

Sustagen is a nutritional supplement beverage brand, available in both ready-to-drink and powdered form, manufactured by the food science division of Nestle, and includes products for those with special dietary requirements for example, gluten-free, low lactose, high fibre, high protein or with added probiotics. The Nestle food science division also manufactures the Optifast Nutritional line, which includes weight-loss shakes.

== Mascots ==
Susy and Geno were mascots in Sustagen as a child form in mid-late 1980s until late 1990s. Later, they were revived twice, in 2008 (soft revived) and as an adult form in 2013.

== Varieties ==
The product comes in five varieties:

- Sustagen Ready To Drink: pre-mixed with milk and sold in a Tetra Pak in four flavours: Dutch Chocolate, Mega Choc, French Vanilla and Mocha Choc.
- Sustagen Ready To Mix: in powdered form for mixing with milk or water. Sold in a can in three flavours: Dutch Chocolate, French Vanilla and Mocha Choc.
- Sustagen Sport: special sport formulation, sold in powdered form for mixing with milk or water. Sold in a can in two flavours: Chocolate and Vanilla. Extremely high in protein.
- Sustagen Hospital Formula: special hospital formulation, sold in powdered form for mixing with milk or water. Sold in three different varieties: Chocolate, Vanilla and an unflavoured neutral.
- Sustagen Plus Fibre: special hospital formulation with added dietary fibre, sold in powdered form for mixing with milk or water. Sold in a can in two flavours: Chocolate and Vanilla.
- Sustagen Junior: Infant Formula from 1 to 3 years.
- Sustagen Kid: Pre-School for 3 to 6 years.
- Sustagen School: School Age for 6 years onwards.
- Sustagen Premium: Adult Formula in the Philippines in Choco and Vanilla.

== Media references ==
- Sustagen received a publicity boost when, on the advice of a nutritionist, it was one of the items sent through a pipe to trapped miners Brant Webb and Todd Russell in the 2006 Beaconsfield mine collapse. Russell, however, later joked to Eddie McGuire: "That Sustagen, I wouldn't feed it to my dog." Referring to the fact that they received the hospital grade version of the product, which is more nutritious.
- Sustagen, in 2006 initialised a sponsorship deal with the Austereo radio network, (the forerunner of what is now Southern Cross Austereo) in Australia that promoted the brand on podcasts of the network's radio programmes.
