= Frankford Candy & Chocolate Company =

American candy manufacturer, located in Philadelphia, Pennsylvania

Frankford Candy LLC
- Type: Private
- Industry: Confectionary
- Founded: 1947
- Founder: Sam Himmelstein
- Headquarters: Frankford, Philadelphia, Pennsylvania, US
- Key people: Christopher Munyan (CEO)
- Number of employees: 200
- Parent: Family Owned
- Website: Official website

Frankford Candy & Chocolate Company is an American candy manufacturer, located in Philadelphia, Pennsylvania, founded in 1947 by Sam Himmelstein.

== History ==
In 1947, Sam Himmelstein, a Russian immigrant, founded Frankford Candy & Chocolate Company in Harrowgate, although they would move to South Philadelphia in 1955. Frankford Candy & Co. was well known for their chocolate bunnies, although would later expand to other products. In 1982, Himmelstein was elected to the Candy Hall of Fame before dying in 1993.

In the 2000s, Frankford Candy & Chocolate Company became a very successful manufacturer. It is one of the largest producers of chocolate rabbits in the United States, making over 100 varieties. Stuart Selarnick, whose wife is the granddaughter of Himmelstein, was appointed as company president in 1998 and then CEO in 2000. Selarnick assisted Frankford in licensing popular children's TV shows, such as SpongeBob SquarePants. This partnership helped them create many successful products, such as gummy Krabby Patties. Frankford produces their candy in China, Pennsylvania and Italy.

In 2005, Frankford consolidated into a single factory in northeast Philadelphia, a project that cost over $20 million. The old factory on Washington Avenue was placed on the National Register of Historic Places in 2017 before being purchased and subsequently demolished.

Frankford purchased Cap Candy, a division of Hasbro, and the Wonder Ball from Nestlé in the 2000s. Wonder Ball has been reintroduced to the confectionery market in recent years following a temporary absence. Wonder Balls have utilized themed candy for Despicable Me, Super Mario, PAW Patrol, and Space Jam: A New Legacy.

In 2025, Frankford announced a transition to a new CEO, Christopher Munyan, who had been with the company for 38 years.

== Sources ==
- Brubaker, Harold (2006-12-08). "Healthful treats, but candy, too". Philadelphia Inquirer.
- Kleiman, Dena (1989-03-22). "Where Chocolate Bunnies Come From". The New York Times.
- Frankford Candy sweet on a license to thrill – Philadelphia Business Journal
- Candy company acquires Wonderball brand – Philadelphia Business Journal
- A sweetheart chocolate deal – Philadelphia Business Journal
