= Wonder Ball =

Confectionery brand

The Wonder Ball is a brand of chocolate initially manufactured in the United States by the Frankford Candy & Chocolate Company. The candy consists of a milk chocolate shell with a hollow interior that contains smaller candies. The Wonder Ball is wrapped in foil, placed in a small box, and packaged with a collectible sticker. There is a version of the Wonder Ball called the Wonder Ball Plus Prize that contains a chocolate ball that was filled with tangy dextrose candy, stickers, and a small toy.

== History ==
The Wonder Ball is a type of candy first introduced in the mid-1990s as Nestlé Magic Ball. The product contained small figurines of Disney characters, similar to the Kinder Surprise which retails in some countries. Its marketing slogan was "What's in the Wonder Ball?" The product was withdrawn in 1997 after competitors and consumer groups campaigned that the toy posed a choking hazard.

In April 2000, the Wonder Ball was re-released with candy in place of the toys. The product was marketed with various themes, including Disney, Pokémon, Cartoon Network, Care Bears, and Winnie the Pooh. In 2004, Nestlé sold the brand to Frankford, who released it under a SpongeBob SquarePants theme. An urban legend has circulated that the product was discontinued in 2007 because a child choked and died, but there has been no confirmation that the discontinuation was due to choking allegations.

After a nine-year absence, Frankford began producing the Wonder Ball with Despicable Me themed candy and stickers in February 2016. Other themes included: Shopkins, Dinosaurs, Disney, and Halloween. Wonder Ball Minis were introduced as two smaller Wonder Balls packaged together to enable sharing. In 2017, new themes were introduced, including Shopkins, Super Mario, Monsters, and Paw Patrol. In 2021, Space Jam: A New Legacy toys were released.

== Nutritional facts ==
The Wonder Ball had 130 calories per unit, of which fifty-four came from fat. The product contained 18 grams of sugar, 15 milligrams of sodium and between 19 and 22 grams of carbohydrates.

== See also ==
- Kinder Surprise
- List of confectionery brands
