= Supligen =

Liquid meal supplement

- Type: Liquid meal supplement
- Manufacturer: Nestlé; Seprod Group of Companies (2016–present)
- Origin: Jamaica
- Introduced: 1976
- Variants: Chocolate; Cookies and Cream; Coffee; Malt; Peanut; Irish moss; Seamoss; Strawberry; Vanilla
- Website: https://www.supligenja.com/index.php/flavours/

Supligen is a liquid meal supplement, or meal substitute manufactured by Nestlé (later Seprod Group of Companies). Supligen is fortified with vitamins, calcium and iron. It was first released in 1976 in Jamaica. Current flavors include Vanilla, Chocolate, Cookies and cream, Coffee, Irish moss, Seamoss, Strawberry, Malt and Peanut. The product is supplied as 250ml, 330ml and 1L tetra paks and 290ml pull tab cans.

== Availability ==
Supligen is available mostly in the Caribbean region (such as Jamaica, Trinidad and Tobago and several others) although it has been seen in other Latin American countries such as Brazil, Mexico, Panama as well as in several regions in the United States.
