= Beggin' Strips =

Brand of dog treats

- Product type: Pet food and snacks
- Current owner: Nestlé Purina PetCare
- Produced by: Nestlé Purina PetCare
- Country: Worldwide
- Previous owners: Ralston Purina
- Website: www.purinatreats.com/dog-treats/beggin

Beggin’ Strips is a brand of pet food and pet snack manufactured by Nestlé Purina PetCare. The product was first manufactured by Ralston Purina. The product's tagline is "Dogs Don't Know It's Not Bacon". The product is manufactured to resemble bacon strips.

== History ==
Beggin' Strips were first sold in 1989. Nestlé Purina started off by selling this product in North America.

== Nutrition ==
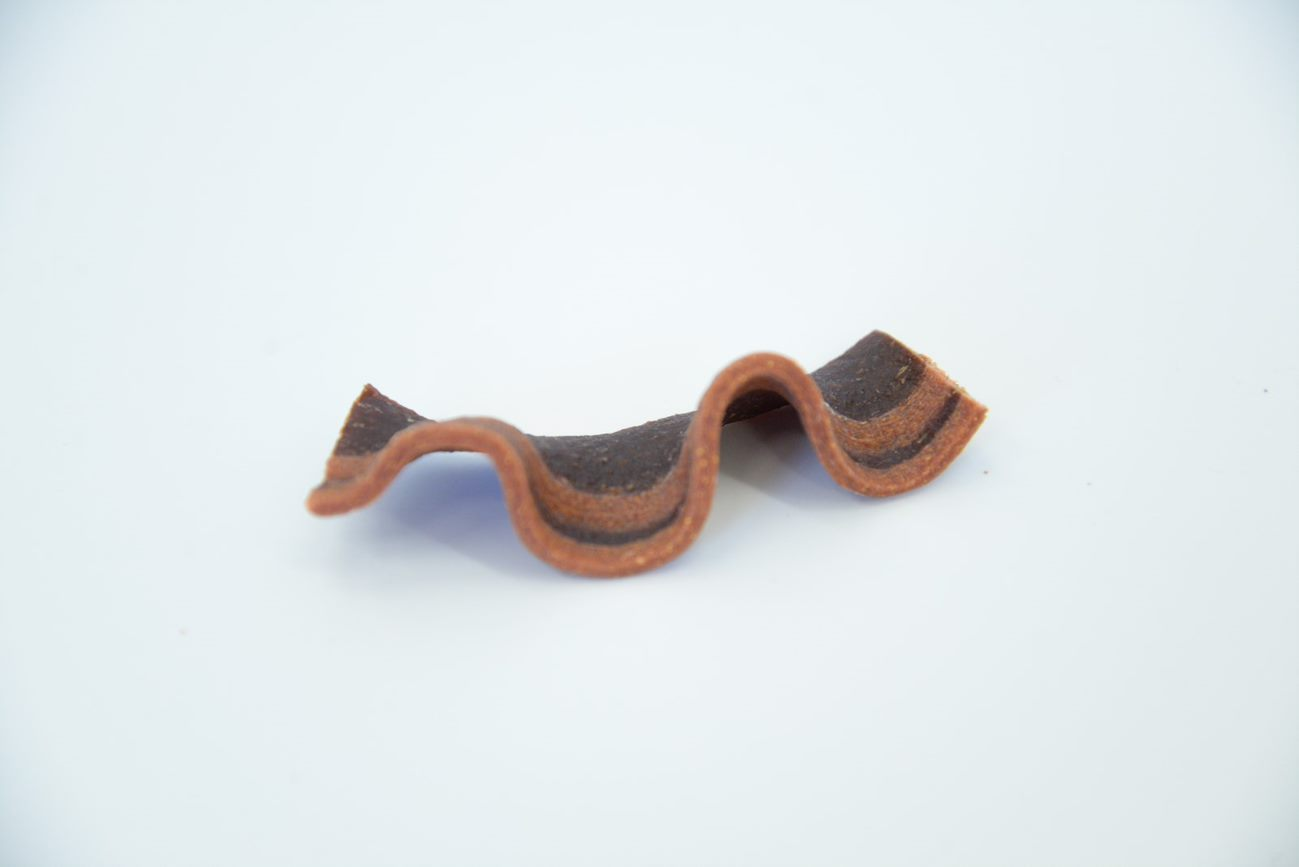
A Beggin' Strips treat

Purina Beggin' Strips contain some bacon and include other ingredients such as sodium nitrite and BHA as preservatives and corn gluten meal, wheat flour, ground yellow corn, water, sugar, glycerin, soybean meal, hydrogenated starch hydrolysate, phosphoric acid, sorbic acid, natural and artificial smoke flavors. The product comes in a variety of flavors.

== Marketing ==
The trademark bag for the product features a cartoon dog licking his chops while awaiting a treat. Created in 1994, the dog was named "Hamlet." Hamlet was chosen to appear in Nestlé Purina's advertising for Beggin' Strips, and to represent the product.

Purina holds an annual pet parade around the time of Mardi Gras. The Parade is held every year in Soulard, a historic French neighborhood in St. Louis, Missouri. St. Louis' Waterloo Courier also covered the Beggin' Strips Stupid Dog Contest on July 4, 1999. In prior years, the contest offered multiple monetary prizes, the grand prize being a $5,000 supply of Beggin' Strips per year and a trip to see the Late Show with David Letterman in New York.
