= Blue Riband (biscuits) =

Brand of chocolate flavoured biscuit

- Product type: Chocolate flavoured biscuit
- Current owner: Nestlé
- Country: U.K.
- Introduced: 1936; 90 years ago
- Website: nestle.co.uk/blueriband

Blue Riband is a chocolate flavoured biscuit currently produced by Nestlé. The bar was launched in 1936 by Gray Dunn, one of Scotland's major biscuit producers and a subsidiary of confectionery giant Rowntree's, as a real milk chocolate wafer – a crisp wafer biscuit covered in a very thin layer of milk chocolate. However as of December 2025 it no longer meets the legal definition of chocolate in the UK. They also produced a similar, non coated, wafer called Caramel Wafer. The Gray Dunn factory also made Breakaway. The Gray Dunn factory in Glasgow continued to produce Blue Riband until 1994 when Nestlé closed it down and moved production to Newcastle.

Both products came under the Nestlé banner when it bought out the Rowntree's group and Nestlé announced in April 2017 that production was to move to Poland.

The current biscuit is smaller than in the past. It is now packed in a sealed sleeve, whereas it used to have a cellophane wrapper with a large blue bow on it, twist closed at each end.

Gray Dunn itself did continue in business after its management team bought it from Nestle in 1997. It made its own brand biscuits for several UK supermarkets. It went into receivership in 2001.

Blue Riband was first marketed primarily in the North of the UK, Switzerland, Europe, and in the U.S; it was re-launched in December 2004. The modern version is not as crisp as the original, and the chocolate layer is sweeter and thicker. Blue Riband's primary competitor is the KitKat bar, also manufactured by Nestlé since 1988, which is a similar product and a main reason for the redesign of Blue Riband.
