= Mirage (chocolate bar) =

Brand of chocolate bar

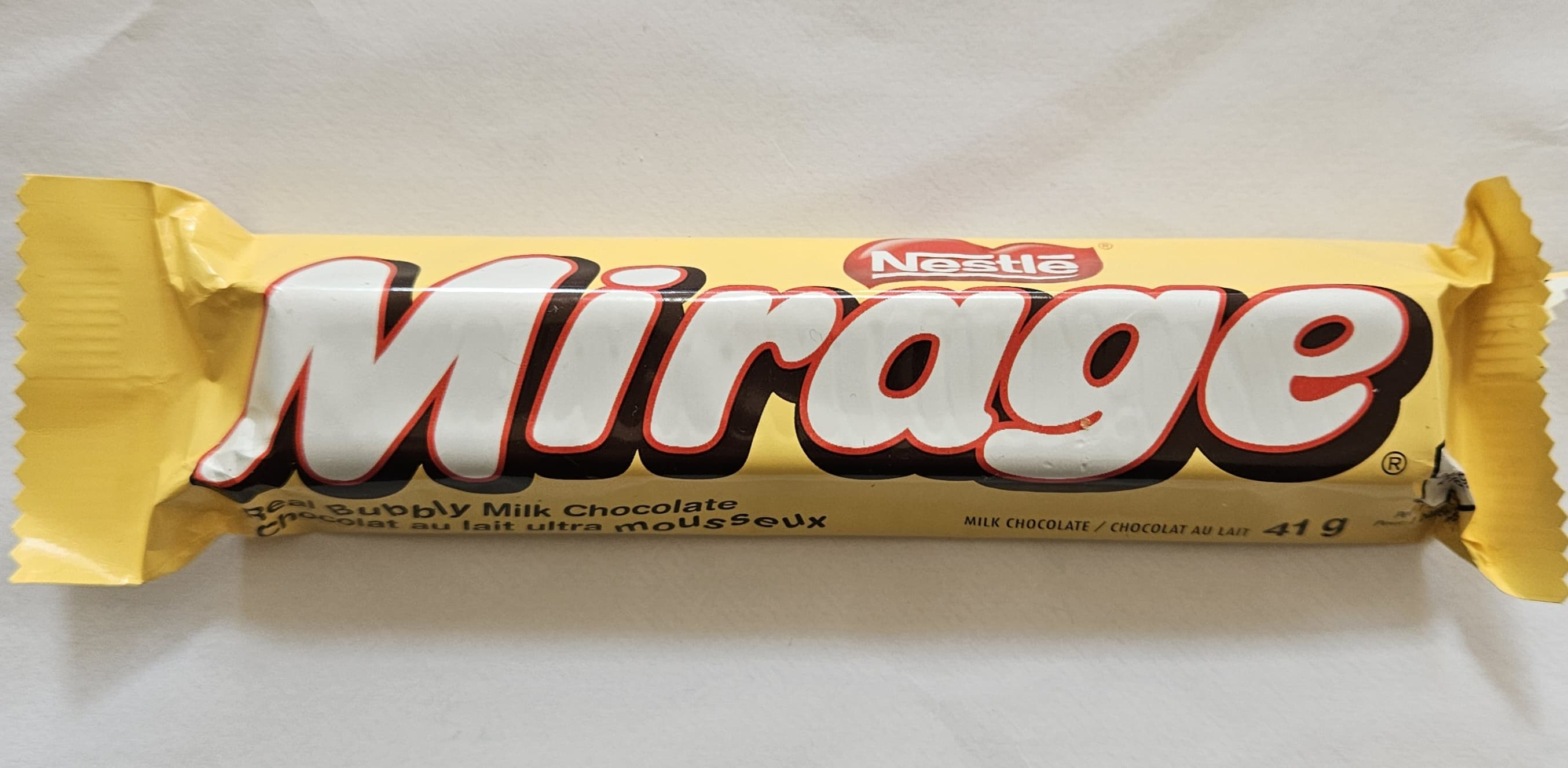
- Mirage
- Product type: Chocolate bar
- Produced by: Nestle
- Country: Canada
- Introduced: 1983; 43 years ago

Mirage is a chocolate bar made by Nestlé and primarily sold in Canada. It is a long chocolate bar with a trapezoidal shape, filled with bubbles. It was first sold in 1983 by Rowntree before the company was bought by Nestlé.

The chocolate bar is made by Nestlé Canada. It is manufactured in a peanut-free facility. It is sold in a yellow-white wrapper.

The Mirage is identical to the 1981-released UK bar by British chocolate company Cadbury, the Wispa. It is also similar in many ways to the Aero bar, also made by Nestlé. However, the Mirage is quite a bit thicker than the Aero bar and is not segmented or divided into pieces.
