= Aero (chocolate bar) =

Brand of aerated chocolate bar

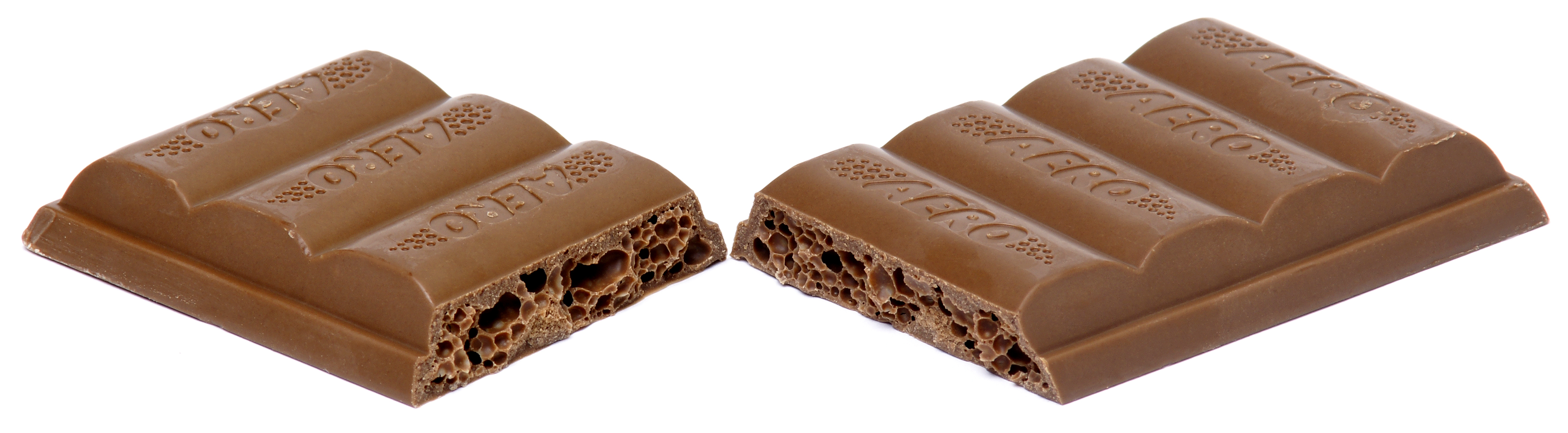
- Product type: Chocolate
- Current owner: Nestle
- Country: United Kingdom
- Introduced: 1935; 91 years ago
- Markets: UK, Ireland, Canada, Australia, New Zealand, Germany, South Africa, Japan
- Previous owners: Rowntree's
- Website: aerochocolate.co.uk

Aero is an aerated chocolate bar manufactured by the Swiss multinational corporation Nestlé. Originally produced by Rowntree's, Aero bars were introduced in 1935 to the North of England as the "new chocolate". By the end of that year, it had proved sufficiently popular with consumers that sales were extended throughout the United Kingdom.

By 1936, sales of the chocolate had reached the US, and later spread to many other countries including Canada, South Africa and Japan. Aero has been manufactured by Nestlé since 1988, after a takeover of Rowntree's. Known for its unique "bubbly" texture that collapses as the bar melts, it is available in many different flavours, and various forms including Aero Bubbles and Aero Biscuits.

== History ==
The process of manufacture was patented in 1935 by Rowntree's in York, England. The patent describes how the chocolate is heated and then aerated to create small bubbles. It is poured into moulds of the solid outer chocolate shell. As the chocolate cools, reduced air pressure allows the bubbles to expand inside the bar's filling.

In 1935, Rowntree's launched Aero into the United Kingdom, followed by the Peppermint Aero from 1959. The wrapping was brown (green in the mint version) and displayed the "Rowntree's" script logo and the large word "AERO", along with the slogan "Hold on tight or I'll fly away!" below the "AERO" name. In 2014, the historical 1935 Aero packaging was placed online by historians at Rowntree's to help trigger nostalgic memories in people with dementia. The vintage packaging from the Nestlé UK & Ireland Archive was later released as a "reminiscence pack" on advice from the Alzheimer's Society. It included a 1950s Aero label to transform modern products. The 1953 Aero packaging commemorated the Queen's coronation.

During July 1983, the heatwave in the United Kingdom caused the bubbles in Aero bars to collapse due to the chocolate melting.

In 1997, Unilever sued Nestlé, stating that Nestlé infringed Unilever's patent for aerated chocolate ice cream products.

In 2004, three workers at the York factory were dismissed for intentionally misprinting rude messages on the packaging of 20 pallets of Aero bars.

In 2008, the old Nestlé York factory on Haxby Road was closed, and a new £15 million Aero factory was opened next door, with the capacity to make 183 million chocolate bars per year. That same year, Aero's packaging was updated with metallised laminate film to improve freshness. In 2015, the factory was making more than one billion Kit Kats and 200 million Aero bars each year. Nestlé invested over £1 million in new factory equipment in 2015 to manufacture the new Aero Mousse bars.

In February 2015, York's Chocolate Story museum celebrated the 80th anniversary of the launch of the Aero bar with demonstrations and activities. In September 2015, fashion designer Matthew Williamson collaborated with Nestlé to release a limited edition wrapper design for Aero Milk Chocolate and Aero Peppermint bars. The packaging was in soft pink and mint shades with metallic highlights and Williamson's butterfly motif.

The Aero flavoured McFlurry frozen desserts were available up until 2015, and brought back in the UK in May 2019. The flavours include Aero Chocolate and Aero Mint Chocolate, with chocolate pieces and sauce.

In Brazil, the bar is known as Suflair, but in 2014 Nestlé launched Aero in Brazilian market through subsidiary Garoto; in Hungary, Aero is known as Boci Aero and in the Netherlands as Bros (meaning "brittle"). Aero enjoys a large market following in South Africa with Aero, Aero Mint, and recently White Aero and Cappuccino Aero.

The Aero bar was made available for a short time in the United States by Nestlé during the 1980s, though it seems not to have been a commercial success. They are still available at certain speciality vendors or supermarkets such as Big Y, Wegmans and Publix that import the bars. Previously, The Hershey Company sold Aero bars in the United States under licence from Rowntree Chocolate Company from 1937 until 1939. Hershey recently marketed a similar bar called Hershey's Air Delight but has since been discontinued.

=== Manufacturing ===
Aero bars were produced in Australia from the early 1970s until 1996. From 1996, the Aero bar was produced in Britain. In 2011, Nestlé recommenced manufacturing Aero bars in Australia at their Campbellfield factory in Victoria, with a capacity of up to 1000 tonnes per year. The bars had a different formula for Australian tastes with a smoother, creamier taste. The Aero bars sold in Britain would retain the older recipe.

In April 2001, Nestlé Canada announced that Aero and other bars manufactured at their Toronto factory would now be made alongside bars containing nuts. Nestlé no longer guaranteed that the bars were free from nut-protein contamination. In May 2001, the decision was reversed due to consumer outcry, and the company retained their nut-free guarantee for Canadian bars.

In 2004, Ukraine commenced producing Aero bars.

=== In other fields ===
In 1998, amateur rocket enthusiast Derek Willis was eating an Aero bar and was inspired by the bubbles to create the low-cost fuel, Asprop (Aerated Solid Propellant).

In 2007, an observational study published in the British Medical Journal explored the use of the texture of Aero and Crunchie bars as a technique to explain the difference between healthy bone structure and bone affected by osteoporosis to patients. The study determined that, while visually attractive, using the bars to demonstrate bone structure was an overly simplistic method.

In 2011, Ford engineer Carsten Stake was inspired by the texture of Aero bars in a bid to reduce the weight of plastic engine covers in their Focus vehicles. The MuCell plastic is injected with gas bubbles during moulding, making a microscopic honeycomb-like structure that is twenty per cent lighter and so lowers fuel consumption.

== Slogans and advertising ==
=== 1930s ===
The Aero bar was advertised in the late 1930s with the slogan, "You get a lift". Advertising about the imported bars in Melbourne, Australia in 1938 announced the Aero as the "...original English aerated milk chocolate... ...crisp, light and yet so sustaining".

=== 1950s ===
Production ceased during wartime, and the bars were relaunched in the 1950s. The relaunch campaign had commissioned oil paintings of 40 "ordinary" women, to highlight that the chocolate bars were an accessible treat for all. The slogan used was 'Different... For her, Aero - the milk chocolate that's different!". After advertising Aero from 1951 to 1957, some of the portraits decorated the York factory for decades. In 2013, Nestlé attempted to identify the models, known as "Aero girls", to better track their company history. The portraits were exhibited as "Who Were the Aero Girls? Discovering Hidden Art in the Archives", at York's Mansion House, and the project website. Some of the models were later identified as Barbara Pitt, Janey Ironside, Rose Wylie, Myrtle Crawford (later, Lady Acland) and Pamela Synge.

=== 1970s ===
In the 1970s, Rowntree's aired an advertisement in which children flew an Aero bar as if it were a kite.

=== 1980s ===
In 1980, Nigel Havers featured in a train-themed Aero advertisement, which was included in the Animated Britain online project.

In the late 1980s, the slogan "Each Aero Chocolate Bar Has The Nourishment Of Almost Three Ounces Of Milk" was created by Toronto advertiser John Straiton. In 1987, the advertisement won the Rotten Apple Award from the Quebec Corporation of Professional Dietitians, as the comparison between the nutritional benefit of confectionery and dairy was considered misleading. Rowntree had previously received the same Rotten Apple Award in 1984 for a similar comparison between the bar with milk in a previous advertisement.

The slogan for Aero in Australia during the 1980s was "It's the bubbles of nothing that make it really something." From the 1999 redesign and "singers" advertising campaign Aero's tagline was "Have you felt the bubbles melt?" This slogan was invented by Nick Welch, an advertiser and the father of Florence Welch of the indie band Florence and the Machine.

In circa 1989-1993, a young couple playing chess advertisement was popular in Ireland on television.

=== 1990s ===
The Aero packaging in 1993 in America had the slogan, "Melt into the moment.", supported by television advertising showing a woman taking a bath in liquid chocolate.

In 1996, Nestlé repackaged the Aero bar and relaunched it with television advertising that used voice-over by Dani Behr, and the phrase "Great chocolate taste." They changed the structure of the blocks to make it easier to break into sections. The advertisement showed a woman's day dreams while floating away during eating an Aero.

=== 2000s ===
In 2000, Nestlé apologised and withdrew milk and white chocolate cranberry-flavoured Aero bars from the market. The accompanying slogan "Stuff Xmas! Treat yourself!", was considered potentially offensive by the Church of England and led to the suspension of distribution. In January 2001, the packaging was described as featuring a cartoon turkey with the words; "Delicious Aero chocolate with a touch of sauciness - What could be more uplifting than bubbles that melt into delicious Nestlé chocolate?".

In 2001, The Aero White was relaunched as a permanent offering with a campaign theme, "Here to Stay". In May that year, Nestlé UK's "All Bubble. No Squeak." campaign was previewed online prior to television, an unusual step at the time. It was previewed on the internet first, as the mouse character, Aeron, was computer-generated and this was considered a good strategy. The advertisement slogan, "All bubble. No squeak.", and the clip showed a man buying an Aero bar, which included a free hula-hooping mouse. He declined the mouse as the chocolate bar was considered good enough as to not require gimmickry. The animated mouse later won Best Animated Animal at the 2002 All Star Animal Awards. The promotional campaign included people in mouse costumes in Manchester providing passers-by with a hula-hoop challenge in exchange for a free Aero bar.

In July 2001, presenter Davina McCall accidentally promoted Aero during a live eviction episode of Big Brother UK. She highlighted crowd banners that stated, "Hats Off To The Bubble," mistakenly thinking that they were about evictee Paul "Bubble" Ferguson. It turned out that they were advertisements for the chocolate bar.

In 2002, Nestlé Canada's research showed that consumers would often break the Aero bar into pieces and then let it melt in the mouth to prolong the experience. Their subsequent advertising showed two women, the first biting into the bar, the other responding, "What are you doing? That's not right.".

In 2007, Aero Hot Chocolate was promoted as an ideal Winter drink, with an animated bubble "Lovely Bubbly" television campaign.

In 2009, skateboarder Bob Burnquist featured in a UK ad called "feel the bubbles", filmed skating through chocolate coloured balloons, with the Jackson 5's song ABC playing in the background.

=== 2010s & 2020s ===
The slogan in 2011 was "Irresistabubble"—a revival of a 1980s campaign that also featured the same word, and was created by Salman Rushdie, during his time as an advertising copywriter. Rushdie has said that he invented a whole series of bubble words for the campaign, including Delectabubble.

In 2012, agency Skive created the 'AeroMail' social media campaign in which consumers could "spread the bubbliness" of Aero with a digital balloon on Facebook.

In 2018, The Interflex Group won the "Best use of process colours only" in the FlexoTech Awards for their work on the Nestlé Aero Chocolate Bubbles print design. The judging panel highlighted the use of CMYK with metallic effects by lamination, achieving a 'copper' look.

In 2025, Aero released a new flavour, coconut, alongside a campaign where 10 bars (not necessarily all coconut flavour) without any bubbles at all could be found on store shelves to win £10,000.

== Varieties and flavours ==
There are several flavours of Aero bars, with the Original being composed of milk chocolate throughout. The Aero bubble sensation has also been extended to other confectionery and dessert products.

=== Regular ===
- Milk Chocolate (original)
- Mint Chocolate (with a green, bubbly, mint flavoured centre, covered in milk chocolate)
- Orange Chocolate
- Dark Chocolate (70%)
- 2 in 1 Milk Chocolate Shell, White Chocolate Filling
- Strawberry was released in the 1970s.
- Lime for a short time in 1971.
- Cappuccino was released as a limited edition flavour in 1996.
- Latte
- Chocolate Hazelnut was released in 2024.
- Coconut was released in 2025 as part of the campaign where bars of Aero with no bubbles could be found.
- Snow (white chocolate) was relaunched in 2000. The Aero White, with a milk chocolate outer and a white bubbly centre, was launched permanently in 2001.
- Milk Chocolate with Cranberry Flavor [sic] was a limited edition release in 2000 and 2001, with a milk chocolate with a white chocolate flavour and a cranberry flavoured bubbly centre.
- Honeycomb, milk chocolate with honeycomb pieces.
- Orange, a limited edition introduced in Canada in late 2002. It was originally offered in 1995, and ceased in 2007. The flavour was then added to the 120g "sharing block bar" range in early 2011. A limited-edition Aero Orange single bar was released for three months in February 2012.
- Caramel was released in late 2004. It has a caramel flavoured and coloured white chocolate centre. Some varieties have a viscous caramel. The variant Aero Temptations included a caramel topping. A new Caramel bar was released in the UK in 2011, with caramel-filled segments.
- Crispy (similar to Nestlé Crunch bars)
- Vanilla Milkshake; Hot Milk; Green Tea; and Aero Cocoa flavours were produced in Japan.
- Irish Cream was available in Ireland around 2004-2005.
- Sticky Toffee was released in 2005.
- Vanilla Yogurt flavour was introduced in Canada in 2006.
- Chocolate Truffle bars were introduced in 2006 as a premium indulgent line.
- Pistachio was released in 2026 in the UK.
- Aero Milkybar, a crossover with Milkybar white chocolate, was announced in 2026.

=== Chunky ===
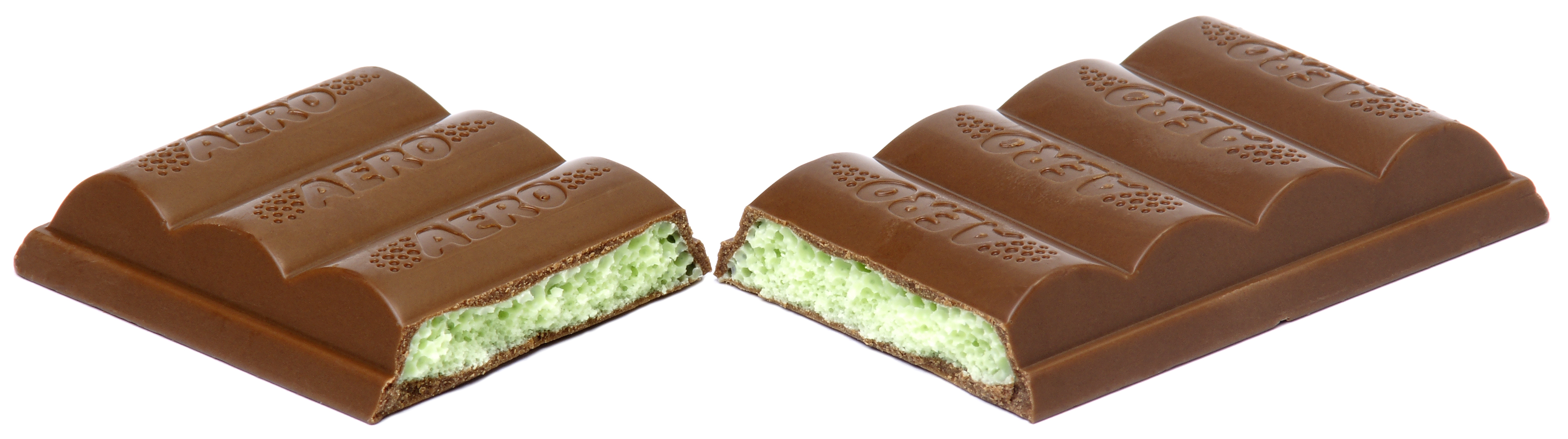
An Aero Mint split

- Milk Chocolate. The Chunky variety was released in Canada in late 2001.
- Mint Chocolate "Limited Edition" (2000 to 2010)
- White Chocolate, released with a white chocolate centre as a limited edition for Christmas 1998, and Christmas 2002.

=== Aero Bubbles & Melts ===
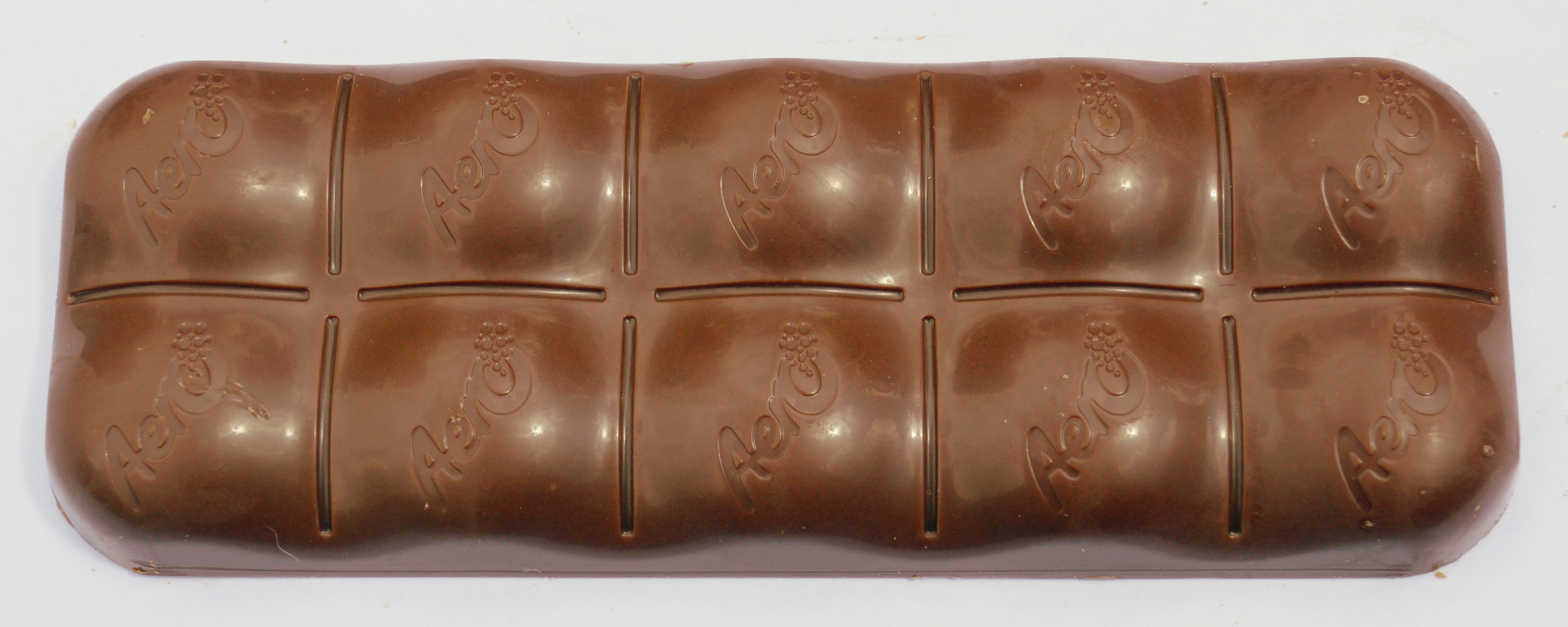
Aero bar with a bubble shape for each segment

Aero Bubbles are balls of aerated chocolate with a chocolate shell, sold in a resealable bag and Melts were near flat disk-like aerated chocolates, with a chocolate shell. It seems as though Melts were discontinued in 2024, however there was an Easter Egg featuring the neapolitan flavour released in 2025.

In 2012, Nestlé removed artificial colours, flavours and preservatives from its entire confectionery range. The green colouring of the Mint Aero Bubbles product was changed to result from a plant extract.

- Milk Chocolate
- Mint Chocolate
- Orange Chocolate
- Strawberry Milk Chocolate
- White Bubbles bars were released in Australia in 2001, with a milk chocolate outer and white chocolate bubble centre.
- Caramel Bubble Bar consists of a Caramel flavoured white chocolate centre with a milk chocolate coating.
- Milk Chocolate Melts
- Orange Chocolate Melts
- Caramel Chocolate Melts
- Golden Honeycomb Melts - Golden coloured honeycomb flavoured chocolate
- Neapolitan Ice Cream Melts - Mixture of strawberry, vanilla and chocolate melts

=== Aero Biscuits ===
On 4 May 2011, Nestlé introduced the Aero Biscuit. Aero Biscuit consists of the classic flavour Aero chocolate and round pieces of biscuit. It is currently sold throughout the United Kingdom and Ireland.

- Milk Chocolate
- Mint Chocolate
- Orange Chocolate
- Pink Lemonade

=== Aero Bubble Biscuits ===
- Milk Chocolate

=== Aero Mousse (Bubbly Dessert) ===
- Mousse, a chilled dessert in milk and peppermint flavours. It was the first collaborative product by Nestlé and Rowntree after the takeover of Rowntree in June 1998. Details of the mousse were released in 1990, but there was no planned consumer advertising for that year due to possible advertising agency conflicts between the different brands. The mousse was produced by Nestlé's subsidiary Chambourcy yogurt brand. Nestlé Aero Mousse was introduced in Australia in 2001 in Chocolate and Chocolate Mint flavours. In 2008, the UK mousse range was expanded from Milk and White Chocolate flavours with Mint and Choc. They were also renamed to Aero Bubbly Dessert. In 2017, the premium mousse, Aero Heavenly was released as a dessert sharing product.

=== Aero Mousse (bar) ===
- The Aero mousse chocolate bar was launched in May 2015. The filling had a combination of Aero chocolate and chocolate mousse inside a chocolate shell. It was released in single and sharing bars.

=== Aero Drinks ===
- Aero chocolate drink was released in chocolate and chocolate mint flavours in February 1991. The drinks were advertised for teenagers and young adults with the same animated characters as those in Rowntree's Aero bar ads. The 200ml packaging encouraged consumers to "Chill 'n' shake" to produce Aero-like bubbles in the liquid. The 180ml-sized chocolate orange flavour was added in March 1992.
- Aero Instant Bubbly hot chocolate sachets were released to foodservices in 2005, and to the consumer market in 2006. The sachets made frothy bubbly drinks in Chocolate and Mint Chocolate flavours. In catering, the powder is mixed into a paste with hot water, then added to steamed milk, with bubbles characteristic of the Aero chocolate bar.

=== Aero Ice Cream ===
- Aero Ice Cream bars were released in the United Kingdom in 1995. The 60ml bars contained Aero chocolate inside a chocolate shell, surrounded by Aero chocolate ice cream. In 2010, R&R Ice Cream in Yorkshire was contracted to make two types of Aero ice cream. These were: Aero Double Bubble, a mint and chocolate ice cream containing aerated pieces of chocolate; and Aero Bubbleball, a frozen chocolate and mint mousse pot with a ball of Aero chocolate.

=== Aero Bliss ===
- In April 2019, premium individually wrapped Aero boxed chocolates were released. The boxes were available in Milk Chocolate, Salted Caramel and a Mixed Selection (milk chocolate, salted caramel and praline flavours). The chocolates had a flavoured bubbled centre with crispy piece inclusions, in a chocolate shell.

=== Seasonal editions ===
- The Aero Mint Egg was released in January 1996 and had light green mint-flavoured bubbles inside milk chocolate. A giant Aero Mint Egg was also available during Easter 1999. In 2006, Nestlé planned a half-mint and half-milk chocolate shell egg for the following Easter. The 2009 Easter range was planned to include a small filled Aero Bubbles egg. In 2010, Nestlé Canada introduced Aero in the shape of an egg for Easter. The 2011 Easter range was to include the Aero Luvabubble Lamb. Aero Lambs returned in 2012 with a peppermint centre and a Lamb Giant Egg. In 2013 the Easter range included the Aero Bubbles peppermint Insider Egg and the Aero Selection Giant Egg (with peppermint, orange and milk chocolate Aero bars). In 2016, Nestlé publicised the "chocolate egg with bubbly bars" as chocolate firms avoided the word "Easter" in their branding.
- Nestlé's 1996 Christmas range included an Aero Christmas Pie, which combined Aero chocolate with spicy orange filling in the shape of a pie. The Christmas Pie also featured in 1997, and was changed in 1998 to green centred Aero Mint Pies. For 2011, they made a chocolate Aero Christmas Tree filled with bubbly peppermint, which also returned in 2012 and then in 2013 with an improved pack design. The Aero White Winter sharing block for Christmas 2015 had wrapping depicting sparkling silver baubles.
- An Aero Milk Chocolates Heart Box, 112g red heart-shaped box was promoted for teens in Canada for Valentine's Day 2003.

== See also ==
- Mirage (chocolate)
- Wispa
- List of chocolate bar brands
