= Brian Sollitt =

British confectioner

Brian Lawrence Sollitt (16 November 1938 – 16 July 2013) was the long-time head confectioner at Rowntrees and the inventor of the After Eight, Lion bars, Yorkies, and other brands of confectionery.

== Early life ==
Sollitt was born in 1938 in York and gained his first job at the Rowntree factory at the age of 15 where he hand-piped chocolates for boxes of Black Magic. He was promoted to the Creme Experimentation division and was asked to create a dark chocolate filled with peppermint.

== Career ==
Sollitt worked for 53 years with Rowntree’s in York, helping create many of the company's best-selling chocolate bars. He was part of the team responsible for the creation of the Yorkie, Matchmakers, the Drifter and the Lion Bar lines.

He played a key role in the team that developed the After Eight mint. This creation was first released to the market in 1962 and sold more than a billion units. He was told, when he created the After Eight mint that the project was to be kept quiet and the process Sollitt developed to prevent the liquid fondant from oozing out of the chocolate casing remained a secret for many years. The After Eight mints are now sold in more than 50 countries. He became an avid collector of After Eight paraphernalia and had one of the largest collections in the world.

Sollitt retired at the age of 68 in 2007, but came out of retirement in 2012 to celebrate the 50th anniversary of the After Eight and presented a special 3 kg version to Parliament. He taught his craft to other staff at Rowntree.

== Recollections ==
Confectioner colleague Kath Musgrove said: "Watching Brian at work was like watching a true craftsman at his trade. He spent hours at a marble slab expertly hand-covering chocolates each with their own individual markings on. He was an ideas man and Brian bombarded the marketing team with his thoughts on what they should sell next. He was instrumental over the years in assisting with the launch of many new products."

Alex Hutchinson, a historian for Nestle (which owns Rowntree's), said: "Brian's impact on the British confectionery industry is incalculable. It is easy to forget that the sweets we pick up in the shops today are things that would have been handmade lovingly in the early stages of development by Brian. He spent months, or sometimes years, agonising over the technical details of his creations. He was an incredible man. He was asked to come up with this new chocolate and he did."

== Charity work ==
Sollitt raised money for charities. He made giant Easter Eggs and, on one occasion, a 3-foot chocolate Pudsey Bear for Children in Need. He decorated his home with 500 Father Christmases each year on Christmas and opened his house to aid charities, charging an entry fee of £1.

== Death ==
Sollitt died of a heart attack at the age of 74 on 16 July 2013. He is survived by his sister, Hazel, two nieces and two nephews.
