= List of Mini limited editions =

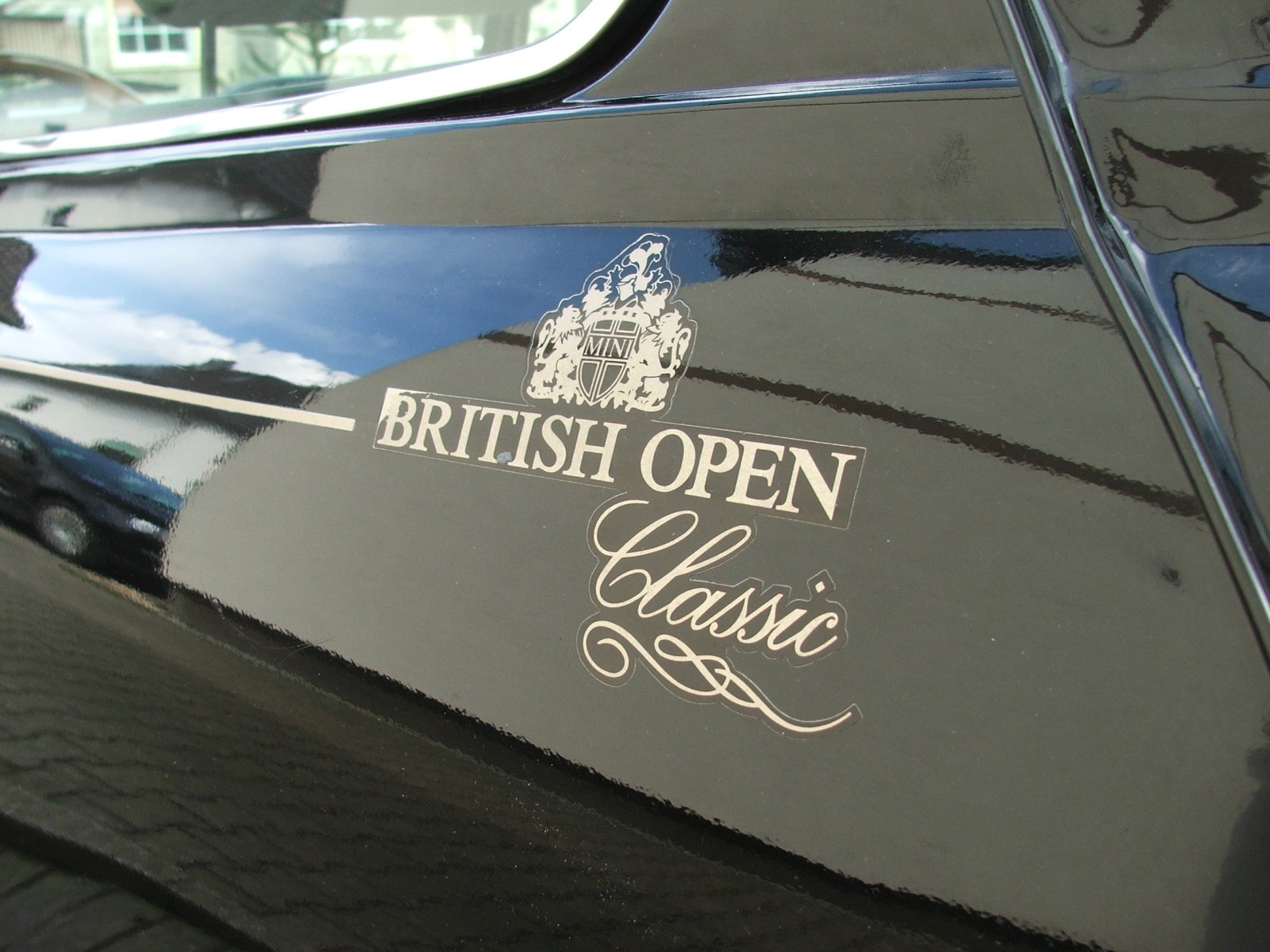
Decals on the "British Open" limited edition Mini

The Mini was offered in a number of limited editions that usually included a special combination of trim and badging, but some also included mechanical upgrades.

== Anniversary editions ==
=== Mini 20 ===
see below Mini 1100 Special

=== Mini 25 ===
- Year: 1984 (July)
- Based on: Mini Mayfair
- Engine: 998 cc
- Exterior colour:
  - Silver Leaf Metallic (MME - BLVC421)
- Exterior trim: Nimbus Grey
- Decals/badges: Side and rear grey and red stripes with "Mini 25" logos
- Interior: Luxury velvet with red piping, zip pockets fitted to front seats, red seat belts, leather-wrapped steering wheel
- Equipment: 12-inch wheels, 14570R12 Pirelli Cinturato CN54 tyres, 8.4-inch front disc brakes, full-width wheel trim with arch extensions, 1275GT instrumentation, tinted glass, stereo radio cassette, twin door mirrors
- Production: 3,500 in UK, 1,500 exported
- Vehicles exported to Germany: no radio
- Certificate issued to original owner

=== Mini 30 ===
- Year: 1989 (June)
- Based on: Mini Mayfair
- Engine: 998 cc
- Exterior colour: Cherry Red and Black
  - Cherry Red (COG - BLVC843)
  - Black (PMA - BLVC90) with an antique gold coloured engine block and cylinder head
- Exterior trim: Chrome bumpers and grille
- Decals/badges: Coachlines and 1959-1989 crests
- Interior: Half leather/lightning cloth, red piping
- Equipment: Minilite-style wheels, security coded stereo, leather-bound copy of Rob Golding's book ("Mini")
- Production: 3,000 for UK

Of the 3,000 produced for the UK, 2,000 were in Cherry Red and 1,000 were Black; 2,800 were manual and 200 had an automatic gearbox. 600 were made with an optional sun roof.

=== Mini 35 ===
- Year: 1994
- Based on: Mini Sprite
- Engine: 4-cylinder, 1275 cc SPi (standard compression ratio, 9.4:1)
- Exterior colour(s): Arizona Blue, Nevada Red, Diamond White and some references in Black edition for Germany (ROVER- Mini British Open Classic Black 1994 1275 SPi)
- Exterior trim: Chrome grille, lock set and door handles, auxiliary driving lamps. Electric adjustable headlamp aim. Export option: Webasto sunroof.
- Decals/badges: COACHLINE, single, car set, Silver - DECAL, body side, '35', Silver, Nimbus Grey and Pink - DECAL, body side, '35', Gold and Charcoal - DECAL, boot lid, '35', Silver, Nimbus Grey and Pink - DECAL, boot lid, '35', Gold and Charcoal
- Interior: Blue-and-pink "Jamboree" fabric; export option: all-leather, perforated leather inserts, colored piping that matched the exterior. Full walnut wood dash and door cappings.
- Equipment: Opening rear windows, R652 stereo
- Production: 1,000 for UK (RHD), 400 for export (LHD)

The 35 did not come with alloy wheels as standard. An automatic transmission was offered as an option. This limited edition was also offered in France, Italy and Japan, although it was identified by different names in those markets. The Japanese version was called the Mini Classic 35 and was painted more somber colors than the UK versions, coupled with a leather interior with piping to match the exterior.

Four hundred left-hand drive Mini 35 cars were also built for export to the Netherlands and Germany late in the model year (November 1994). These were painted British Racing Green Metallic and had all-leather interior with piping trim that matched the exterior color. Some references were painted in black edition. They had 13-inch alloy wheels and extended wheel arches. The LHD cars also had the same silver lines, special decals, and some units with a special wood-rimmed steering wheel and 35th anniversary horn button. Only a few were sold and the rest were rebadged and sold as 1995 models.

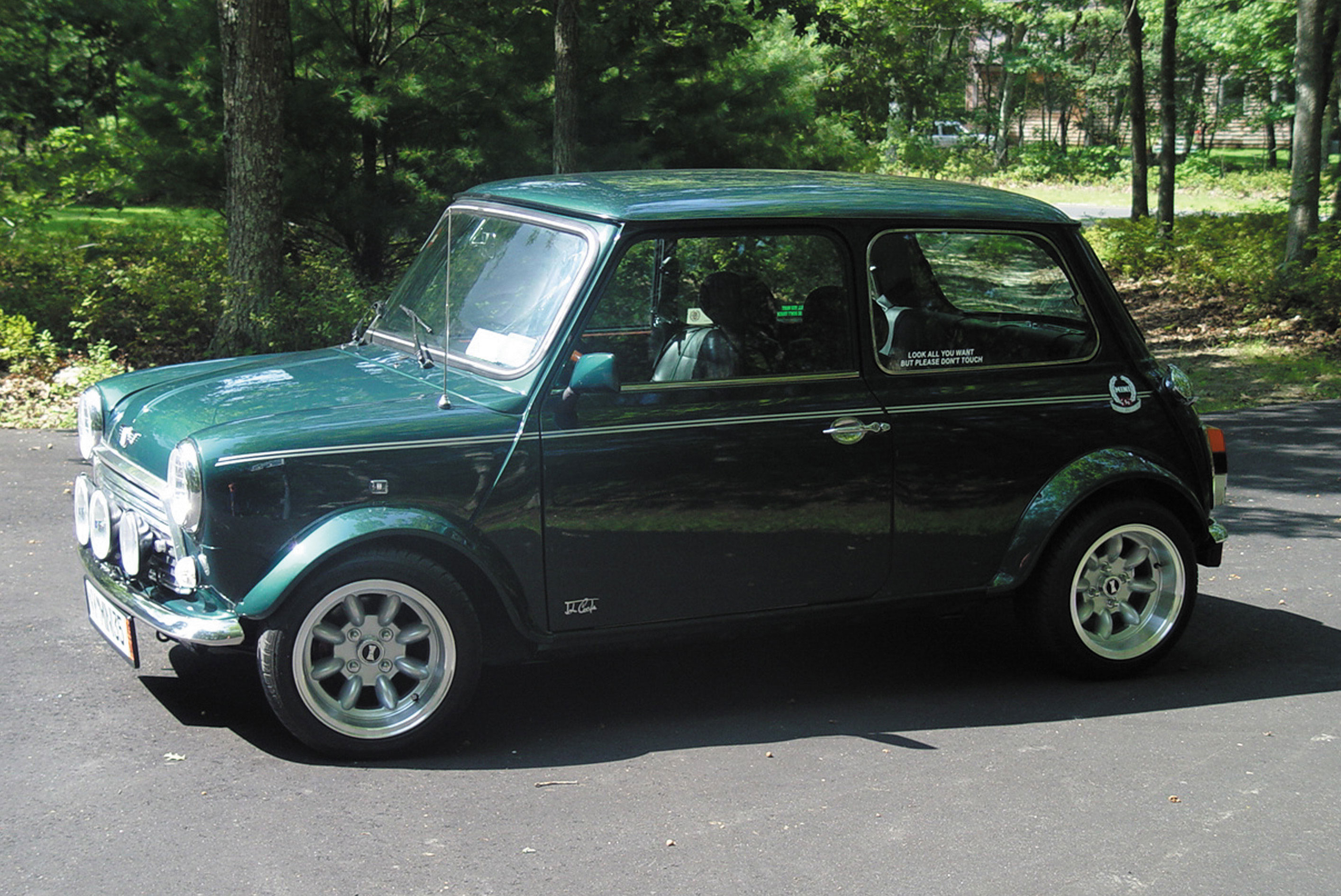
Mini 35 (Germany)

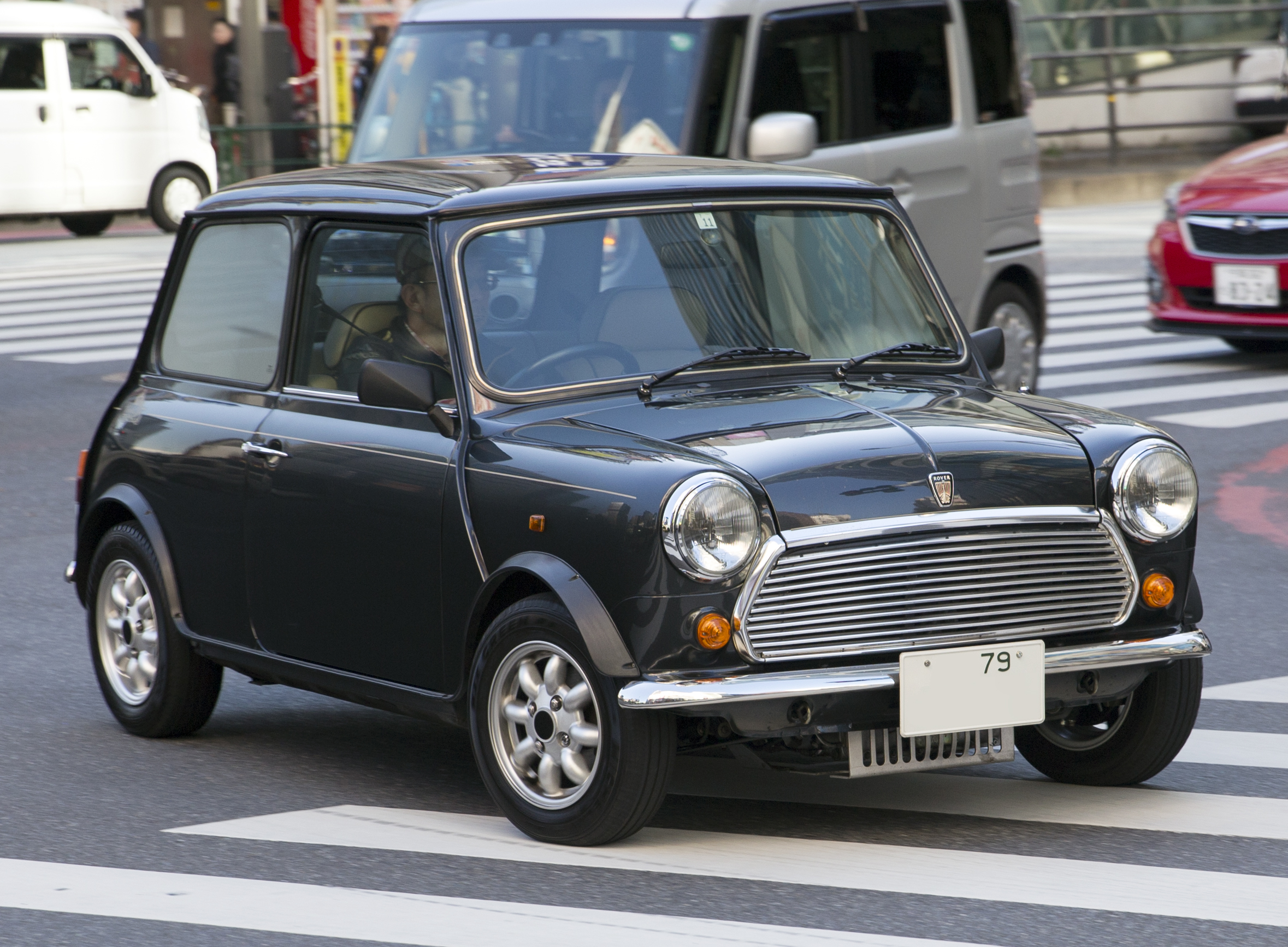
Mini Classic 35 (Japan)

=== Mini 40 ===
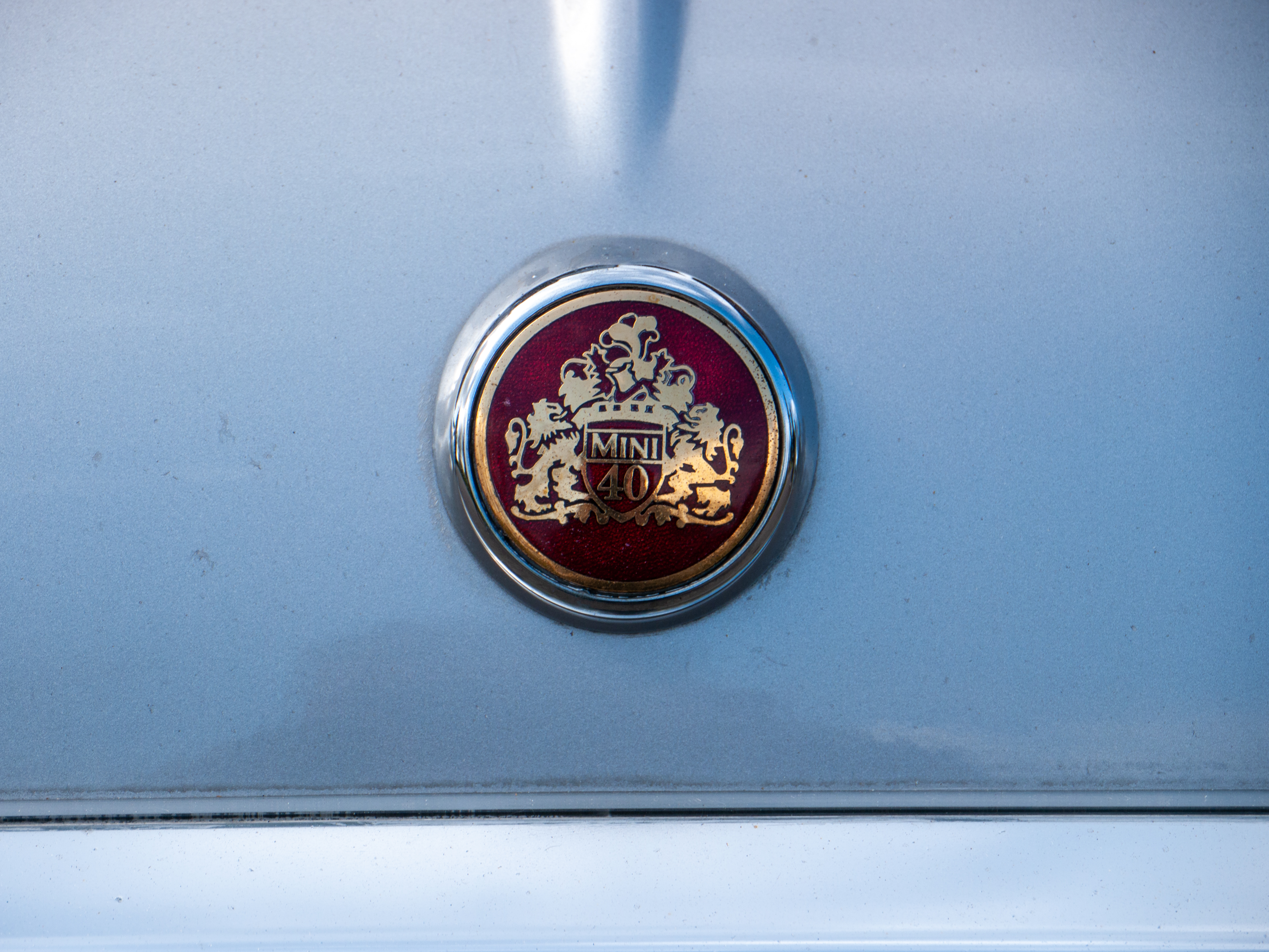
Mini 40 badge

- Year: 1999 (April)
- Based on: Mini Cooper S
- Engine: 1,275 cc MPi (Multi-Point Injection) and SPi (Single-Point Injection) for Japan
- Exterior colours:
  - Island Blue (JFU)
  - Mulberry Red (CDM)
  - Old English White (NNX)
  - Platinum silver (MNX)
  - Solar red (EDM)
  - Brooklands Green (HME)
  - Black (PMF)
- Exterior trim: Chrome bumpers, grille, and handles. Optional Webasto electric sunroof.
- Decals/badges: Gold or black "Mini 40" bonnet badge, anniversary decal on the body sides, chrome "GB" on boot
- Interior: Color-matched leather seats with contrasting piping, alloy dashboard, chrome-detailed instruments with "Mini 40" between the water temp. and fuel gauge, and a leather facia top, handbrake, and gear knob.
- Equipment: CD Player, 13-inch Sportspack wheels, Sportspack arches, twin spotlamps, adjustable headlights
- Production: 800 models, 400 for UK and Japan, the rest for the Europe.

== London Collection ==
=== Mini Ritz ===
- Year: 1985 (January)
- Based on: Mini City
- Engine: 998 cc
- Exterior colour:
  - Silver Leaf(MME - BLVC421)
- Exterior trim: Chrome, black-centered grille
- Decals/badges: Red stripes with "Ritz" logos
- Interior: Claret Red, Prussian Blue and Osprey Grey velvet
- Equipment: 12-inch alloy wheels. 145/70R12 Pirelli Cinturato CN54 tyres
- Production: 2,000 for UK, 1,725 for export from Italy

=== Mini Chelsea ===
- Year: 1985 (February)
- Based on: Mini City
- Engine: 998 cc
- Exterior colours:
  - Targa Red (CNE - BLVC641)
  - Silver Leaf (Japan) (MME - BLVC421)
- Exterior trim: Grey bumpers and door handles
- Decals/badges: Silver and red coachlines with "Chelsea" logos
- Interior: Osprey Grey with red piping
- Equipment: 12-inch alloy wheels, 14570R12 Pirelli Cinturato CN54, and opening rear side windows
- Production: 1,500 for UK, more exported

Produced after the supply of Mini Ritz's had been sold.

=== Mini Piccadilly ===
- Year: 1986 (May)
- Based: Mini City
- Engine: 998 cc
- Exterior colour:
  - Cashmere Gold Metallic (GMD - BLVC422)
- Exterior trim: Black bumpers, black-centred grille
- Decals/badges: Twin coachlines with "Piccadilly" logo
- Interior: Bitter Chocolate, Coffee and Claret velvet
- Equipment: Full-width wheel trims, 14570R12 Pirelli Cinturato CN54, push button radio
- Production: 2,500

Many examples were exported to France and Japan.

=== Mini Park Lane ===
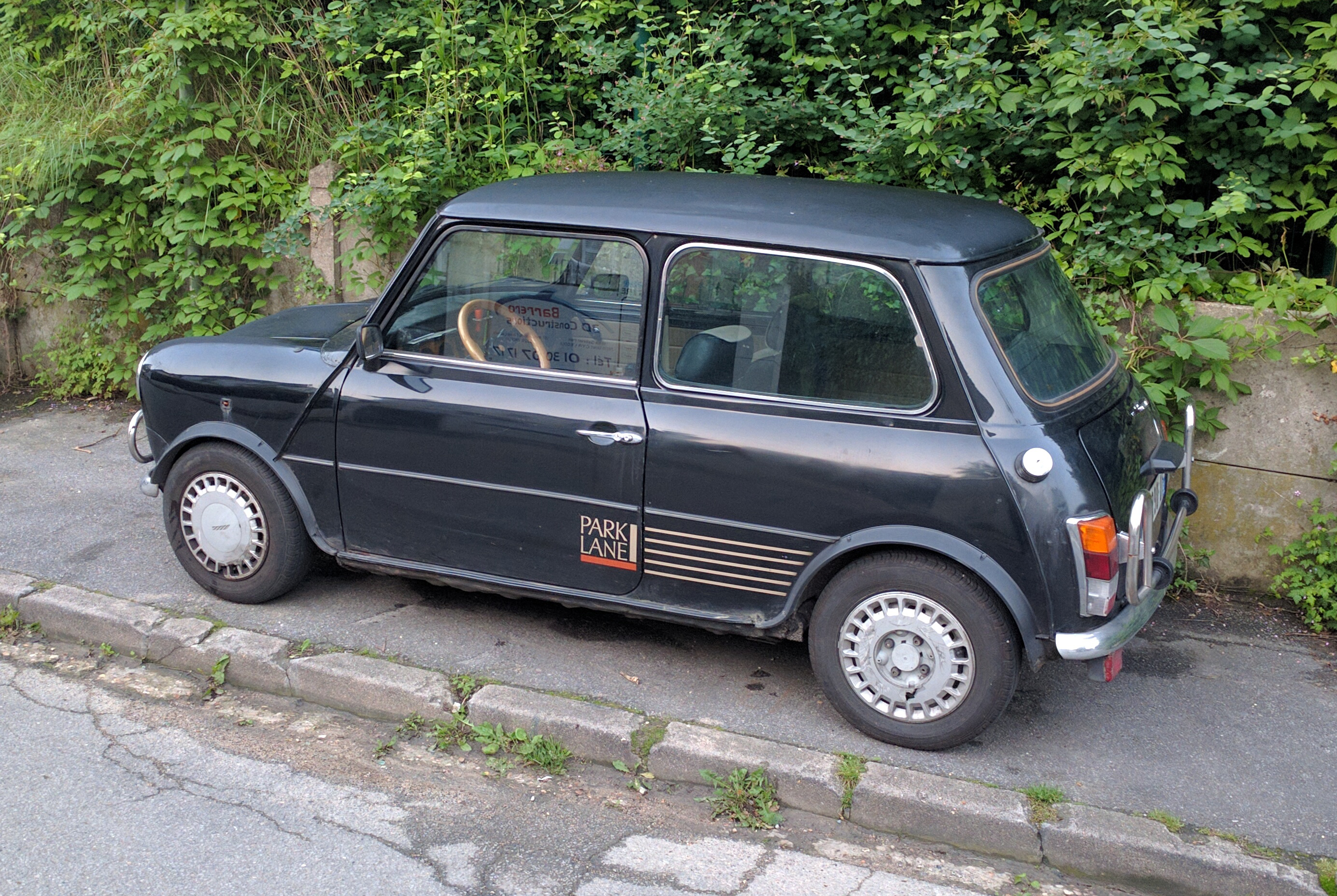
Mini Park Lane

- Year: 1987 (January)
- Based: Mini City
- Engine: 998 cc
- Exterior colour:
  - Black (PMA - BLVC90)
- Exterior trim: Chrome bumpers and grille surround
- Decals/badges: 'Park Lane' logos on doors and bootlid, stripes on rear side panels
- Interior: Beige/Black velvet
- Equipment: Full width wheel trims, tinted windows, opening side windows, stereo radio cassette
- Tyres: 145/70R12 Pirelli Cinturato CN54
- Production: 4,000 (1,500 for UK, 700 for Japan)

=== Mini Advantage ===
- Also known as: Mini Masters (Germany)
- Year: 1987 (June)
- Based on: Mini Mayfair
- Engine: 998 cc
- Exterior colour:
  - Diamond White (NMN - BLVC655)
- Exterior trim: Grey bumpers and door handles; black door mirrors; white wheel covers for the 12-inch steel wheels; Nimbus grey plastic wheel arch extensions and sill finishers
- Decals/badges: Tennis-net theme on lower body sides with "Advantage" script logo; Advantage logo on upper right of bootlid
- Interior: Flint Grey and Jade Green "Tennis Net" cloth on seats and door panels
- Equipment: Tachometer, radio-cassette, tinted glass, opening rear windows with chrome surround
- Production: 4,675 (2,500 for UK)

First launched in France in May 1987 to coincide with the French Open, the Mini Advantage also appeared in the UK in June of that year to be available during The Championships, Wimbledon. Originally the name was to be the Mini Wimbledon, to match the London theme of the other names, but the All England Lawn Tennis Association would not allow this use of name with a tennis themed styling.

== Colours ==
=== Mini Red Hot ===
- Year: 1988 (January)
- Based on: Mini City
- Engine: 998 cc
- Exterior colour:
  - GPO Red (CNL – BLVC 1073)
- Exterior trim: Chrome bumpers and grille surround
- Decals/badges: Black coachline and 'Red Hot' logos
- Interior: Black velour
- Equipment: Full width wheel trims, 14570R12 Pirelli Cinturato CN54, opening side windows, tinted glass, push button radio
- Production: ~3,000 (~1,000 for UK)

=== Mini Jet Black ===
- Year: 1988 (January)
- Based on: Mini City
- Engine: 998 cc
- Exterior colour:
  - Black
- Exterior trim: Chrome bumpers and grille surround
- Decals/badges: Red coachline and 'Jet Black' logos
- Interior: Black velour
- Equipment: Full width wheel trims, 14570R12 Pirelli Cinturato CN54, opening side windows, tinted glass, push button radio
- Production: 3,000 (1,000 for UK)

=== Mini Rose ===
- Year: 1989 (January)
- Based on: Mini City
- Engine: 998 cc
- Exterior colour:
  - White (NAL or BLVC 1218) with Pastel Pink (DME)roof
- Exterior trim: Grey bumpers, wheelarches and grille center
- Decals/badges: Coachlines with 'Rose' logo
- Interior: Pink and Blue 'Crayons' fabric
- Equipment: Full-width white wheeltrims, 14570R12 Pirelli Cinturato CN54, radio cassette
- Production: 500

This 1960s theme was introduced in preparation for the Mini's 30th birthday.

=== Mini Sky ===
- Year: 1989 (January)
- Based on: Mini City
- Engine: 998 cc
- Exterior colour:
  - White (NAL or BLVC 1218) with Pastel Blue (JQN) roof
- Exterior trim: Grey bumpers, wheelarches and grille center
- Decals/badges: Coachlines with 'Sky' logo
- Interior: Pink and Blue 'Crayons' fabric
- Equipment: Full-width white wheeltrims, 14570R12 Pirelli Cinturato CN54, radio cassette
- Production: 500

This 1960s theme was introduced in preparation for the Mini's 30th birthday.

=== Mini Racing ===
- Year: 1988 (January)
- Based on: Mini City
- Engine: 998 cc
- Exterior colour:
  - BRG Metallic (HAF - BLVC617) with white roof
- Exterior trim: Chrome bumpers and black grille center
- Decals/badges: Coachlines with 'Racing' logo
- Interior: Black 'Crayons' fabric
- Equipment: Full-width white wheeltrims, 14570R12 Pirelli Cinturato CN54, radio cassette
- Production: 1,000

Some Mini Racing cars were fitted with the John Cooper 998 conversion. Otherwise, the 'Racing' was identical to the 'Flame' apart from the colour.

=== Mini Flame ===
- Year: 1989 (January)
- Based on: Mini City
- Engine: 998 cc
- Exterior colour:
  - Flame Red (COF - BLVC818) with white roof
- Exterior trim: Chrome bumpers and black grille center
- Decals/badges: Coachlines with 'Flame' logo
- Interior: Black 'Crayons' fabric
- Equipment: Full-width white wheeltrims, radio cassette
- Tyres: 14570R12 Pirelli Cinturato CN54
- Production: 1,000

Apart from the color, the 'Flame' was identical to the 'Racing'.

=== Mini Racing Green ===
- Year: 1989 (April) to 1990 (February)
- Based on: Mini City
- Engine: 998 cc
- Exterior colour:
  - BRG Metallic (HMN) with white roof
- Exterior trim: Chrome bumpers and grille
- Decals/badges: Coachlines with 'Racing' logo
- Interior: Black 'Crayons' fabric
- Equipment: Three-instrument binnacle, R361 Radio Cassette, option of automatic gearbox
- Tyres: 145/70R12 Pirelli Cinturato CN54
- Production: 2,500 for UK (total for Racing Green, Flame Red & Checkmate), more exported

Fitted with a 3.44 final drive (as was found in the original 1961 Cooper), the 'Racing Green' could be bought with the Rover-approved John Cooper performance kit. Identical to the 'Flame Red' and 'Checkmate' apart from the color.

=== Mini Flame Red ===
- Year: 1990 (February)
- Based on: Mini City
- Engine: 998 cc
- Exterior colour:
  - Flame Red (COF - BLVC818)
- Exterior trim: Chrome bumpers and black grille with chrome surrounds
- Decals/badges: Coachlines with 'Racing' logo
- Interior: Black 'Crayons' fabric
- Equipment: Three-instrument binnacle, R361 Radio Cassette, option of automatic gearbox
- Tyres: 145/70R12 Pirelli Cinturato CN54
- Production: 2,500 for UK (total for Racing Green, Flame Red, and Check Mate), more exported

Fitted with a 3.44 final drive (as was found in the original 1961 Cooper), the 'Flame Red' could be bought with the Rover-approved John Cooper performance kit. Identical to the 'Racing Green' and 'Checkmate' apart from the colour.

=== Mini Checkmate ===
- Year: 1990 (February)
- Based on: Mini City
- Engine: 998 cc
- Exterior colour:
  - Black (PMA - BLVC90)
- Exterior trim: Chrome bumpers, Black grille, Minilite alloy wheels
- Decals/badges: Coachlines with 'Checkmate' logo
- Interior: Black 'Crayons' fabric
- Equipment: Three-instrument binnacle, R361 Radio Cassette, option of automatic gearbox
- Tyres: 145/70R12 Pirelli Cinturato CN54
- Production: 2,500 for UK (total for Racing Green, Flame Red, and Checkmate), more exported

Fitted with a 3.44 final drive (as was found in the original 1961 Cooper), the Checkmate could be bought with the Rover-approved John Cooper performance kit. Identical to the 'Racing Green' and 'Flame Red' apart from the colour.

== Designer ==
=== Mini Designer ===
- Year: 1988 (June)
- Based on: Mini City
- Engine: 998 cc
- Exterior colour:
  - White (NMF - BLVC449)
  - Black (PMA - BLVC90)
- Exterior trim: Nimbus grey
- Decals/badges: Twin coachlines and "Designer" logos on the rear side panels and bootlid
- Interior: Black and white striped fabric with ‘Mary Quant’ signatures embossed.
- Equipment: Tinted glass, opening rear side windows, leather-rim steering wheel and two vanity mirrors in the sun visors, 14570R12 Pirelli Cinturato CN54
- Production: 2,000

The Mini Designer was often called the "Quant" in reference to the Mary Quant-designed interior and Quant Daisy motifs on the steering wheel and bonnet badge.

=== Mini Paul Smith ===
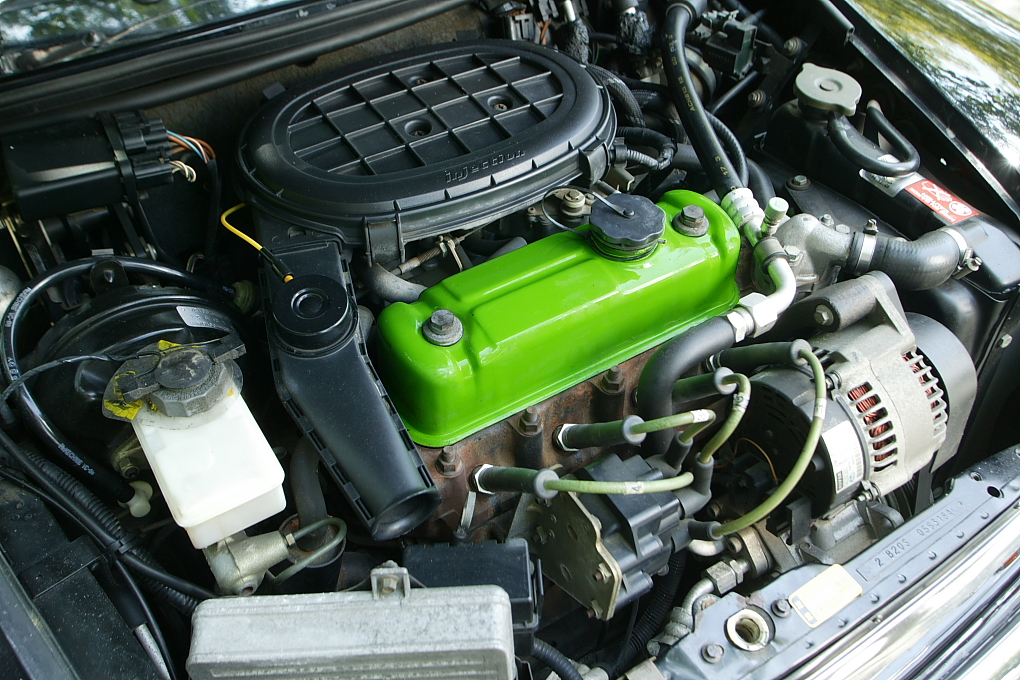
Mini Paul Smith engine, with signature green-painted rocker cover

- Year: 1998 (March)
- Based on: Mini Cooper
- Engine: 1,275 cc
- Exterior colour:
  - Paul Smith Blue (JFL - BLVC1269)
  - Also available in Black and White (Japanese market)
- Exterior trim: Chrome grille, handles, and bumpers; green Great Britain isle badge on grille
- Decals/badges: 24ct gold enamelled "Paul Smith" bonnet badge, Paul Smith rear window sticker
- Interior: Black leather trim, Paul Smith-scripted instrument graphics; Citrus Green glovebox interior, petrol tank and solid boot liner.
- Equipment: Charcoal grey Minilite alloy wheels, 145/70R12 Pirelli Cinturato CN54, two spotlamps, Special "Paul Smith" denim jack & tool bag
- Production: 300 for UK, 1,500 for rest of world

Paul Smith also designed a one-off Mini with 86 different-coloured stripes.

== Cooper ==
=== Mini Cooper RSP ===
- Year: 1990 (September)
- Based on: Mini 30
- Engine: 1,275 cc
- Exterior colour:
  - Flame Red (CPQ - BLVC1000)
  - Black (PMF - BLVC644)
  - British Racing Green (HAF - BLVC617)
- Exterior trim: Chrome Grille and bumpers, body-colored door mirrors and wheel arches
- Decals/badges: White bonnet stripes with John Cooper signatures, Cooper badges
- Interior: Black leather seat inserts, leather-bound steering wheel, red carpets
- Equipment: Sunroof, twin driving lamps, tinted glass, alloy Minilite-style wheels, 145/70R12 Pirelli Cinturato CN54, Oil Cooler
- Production: 1,050 for UK, 650 for Japan

The RSP (Rover Special Products) was the first Cooper in 21 years and the first Mini with a 1,275cc engine in 10 years. The most powerful carburettor engine (with the S works conversion) and the only non-Works Mini fitted with an oil cooler as standard.

It was an instant success and sold out even before cars began to appear in showrooms which prompted Rover to put the Cooper in full-time production a year later.

=== Mini Cooper Monte Carlo ===
- Year: 1994 (January and July)
- Based on: Mini Cooper 1.3i
- Engine: 1,275 cc. The engine number on the UK cars is prefixed with 12A2EJ66 and the Japanese cars were prefixed with 12A2EJ77, though there is evidence that some have 12A2EJ34, same as the later Cooper 35 LE.
- Exterior colour:
  - Flame Red (CPQ - BLVC1000)
  - Black (PMF - BLVC644)
- Exterior trim:
- Decals/badges: "John Cooper" signature decals, coachline with Monte Carlo decals
- Interior: Wooden dashboard, red vinyl seats with cream cloth center panels, red seat belts, red carpets, red leather steering wheel, gear knob, and gaiter
- Equipment: Gunmetal Minilite-style alloy wheels, 1457012 Pirelli Cinturato CN54, four fog lamps
- Production: 200 for UK, 1000 for Japan.

The 1994 Monte Carlo was released to celebrate Paddy Hopkirk's return to the Monte Carlo Rally, 30 years after his original win.

=== Mini Cooper Grand Prix ===
- Year: 1994 (August) - December 1996
- Based on: Mini Cooper
- Engine: 1,275 cc
- Exterior colour: All available Rover Mini Cooper colors
- Exterior trim: Chrome grille, handles and locks
- Decals/badges: Coachlines with Grand Prix decals
- Interior: Leather trim for doors, leather steering wheel and upholstery, glovebox-mounted plaque, walnut 6-gauge dash, door cappings and door pulls
- Equipment: Koni adjustable dampers, four driving lamps, stainless sill plates
- Modifications: big-valve, ported, balanced and flowed cylinder head, special cam and valve rocker assemblies, Weber Alpha fuel injection (except for the last few, which had a remapped Rover ECU), catalyzed Janspeed exhaust, revised air filter, oil cooler
- Production: 35

Only two of the Grand Prix cars were made in a left-hand-drive configuration. The engine produced 86 hp.

=== Mini Cooper 35 ===
- Year: 1996 (May)
- Based on: Mini Cooper
- Engine: 1,275 cc single point fuel injection. The engine number on the UK cars is prefixed with 12A2EJ66 and the Japanese cars were prefixed with 12A2EJ34. These engine prefixes were shared with the 1994 Monte Carlo LE and is one of the key identifiers of a genuine Cooper 35 LE.
- Exterior colour:
  - Almond Green (HAK - BLVC1212) with Diamond White roof (NMN - BLVC655) UK and Japan
  - Flame Red (RDV) with Diamond White roof (NMN - BLVC655) option for Japan only.
- Exterior trim: Body-coloured door mirrors and wheel arches. Some Japanese green and red cars had white door mirrors. Some red cars had black plastic wheel arches.
- Decals/badges: Coach lines with "Mini Cooper 1961-1996 Anniversary Edition" decals on sides and boot lid. 1.3i boot badges on UK cars and A panels on Japanese cars (some UK cars left the factory with A panel badges).
- Interior: Almond Green cars had Porcelain Green leather seats with embossed Cooper logos; matching leather steering wheel and gear knob; "Anniversary" badge on steering wheel; wooden dash with cream-faced dials. Flame Red cars had Black leather seats with embossed Cooper logos; red leather steering wheel and gear knob; "Anniversary" badge on steering wheel; wooden dash with cream-faced dials but with no clock, the Japanese cars have air conditioning vents where the clock would be.
- Equipment: UK cars - Gunmetal grey centred Minilite-style 4.5x12-inch alloy wheels with silver outer rims, two spotlights, two fog lamps. Japanese cars - silver alloy wheels and four fog type lamps instead of two spotlights & two foglamps of the UK model. All Japanese cars had factory fitted Air Conditioning, no alarm or immobiliser.
- Tyres: 14570R12 Pirelli Cinturato CN54
- Production: 200 for the UK market (5 of which received official John Cooper Garages S specification), 1501 were manufactured for Japan, the first (used in Rover's Japanese launch brochure) remained in the UK. Japanese cars featured air conditioning as standard, fixed rear quarterlights, and four fog style lamps (but still functioning as spot and fog). Rover Japan sources have said that no more than 10% of the Japanese cars were sold in Flame Red. Both the green and red Japanese models were available with the option of an automatic gearbox, something that was not available on the UK market cars.

The five, John Cooper S specification Cooper 35 produced 86 hp. The conversion consisted of a replacement cylinder head, 1.5 roller rockers, Janspeed exhaust, K&N air filter element and modifications to the injection system. An oil cooler was also fitted.

These cars had the roof resprayed in Old English White with matching painted on bonnet stripes which run over the scuttle panel as a tribute to the Cooper Car Co racing cars. Badging was updated with red enamelled Cooper inserts on the winged bonnet and boot badges, and the 1.3i badge on the boot lid was replaced by a Si badge. The original side graphics were retained.

They also had a unique dashboard and matching door capping's in elm rather than the walnut which featured on the factory car, and three signed ivory auxiliary dials were added, clock, voltmeter and oil pressure, rather than just a clock on the standard car. Alloy door furniture was fitted, signed on some cars, but not all as the door furniture was redesigned around this time. A steering drop bracket was also standard on the Si. The factory steering wheel and gear knob was retained.

Externally, in addition to the changes already highlighted, the Si gained clear indicator lenses, and polished metal Cooper wheel centre badges.

Only four of the five John Cooper S specification Cooper 35's still exist.

A number of cars were subsequently converted to S specification by John Cooper Garages, and the S pack cars can be distinguished from the original five cars by a plaque stating conversion number rather than car number.

=== Mini Cooper Sports LE ===
- Year: 1998 (May)
- Based on: Mini Cooper
- Engine: 1,275 cc
- Exterior colours:
  - Brooklands Green (HFB - BLVC1265)
  - Black (PMF - BLVC644)
  - Roof: White
- Exterior trim: Chrome grille and handles; white mirrors
- Decals/badges: Twin coachlines with BMC-style rosette with the words "Mini Cooper" to the rear; "V" flash in yellow (similar to British Vita Logo) above the front side indicator; BMC-style rosette with the words "Mini Cooper" on the right hand side of boot lid; white bonnet stripes
- Equipment: Two spotlamps, sports suspension pack, 13x6-inch Sportspack wheels, Sportspack wheelarches
- Interior: Walnut dashboard; dark green leather interior; green carpets; dark green leather and black steering wheel; dark green leather gear change boot and knob
- Production: 100 (50 of each colour); there is some doubt that the production color split was not even and that more green than black cars were produced.

Built to commemorate the 30th anniversary of the Cooper's victory in four Saloon Car Championship races in 1968.

=== Mini Cooper S Touring ===
- Year: 1997
- Based on: Mini Cooper
- Engine: 1,275 cc
- Exterior trim: Stainless steel sill covers, alloy fuel flap, Cooper valve caps
- Decals/badges: "Cooper S Touring" side decals, "Si" boot badge, John Cooper chassis plate under front seat
- Interior: Leather steering wheel, walnut dashboard and door cappings, alloy door handles
- Equipment:

On the Cooper S Touring, the Jack Knight 5-speed gearbox was available as an optional extra.

=== Mini Cooper S Sport 5 ===
- Year: 1997
- Based on: Mini Cooper
- Engine: 1,275 cc
- Exterior trim: Chrome bumpers and grille
- Decals/badges: Cooper S Sport 5 decals
- Interior trim: Leather gear knob
- Equipment: 13x6-inch Rover Sportspack alloy wheels, Sportspack wheelarches, 2 auxiliary driving lamps
- Production: 30 - 50 No official records kept
- Options:
  - Leather interior
  - Electric sunroof

The Sport 5 was very similar to the Cooper S Touring except that it was offered with the five-speed Jack Knight gearbox as standard.

=== Mini Cooper S Works ===
- Year: 1999 (March)
- Based on: Mini Cooper (John Cooper LE 40 Edition)
- Engine: 1,380 cc
- Exterior colour:
  - Brooklands Green
  - Roof: Old English White
- Exterior trim: Chrome grille, door handles and bumpers
- Decals/badges: Coachlines with "S works" decals. Special red-winged badges front and back.
- Interior: Alloy dashboard, door cappings, door furniture, and foot pedals; leather steering wheel and gear knob
- Equipment: CD player, 12-inch alloy wheels

14570R12

- Production: 51, demand was so high that production increased from the original 25 (which have unique no. 1/25 edition plates on their dash glovebox). The 51st was unique with added extras as made specifically for Mrs John Cooper and sold at auction for 47,465.10 GBP at the Retromobile by Artcurial Motorcar in Paris 2016. All were converted by John Cooper Garages in Sussex from Mini John Cooper LE 40's
- Options:
  - Jack Knight 5-speed gearbox
  - Sportspack

With 90 hp output from its big-valve high-compression engine, the S Works is the most powerful Cooper ever made.

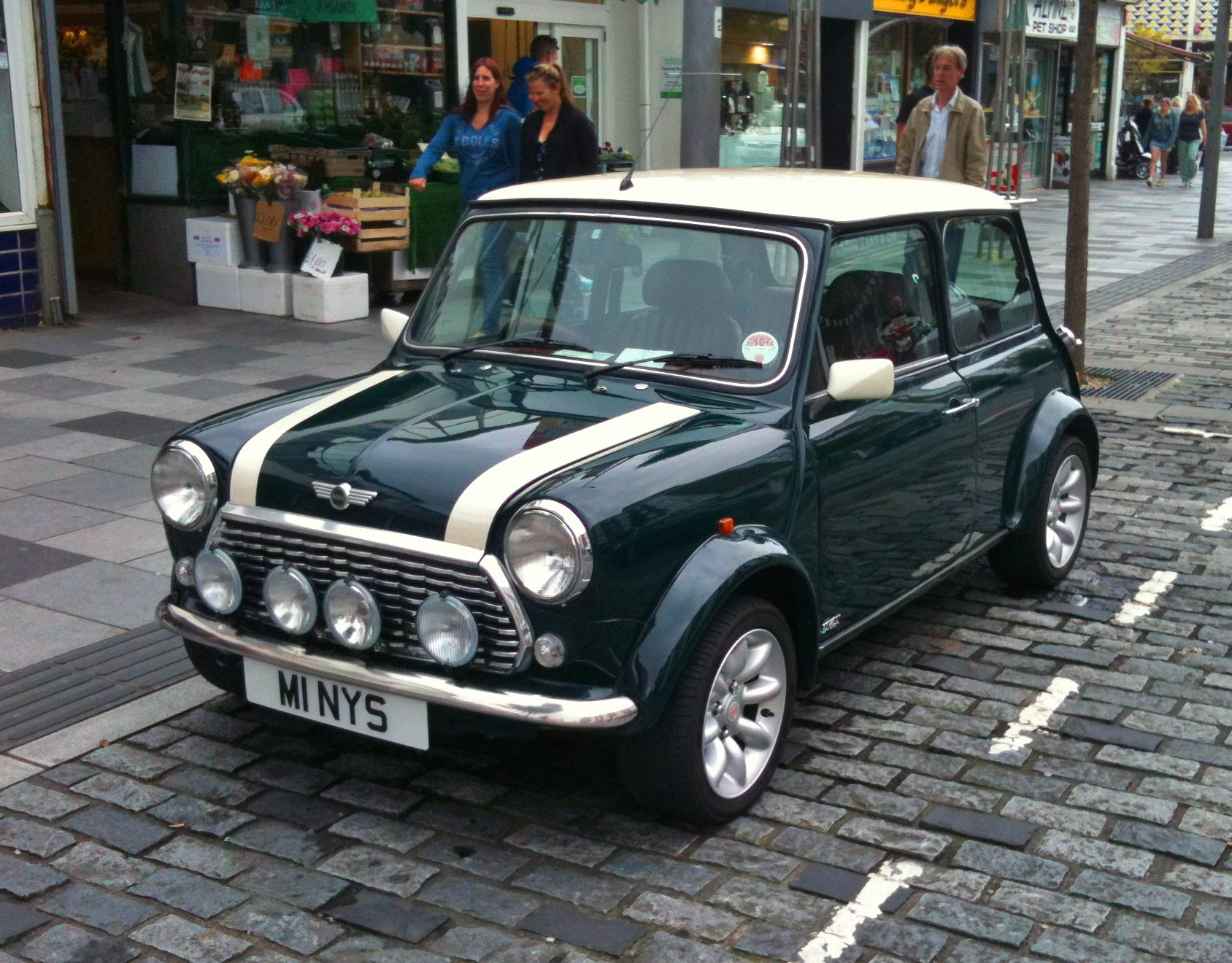
Mini John Cooper Limited Edition.

=== 'Mini' John Cooper LE 40 ===
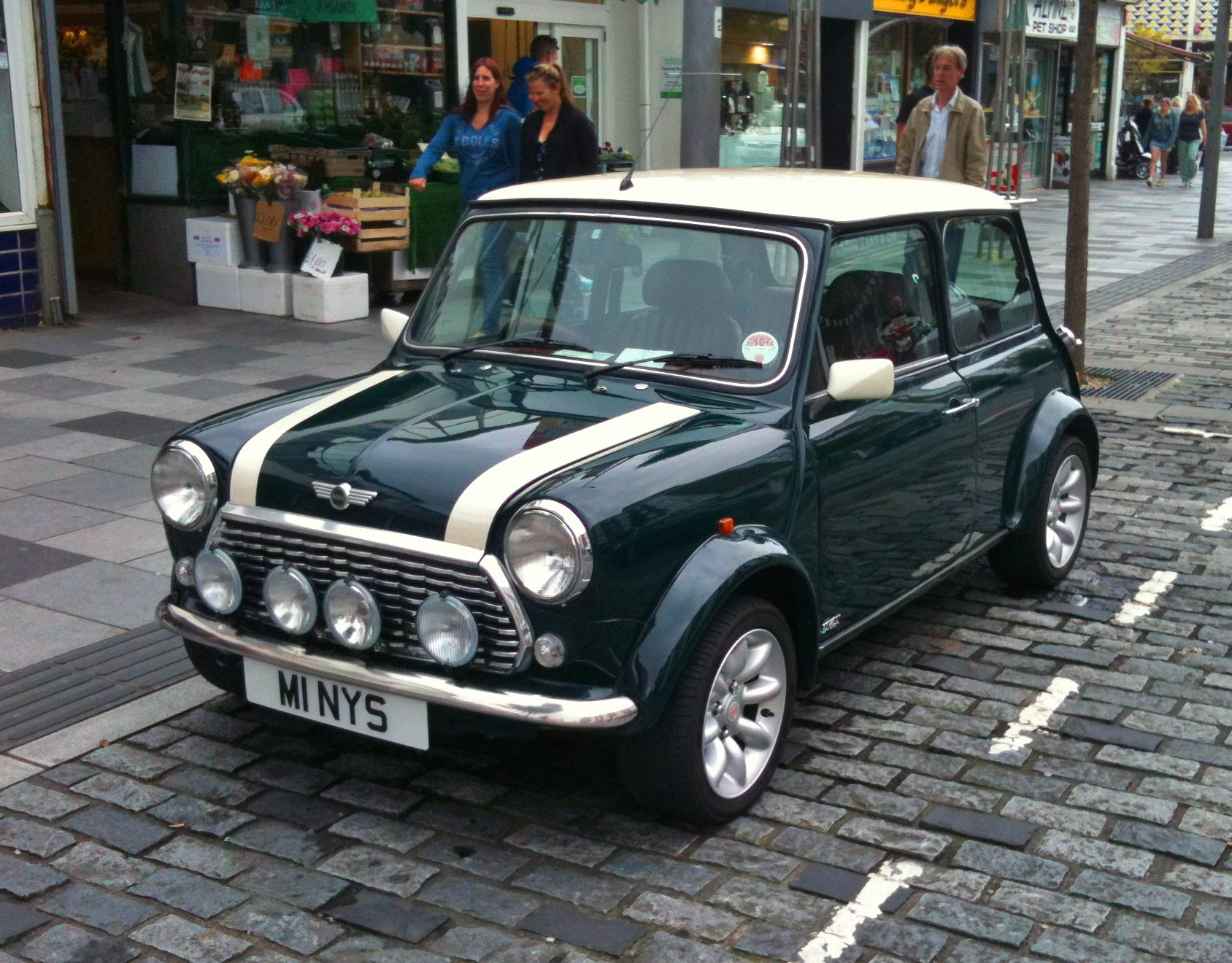
Mini John Cooper Limited Edition.

- Year: 1999 (August)
- Based on: Mini Cooper
- Engine: 1,275 cc
- Exterior colour:
  - Brooklands Green (HFB - BLVC1265)
  - Roof: Old English White (NNX - BLVC1205)
- Exterior trim: Chrome bumpers, grille, and handles
- Interior: Grenadine red leather upholstery (with black piping for seats) on dash top, door liners, gear gaiter, and door pockets; red carpeting; black leather steering wheel, handbrake grip and gear knob; alloy dashboard
- Decals/badges: John Cooper signature in chrome-plated steel.
- Equipment: 13-inch Sportspack alloy wheels, Sportspack arches, two spotlamps, CD player
- Production: 301 (51 converted to Mini Cooper S Works) officially only sold in UK as RHD

Built to commemorate the 40th anniversary of Cooper's victory in the Formula One World Championships 1959 & 1960. The Le 40 Editions were the most Expensive Minis ever sold as standard from the Factory. Also the only Mini not to registered as a Mini, instead as only 'John Cooper LE 40'

=== Mini Cooper Sport 500 ===
- Year: 2000
- Based on: Mini Cooper
- Engine: 1,275 cc
- Exterior colours:
  - Tahiti Blue (JRJ - BLVC965)
  - Anthracite (LQW - BLVC1266)
  - Solar Red (CMU - BLVC1278)
  - British Racing Green (HAF - BLVC617)
  - Roof: silver
- Exterior trim: Chrome bumpers and grille, silver bonnet stripes
- Interior: Black and silver leather; alloy gear knob
- Equipment: Four spotlamps, 13-inch alloy wheels, certificate signed by John Cooper, plaque inside glovebox, high level brake light
- Production: 500 - Last ever to classic Issigonis design.

== Export-only ==
=== Mini After Eight ===
- Market: France / Spain / Portugal
- Year: 1991
- Engine: 998 cc
- Exterior colour:
  - BRG
- Exterior trim: Chrome bumpers and door handles; black mirrors and grille
- Decals/badges: "After Eight" script on rear wing
- Interior: Velvet seat covering
- Equipment: 12-inch steel wheels with full wheel covers, 14570R12 Pirelli Cinturato CN54, front head restraints
- Production: 1,500

This trim package adopted the branding of the After Eight chocolate mint in a partnership with its manufacturer, Rowntree & Company (then owned by Nestlé).

=== Mini Belfast ===
- Market: Japan
- Year: 1988

=== Mini Blue Star ===
- Market: Germany
- Year: 1996
- Engine: 1,275 cc
- Exterior colour:
  - Tahiti Blue Metallic (JRJ)
- Exterior trim: Body-colored wheel arches
- Decals/badges: Coachlines with "Blue Star" script decals
- Interior: Full blue leather seats with gray piping; elm dashboard, door cappings, door pulls, steering wheel, gear knob, and handbrake grip; blue leather gaiter; Magnolia instruments; black carpets
- Equipment: 13x6 alloy "Sportspack" wheels, "German" wheel arches, twin spotlamps
- Production: 500

The steering wheel used in the Blue Star is a RAID model 13D.

=== Mini Brighton ===
- Market: Japan
- Year: 1988

=== Mini Brooklands ===
- Market: Germany
- Year: 1998
- Engine: 1,275 cc
- Colour: RNE
  - Exterior: Charcoal, also called Niagara or Charcoal Black (LVD 1207)
  - Roof: White Diamond (NAL 1218)
  - Other colour details: white bonnet stripes, white side-mirrors, white coachlines with "Brooklands" decals on sides.
- Equipment: Koni dampers, Rover Sport Pack 13×6 inch wheels, Rover Sport Pack wheel arches, two beam lights and two fog lights in front of grill, rear fog light.
- Interior: black leather seats with cream piping and Cooper logos, black leather steering wheel, black leather gear knob, walnut dashboard, Cooper chrome instrument panel showing speed, fuel, water temp, oil temp, voltage and clock, alloy gas pedal.
- Production: 600

=== Mini Cooper Serie 300 ===
- Market: Italy, France, Germany, Netherlands, Belgium, Luxembourg
- Year: 1975
- Based on: Innocenti Mini Cooper 1300 Export (MK III)
- Engine: 1,275 cc
- Exterior colour:
  - Beaver (Castoro), white roof
  - Black, white roof
  - Bluette, white roof
  - Green, black roof
  - Lobster (Aragosta), black roof
  - Night Blue, white roof
  - Peach (Pesca), black roof
  - Red, black Roof
  - White Ivory, black roof
- Exterior trim: light-green tinted windscreens, black colored front and rear bumpers, roof drains without drip rails
- Equipment: Britax-Sabelt sunroof, black plastic wheel arches, 4.5x10 inches Rostyle rims
- Interior: 36 centimeters Hellebore steering wheel, all-cloth interior, lowered rear storage compartments
- Production: ~300 (between 300 and 399)

This car, also called “Last 300 Series” or “Super Cooper” is known as the last Italian classic Mini as the Innocenti production ended with this limited-edition model. Originally fitted to counter the competition of the just launched Mini 90 (introduced in the same year), it is now considered as one of the highest-quality and best-finished Minis of all time.

=== Mini Cosmopolitan ===
- Market: France
- Year: 1993
- Engine: 1,275 cc
- Exterior colour:
  - Black
- Exterior trim: Black grille and mirrors; chrome bumpers
- Decals/badges: "Cosmopolitan" text on rear wing
- Interior: Fabric-covered seats and door panels
- Equipment: Philips CD player
- Production: 1,000

=== Mini Jubilee ===
- Name: Mini 1000 Jubilee (5 Years of British Leyland in the Netherlands)
- Market: Netherlands
- Year: 1975
- Build in Spain by AUTHI
- Exterior Colour: Brown with White vinyl roof
- Engine: 998 cc
- Beam Lights build in grill
- Jubilee logo on A-panels. rear quarter panels and bootlid
- Rostyle Wheels
- Production: 1000 cars
- Buyers were eligible to receive a certificate

=== Mini Kensington ===
- Market: Japan, Italy, Netherlands, Belgium, Germany
- Exterior color:
  - Tahiti Blue
  - Surf Blue
  - Nightfire red
  - British Racing Green
  - Whitehall Beige
  - Dark Brown
  - Anthracite Metallic
- Interior: Leather seats
- Equipment: Air conditioning
- Year: 1996–1997

=== Mini Lady ===
- Market: Netherlands, Belgium, Austria
- Year: 1977
- Engine: 998 cc
- Engine: 850 cc
- extra: colour-coded Umbrella
- 200 Cars for the Dutch Market
- full Wooden Dashboard with Lady-badge
- Exterior: Special Blue Striping

=== Mini Lapagayo ===
- Market: Netherlands
- Year: 1998
- Engine: 1,275 cc
- Exterior colour:
  - Tahiti Blue Metallic (JRJ)
- Exterior trim: Chrome grille, bumpers, and door handles; white door mirrors; white fuel filler cap
- Decals/badges: Coachlines with "Mini Cooper" decals; "Lapagayo" striping and logos on lower section of doors
- Interior: Blue leather and yellow Alcantara upholstery; walnut dashboard and gear knob; tinted windows
- Equipment: 12-inch Minilite alloy wheels painted white; two spotlamps; package including polo shirt and umbrella
- Production: 20

Named for the Lapagayo fashion brand.

=== Mini Monza ===
- Market: Germany
- Year: 1998–1999
- Engine: 1,275 cc MPI
- Exterior colour:
  - Tahiti Blue Metallic (JMP - BLVC65)
- Exterior trim: Body-colored Sportpack wheel arches, "Monza" petrol cap.
- Decals/badges: Coachlines with crossed-checkered-flag "Monza" decals; optional silver roof chequers and chequered bonnet stripes.
- Interior: Black leather seats; burl walnut dashboard and door cappings; black carpets; Magnolia instruments with 3 additional Magnolia gauges, leather and wood steering wheel, aluminium and wood gear knob.
- Equipment: 12x5 or optional 13x6 Minilite alloy wheels, Sportspack wheel arches, two spotlamps, two fog lamps and rear fog lamp, chrome exhaust-end
- Production: 250 for Germany, though a few later reimported to GB through Mini Sport.

=== Mini Printemps ===
- Market: France
- Year: 1979
- Engine: 998 cc
- Exterior colour:
  - Beige metallic
- Production: 500

=== Mini S ===
- Market: France
- Year: 1979
- Engine: 998 cc
- Exterior colour:
  - Bleu Nuit
  - Black

=== Mini Silver Bullet ===
- Market: Germany
- Year: 1995
- Engine: 1,275 cc
- Exterior colour:
  - Silver Metallic
- Exterior trim: Body-coloured wheel arches
- Decals/badges: Coachlines with "Silver Bullet" decals
- Interior: Full black leather seats with red piping; elm dashboard, door cappings, door pulls, and gear knob; black leather gaiter; Magnolia instruments; black carpets
- Equipment: 13x6 five-spoke "Revolution" alloy wheels, Sportspack wheel arches, twin spotlamps
- Production: 400 for Germany

The steering wheel used in the Silver Bullet is a RAID model 13D.

=== Mini Silverstone ===
- Market: Germany
- Year: 1993
- Engine: 1,275 cc
- Exterior colour:
  - Black
- Decals/badges: Coachlines and crossed-checkered-flag "Silverstone" decals
- Interior: Leather seat edging with cloth inserts and red piping; birdseye maple dashboard, door cappings, and gear knob; maroon carpets
- Equipment: 6x13 "Revolution" alloy wheels, "German" wheel arches

=== Mini Twinings ===
- Market: France
- Year: 1991
- Engine: 998 cc
- Exterior colour:
  - Black
- Interior: Dove grey with Harlequin fabric
- Equipment:
  - 12-inch steel wheels with full (white) wheel covers
  - Gold "Twinings" decals on the side

=== Mini Woodbury ===
- Market: France
- Year: 1992
- Engine: 1,275 cc
- Exterior colour:
  - Black
- Interior: Beige leather stamped with "Arc de Triomphe"; walnut dashboard
- Equipment: 12-inch steel wheels with full wheel covers
- Production: 500

=== Mini John Player Special ===
- Market: German
- Year: 1980
- Engine: 1000cc
- Exterior colour:
  - Black, Gold Stripe, JPS Decals & Vinyl/Matte Roof.
- Interior: Black Recaro Seats; Walnut dash made by Rokee.
- Equipment: 10-inch Gold ATS Classic wheels, Abarth exhaust system, Leather covered steering wheel.
- Production: Unknown.

== Special ==
=== Mini 1000 'Stripey' LE ===
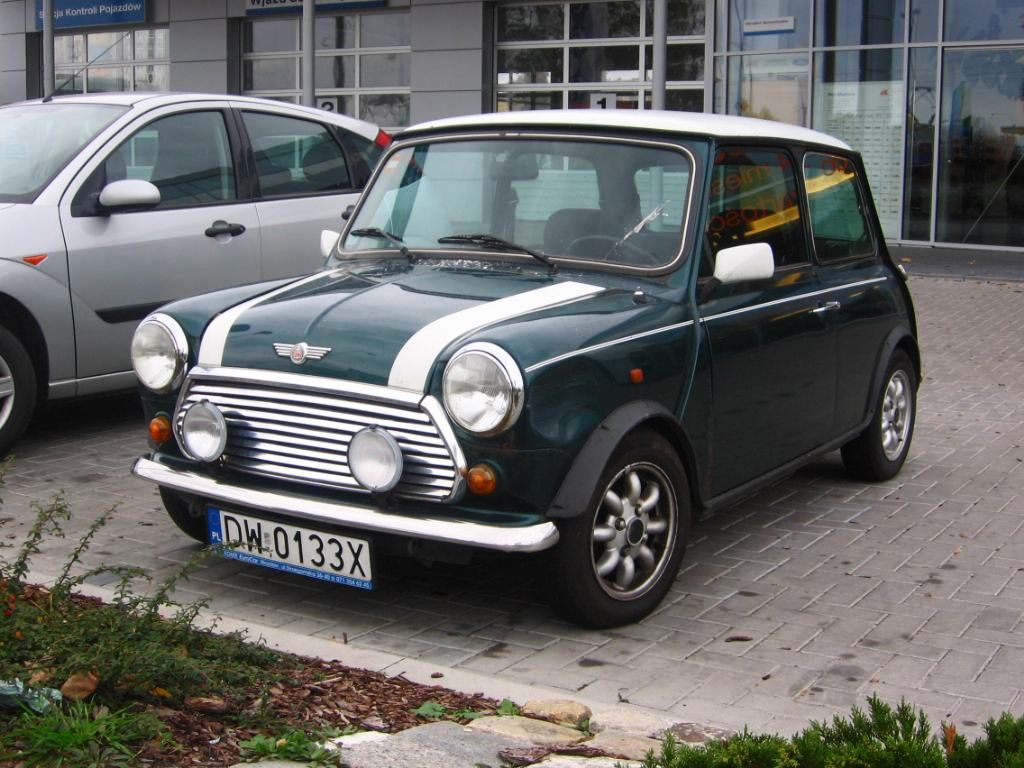
Mini 1000

- Year: 1976 (January)
- Based on: Mini 1000
- Engine: 998 cc
- Exterior colours:
  - Brooklands Green
  - White
- Exterior trim: Chrome, chrome mirrors
- Decals/badges: Gold coachlines
- Interior: Striped orange MGB-style 'deckchair' seats
- Equipment: Reclining seats, face-level vents, two door mirrors
- Production: 3,000

=== Mini 1100 Special ===
- Year: 1979
- Based on: Mini 1000
- Engine: 1098 cc
- Exterior colours:
  - Metallic Silver (MMB - BLVC202)
  - Metallic Rose (CMM - BLVC303)
- Exterior trim: Clubman rear bumpers (fitted to front and rear), black slatted grille, vinyl covered roof
- Decals/badges: Wide shaded side stripes, "Mini" laurel leaf A-panel decals, "Special" grill badge, "Mini 1100" boot badge
- Interior: Tartan check trim, two-spoke steering wheel with "Mini" laurel leaf decal, plastic centre console and plastic passenger side under dash tray (the only production model fitted with a centre console and under dash tray as standard)
- Equipment: Exacton 5x10 inch alloy wheels with plastic centre caps and plastic wheel nut covers, Dunlop Formula 70 165/70x10 tyres, plastic wheel arch extensions (the first production model to use this later ubiquitous design), wing-mounted side indicators (mounted higher on the wings and longer than other Mini models), twin door mirrors, 1275 GT instrumentation and Clubman upper dash facia. MW/LW radio, cigar lighter and clock fitted within the centre console.
- Production: 5,100

Built to celebrate the Mini's 20th anniversary, the 1100 Special was the only round-nose Mini to be supplied with the 1098 cc engine in the UK. British Leyland supplemented the original run of 2,500 cars with an additional 2,600 due to its popularity.

=== Mini 1100 Special (BE-version) ===
- Year: 1976–81
- Based on: Mini 1000 MkIII
- Engine: 1098 cc
- Exterior colours: any Mini colour available
- Exterior trim:
  - before 1979 : wing-mounted side indicators close to wheel arches, twin door mirrors,
  - after 1978 : wing-mounted side indicators (mounted higher on the wings and longer than other Mini models), twin door mirrors, like British special, Clubman rear bumpers (fitted to front and rear), black slatted grille, vinyl covered roof,
- Decals/badges: "Mini Special" boot badge
- Interior:
  - before 1979 : 3 gauge central oval dash
  - after 1978 Tartan check trim, two-spoke steering wheel with "Mini" laurel leaf decal
- Equipment: Exacton 5x10 inch alloy wheels with plastic centre caps and plastic wheel nut covers, Dunlop Formula 70 165/70x10 tyres, plastic wheel arch extensions (the first production model to use this later ubiquitous design),
- Production: unknown in Seneffe

Built between for Belgium market in Seneffe from 1976 to 1978 as an experiment to test demand. The success on the continental market inspired BLMC to launch it, in 1979 for Mini's 20th anniversary, the 1100 Special was the only round-nose Mini to be supplied with the 1098 cc. The model was popular in the Benelux market and somewhat in France.

=== Mini Sprite ===
- Year: 1983 (August)
- Based on: Mini City
- Engine: 998 cc
- Exterior colours:
  - Cinnabar Red (CMT - BLVC399)
  - Primula Yellow (FMP - BLVC442)
- Exterior trim: Black bumpers and grille centre
- Decals/badges: Tapering side stripes with "Sprite" logo
- Interior: Grey Herringbone seat facings
- Equipment: Exacton 5x10 inch alloy wheels with 165/70x10 tyres, Mini Special wheel arch extensions, twin door mirrors, 1275 GT instrumentation and Clubman upper dash facia
- Production: 2,500

The Mini Sprite was released in anticipation of the 25th anniversary of the Mini. Its name revived the old Austin-Healey name last used in 1971. The Sprite was intended to be an intermediate trim level between the "City" and the "Mayfair".

=== Mini Studio 2 ===
- Year: 1990 (June)
- Based on: Mini City
- Engine: 998 cc
- Exterior colour:
  - Black (PDE - BLVC373)
  - Nordic Blue (JQV - BLVC863)
  - Storm Grey (LOZ - BLVC867)
- Exterior trim: Chrome grille, black bumpers
- Decals/badges: Studio 2 Decals, green stripe and three green dots below the window line
- Interior: Doeskin seat covers with green diagonal stripe, three-spoked steering wheel with unique green Mini badge.
- Equipment: full-width wheeltrims, opening rear quarterlights and an R750 stereo, 12' steel wheels with hubcaps, front disc brakes.
- Production: 1,500 for UK (RHD), 500 for Germany (LHD)

The Studio 2 name was first used on the Metro in 1987/88.

=== Mini Neon ===
- Year: 1991 (February)
- Based on: Mini City
- Engine: 998 cc
- Exterior colour:
  - Nordic Blue (JQV - BLVC863)
  - Pearlescent Caribbean Blue (UME - BLVC911)
- Exterior trim: Chrome bumpers, door handles, grille surround and exhaust tailpipe
- Decals/badges: Coachlines with "Neon by Mini" decals.
- Interior: Chevron velour with Neon badge on steering wheel.
- Equipment: Full-width wheel trims, standard passenger side door mirror, R280 digital radio/cassette, hinged rear windows
- Production: 1,500

The "Neon" was originally meant to be produced in Caribbean Blue Pearlescent, but problems with the new paint meant that the production version was made in Nordic Blue, at least one was produced in Caribbean Blue and sold by Startins of Redditch. The "Neon" decals on the car still had a Caribbean Blue border, which was meant to blend with the paintwork, so looked a little odd on the Nordic cars.

=== Mini Cabriolet ===
- Year: 1991 (June)
- Based on: Mini Cooper
- Engine: 1275 cc
- Exterior colour:
  - Pearlescent Cherry Red
- Exterior trim: "LAMM" body kit
- Decals/badges: Cabriolet badge on boot. Coachlines with "LAMM" decals
- Interior: Wood-grain dash, three-instrument binnacle, wooden door cappings and gear knob, Mayfair seats and trim, leather steering wheel
- Equipment: Clarion CRH50 stereo, Revolite alloy wheels
- Production: 100

Rover first ordered 75 cars from Lamm Autohaus, and this was shortly followed by an order for an additional 25. After the success of this limited edition, Rover went into full-time production on the Mini Cabriolet.

=== Mini British Open Classic ===
- Year: 1992 (June)
- Based on: Mini Mayfair
- Engine: 1,275 cc
- Exterior colour:
  - British Racing Green (HNA)
- Exterior trim: Chrome bumpers, grille, and handles; body-color door mirrors; black wheelarch extensions and sill finishers
- Decals/badges: Coachlines with "British Open Classic" decals and coat of arms
- Interior: Stone Beige Countryman Tweed upholstery with leather inserts and green piping, cream leather steering wheel, matching doorcards and seatbelts, label stitched to seats reading "By Appointment to Her Majesty the Queen"
- Equipment: Electrically operated full-length Webasto sunroof, Minilite-style alloy wheels, R552 stereo, opening rear windows
- Tyres: 145/70R12 Pirelli Cinturato CN54
- Production: 1,000 for UK

A similar folding sunroof that appeared on the British Open Classic had been an option in 1991 only in Japan, but the model was known as the 'Canvas Top.' Only 400 were made. Some unsold models were registered as 1992s, but this model was only officially sold in Japan in 1991. One difference between the British Open Classic and the Japanese Canvas Top model was that the Japanese canvas top could be opened from the rear as well as the front. Opening from the rear was done manually by first releasing two latches on the inside rear of the top akin to those commonly found on convertible tops, and physically pushing the top forward. Opening from the front was accomplished via an electric motor just like in the British Open Classic.

The British Open Classic was also made for other markets in larger numbers, these can be identified by either being left hand drive, fuel injected or no tweed inserts in the seats. UK spec Open Classics were all carburetor engines but the shell is single point injection as it has the bracket on the bulk head to the right of the carburetor. Unlike most limited editions the Open Classic has opening rear windows and a two pod dash, i.e. no rev counter. The export version has a three pod dash (this seems to vary, a German version and an Italian version are known, which have two pod dashes, so further research please). Also, there are export versions in existence, which are black, again, known are German and Italian cars. The Italian version also has beige cloth upholstery, without leather trimmings, also prepared for a radio (speakers, cables and antenna, but delivered without actual stereo unit).

=== Mini Italian Job ===
- Year: 1992 (October)
- Based on: Mini Mayfair
- Engine: 1,275 cc
- Exterior colour:
  - Flame Red (COF - BLVC818)
  - Metallic British Racing Green (HAM - BLVC1216)
  - Diamond White (NMN - BLVC655)
  - Electric Blue (NMN - BLVC997)
- Exterior trim: Body-coloured wing mirrors, white grilles, black bumpers.
- Decals/badges: Bonnet stripes, "Italian Job" badge, crossed Italian and British flag decals
- Interior: Black tweed, three-spoke steering wheel with Italian flag on steering wheel and front seats
- Equipment: Tinted glass, twin driving lamps, opening rear quarter windows
- Tyres: 145/70R12 Pirelli Cinturato CN54
- Production: 1,000 for UK, 750 for Italy

Inspired by the 1969 film "The Italian Job", these cars were made to look like Coopers though they produced only 50 hp.

=== Mini Rio ===
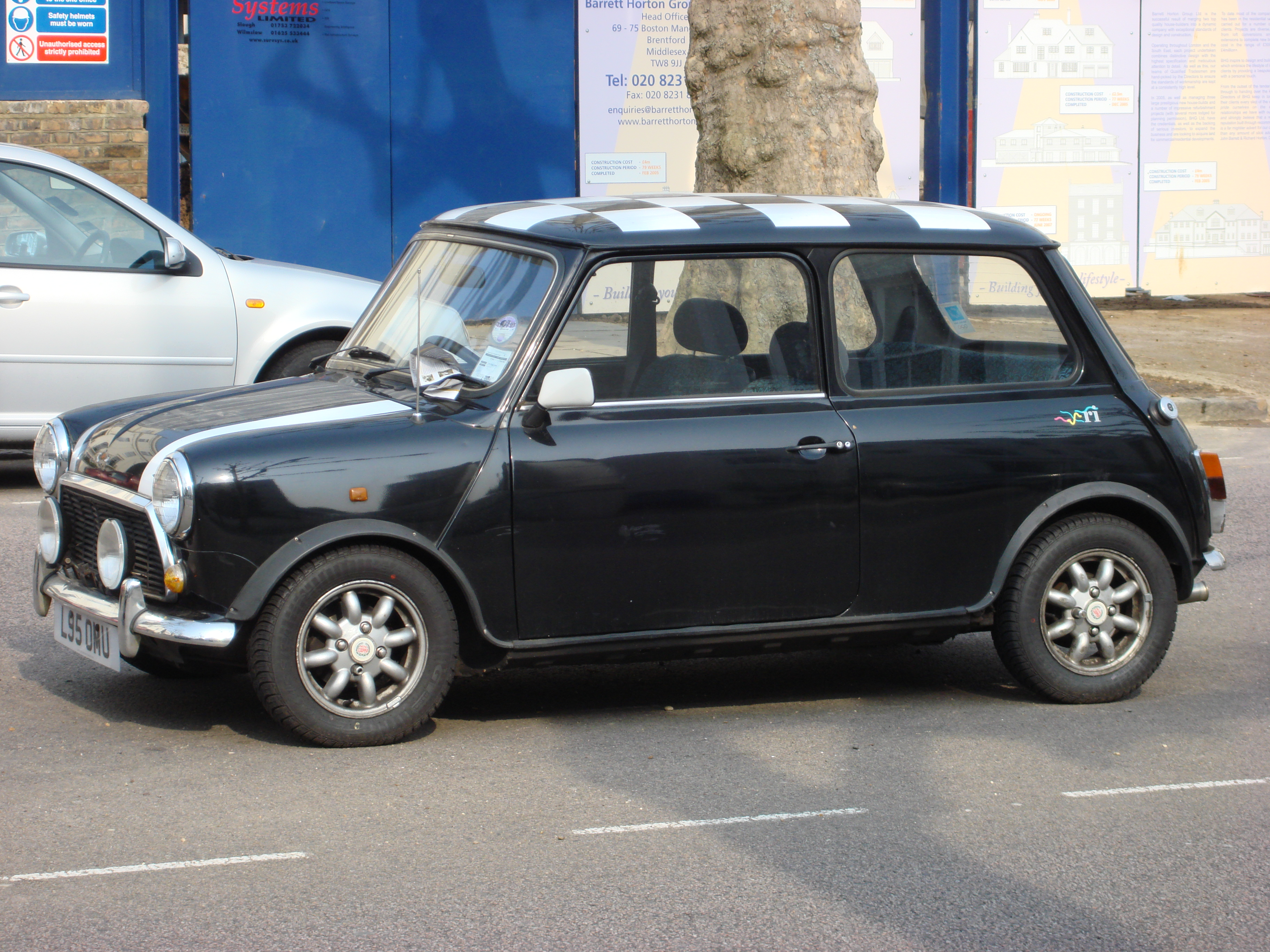
Mini Rio

- Year: 1993 (June)
- Based on: Mini Sprite
- Engine: 1,275 cc
- Exterior colour:
  - Black (PDE - BLVC373)
  - Pearlescent Caribbean Blue (UME - BLVC911)
  - Metallic Polynesian Turquoise (UMG - BLVC966)
- Exterior trim: Chrome bumpers
- Decals/badges: "Rio" Decals on flanks and boot
- Interior: Black with bright green Spira panels on doors and seats.
- Equipment: R562 radio/cassette
- Tyres: 145/70R12 Pirelli Cinturato CN54
- Production: 750

The colours offered on the Rio were usually extra-cost options on the standard Mini Sprite. The Rio name was also used on the Rover Metro in 1994. This was before Kia used the Rio name on its supermini model.

=== Mini Tahiti ===
- Year: 1993 (October)
- Based on: Mini Sprite
- Engine: 1,275 cc
- Exterior colour:
  - Tahiti Blue (JMP - BLVC65)
- Exterior trim: Chrome bumpers
- Decals/badges: "Tahiti" Decals with silhouetted palm trees on flanks and boot
- Interior: Black trim with blue-and-black door and seat inserts, colour-coded seat belts
- Equipment: Minilite-style alloy wheels, R652 radio/cassette
- Tyres: 145/70R12 Pirelli Cinturato CN54
- Production: 500

=== Mini Sidewalk / Mini Tartan ===
- Also known as: Mini Tartan (Japan)
- Year: 1995 (June)
- Based on: Mini Sprite
- Engine: 1,275 cc
- Exterior colour:
  - Charcoal Metallic
  - Kingfisher Blue
  - Diamond White
  - British Racing green (pearl)
- Exterior trim: Chrome bumpers
- Decals/badges: "Sidewalk" decals
- Interior: Red seat belts and blue tartan trim
- Equipment: Radio/cassette
- Production: 1,000 for UK

=== Mini Equinox ===
- Year: 1996 (April)
- Based on: Mini Sprite
- Engine: 1,275 cc SPi
- Exterior colour:
  - Amaranth Purple (KMN - BLVC1223)
  - Charcoal Grey (LVD - BLVC574)
  - Platinum Silver (MNX - BLVC1209)
- Exterior trim: Chrome bumpers and grille
- Decals/badges: Coachlines with "Equinox" Decals (astrological theme)
- Interior: Purple and black moon-and-stars printed fabric seat inserts with vinyl edging
- Equipment: Tinted glass, opening rear quarter windows, R660 radio/cassette, alarm/immobilizer
- Production: 750

=== Mini ERA Turbo ===
- Year: 1990
- Engine: 1,275 cc Turbocharged
- Exterior colour:
  - Flame Red (COF - BLVC818)
  - British Racing Green (HAF - BLVC617)
- Other special order colours:
  - Black
  - White
  - Silver
- Exterior trim: Body kit, grille with ERA badge, five-spoke wheels with ERA emblem, rear windscreen wiper
- Decals/badges: Turbo bonnet badge, ERA badge fitted to rear, ERA ID plate on slam panel
- Interior: Available in full- or half-leather modified Austin Metro seats
- Equipment: Two speakers fitted to parcel shelf, radio (same manufacturer)
- Production: 99 UK & 337 Japan

96 bhp@8 psi turbo boost

== Registers ==
- Mini Special Register
- Mini 25 Register
- Mini Paul Smith Register
- Mini RSP Register
- Mini Cooper Sport 500 Register
- Mini Equinox Register
- Mini Designer Register
- Mini Sky & Rose Register
- Mini Cooper 35 Register
