= Rowntree's Fruit Gums =

Brand of candy

Fruit Gums

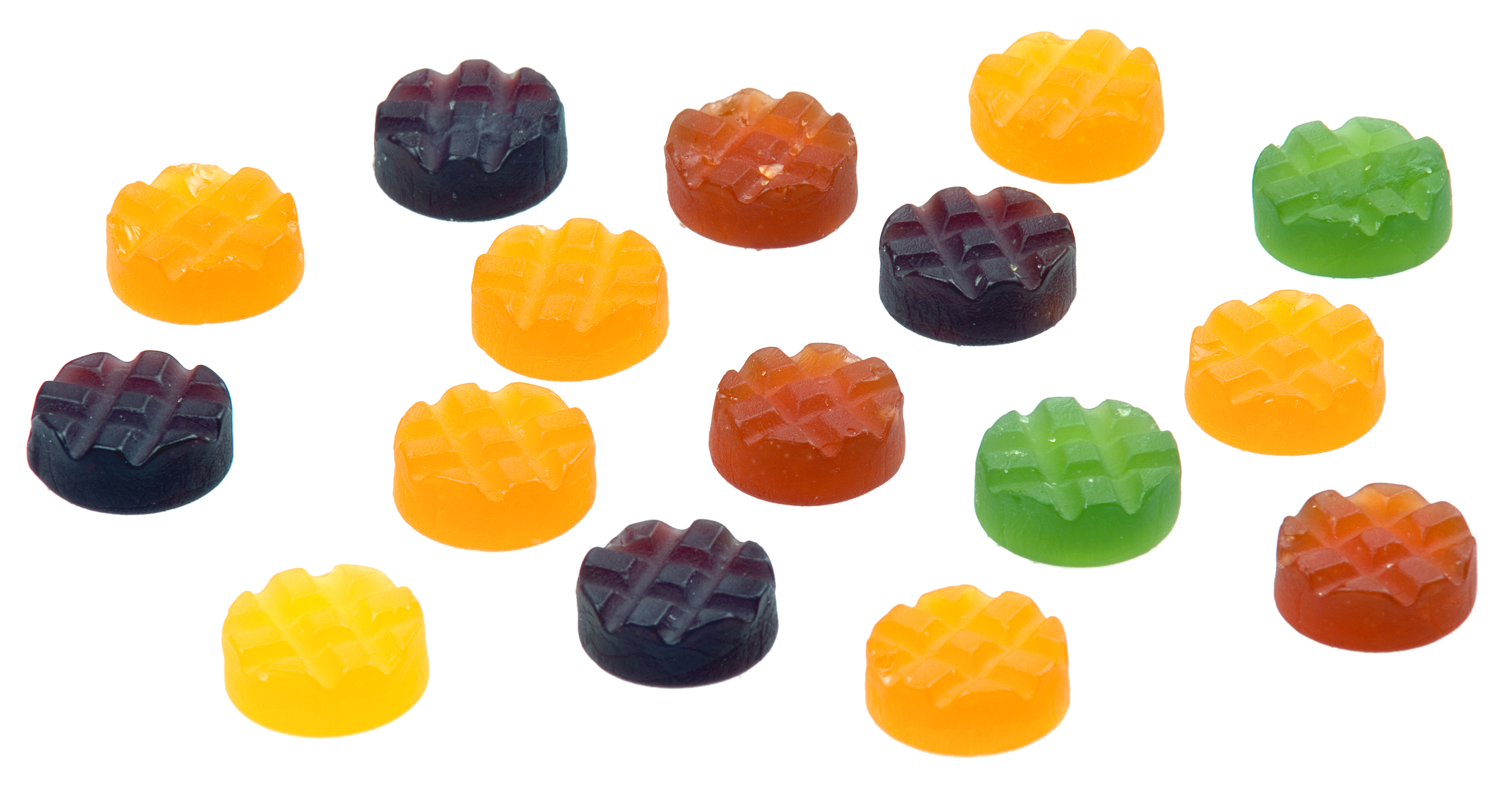
- Product type: Gumdrop
- Current owner: Nestlé
- Country: United Kingdom
- Introduced: 1893; 133 years ago
- Previous owners: Rowntree's
- Website: rowntrees.co.uk/fruitgums

Rowntree's Fruit Gums are circular sweets formerly made by Rowntree's, who were later acquired by Nestlé. There are five flavours, each of a different colour: strawberry (originally raspberry), orange, lemon, blackcurrant, and lime.

The sweets were introduced in 1893, and originally marketed as Rowntree's Clear Gums - "The nation's favourite sweet" - and were available in twopenny tubes and sixpenny packets. In addition to the traditional roll packaging, they were available in a larger-volume box containing the sweets in the shape of the fruit or part of the fruit that the flavour represents.

In 2020 Nestlé changed the Fruit Gum recipe to a vegan-friendly recipe

== Ingredients ==
Glucose Syrup, Sugar, Starch, Gum Arabic, Acids (Malic Acid, Citric Acid, Lactic Acid, Acetic Acid), Concentrated Fruit Juice (1%) (Apple, Blackcurrant, Orange, Lime, Strawberry, Lemon), Acidity Regulator (Trisodium Citrate), Flavourings, Colours (Anthocyanins, Copper Complexes of Chlorophyllins, Beta-Carotene, Curcumin), Glazing Agent (Carnauba Wax).

Below are the previous ingredients before they removed the gelatine and carminic acid from the recipe to make it suitable for vegans:

Glucose Syrup, Sugar, Starch, Gelatine, Acids (Malic Acid, Citric Acid, Lactic Acid), Concentrated Fruit Juice (1%) (Grape, Apple, Blackcurrant, Strawberry, Orange, Lemon, Lime), Acidity Regulator (Trisodium Citrate), Flavourings, Naturally Sourced Colours (Anthocyanins, Carminic Acid, Copper Complexes of Chlorophyllins, Curcumin, Carotenes), Glazing Agent (Carnauba Wax).

Rowntree's changed their fruit gums recipe to a vegan friendly recipe.

The fruit-juice content was 25 percent up until around 2010, when it was changed to 1 percent concentrated fruit juice.

In 2017 Nestlé announced that they would reduce the amount of sugar by 30%.

== "Don't Forget the Fruit Gums, Mum" ==
An advertising campaign for the gums that ran for three years from 1958 to 1961 included the slogan "Don't Forget the Fruit Gums, Mum". The slogan was invented by the copywriter Roger Musgrave (1929–2007).

The television advert featured a young boy reminding his mother to buy fruit gums as she leaves to go shopping. The advert claims that "[Fruit Gums] last all day" and that "Rowntree's Fruit Gums last the longest"; this probably referred to the length of time taken for the sweets to dissolve in the mouth.

== See also ==
- Joseph Rowntree (philanthropist)
- List of confectionery brands
