= Kenneth Dixon =

Kenneth Dixon may refer to:

- Kenneth Dixon (American football) (born 1994), American football running back
- Ken Dixon (born 1960), American baseball pitcher
- Ken Dixon (confectioner) (1929–2022), British confectioner
