= Rowntree's Fruit Pastilles =

British confectionery

Fruit Pastilles
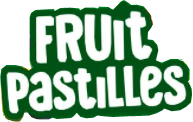

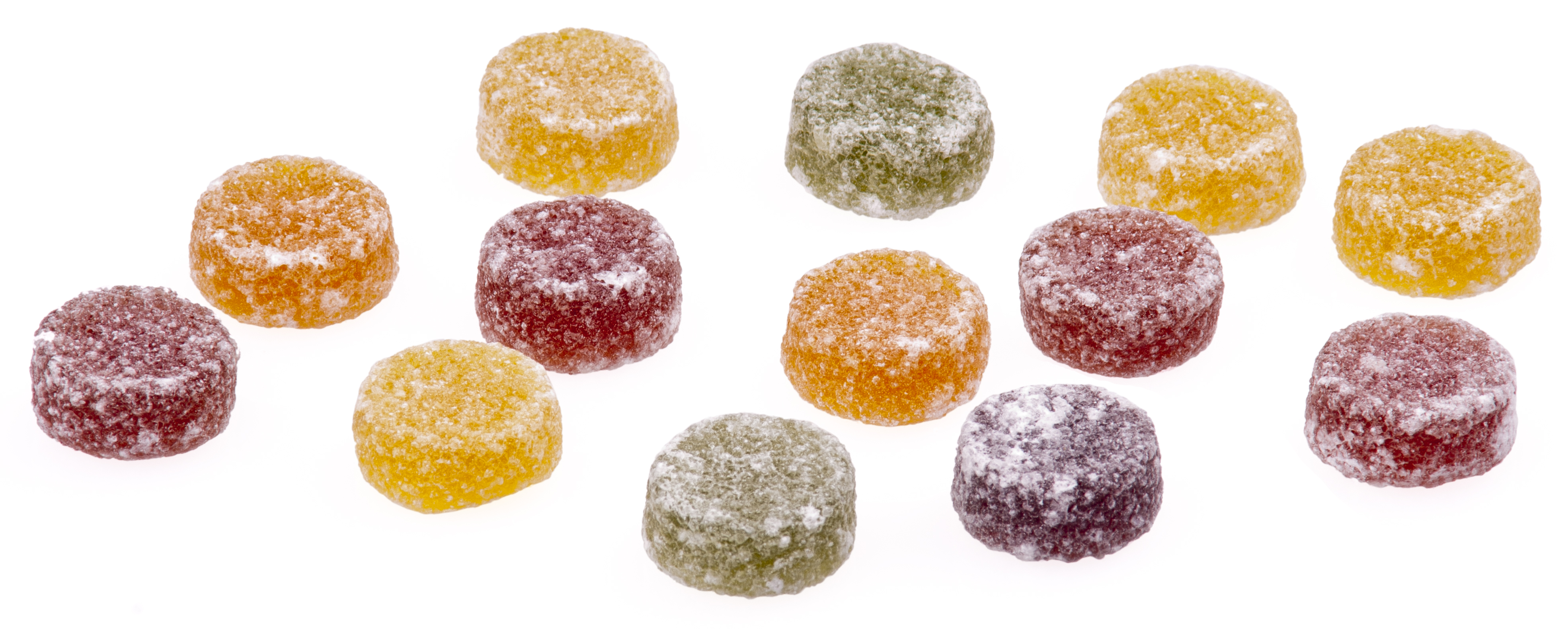
- Product type: Gumdrop
- Current owner: Nestlé
- Country: United Kingdom
- Introduced: 1881; 145 years ago
- Previous owners: Rowntree's
- Website: nestle-confectionery.co.uk/brands/rowntrees

Rowntree's Fruit Pastilles (/ˈpæstɪl/ PAST-il; French: [pas.tij]; previously rebranded in Australia as Wonka Fruit Pastilles after the 1988 acquisition of Rowntree's by Nestlé prior to their local discontinuation, and currently rebranded as Fruit Joy in Italy; Frutips in Canada, China, Hong Kong, Singapore and Taiwan) are small round sweets measuring about 1.5 cm (0.6 in) in diameter; they have a jelly-like consistency, and are covered with sugar. They contain fruit juice, have no artificial colours or flavours, and come in five flavours: lemon (yellow), lime (green), strawberry (red), blackcurrant (purple) and orange (orange).

Rowntree's Fruit Pastilles originated in York, England, in 1881. Production was moved to Fawdon in 1958 following the opening of the new Rowntree's factory in 1957. In 2023, production was moved offshore to the Czech Republic.

== History ==
At Rowntree's factory in York in 1881, Rowntree introduced Fruit Pastilles, and the product proved to be a great success, accounting for about 25 percent of the company's tonnage by 1887. In September 2020, Nestlé announced their intention to make Rowntree's Fruit Pastilles suitable for vegans after many years of requests from consumers.

Tubes of Fruit Pastilles are wrapped in foil-backed paper (paper on the inside, foil on the outside) with a paper wrapper over the top. The paper wrapper is green in colour with "Fruit Pastilles" written along the front in large lettering. Along the bottom of the lettering there are pictures of different types of fruit all relating to the flavours within the packet, The top bears the "Rowntree's" brand name. Fruit Pastilles come in a small pack weighing 52.5 grams (1.85 oz), containing 14 pastilles, but are also available in larger bags weighing 180 grams (6.3 oz). They are also available in boxes and larger round cardboard tubes.

== Marketing and advertising ==
The 1972 television advertising campaign used the song Pistol Packin' Mama with the tag line "Pastille Pickin' Mama, pass those pastilles round".

To drive awareness of the 25% fruit juice recipe in Fruit Pastilles, Rowntree conducted a 105-day experimental marketing campaign. At family events, top-end grocers and service stations they invited families to join in their 'What Can You Do But Chew?' talent shows, tying in with the brand's sponsorship of Britain's Got Talent. 427,240 product samples were distributed as brand ambassadors tried to engage parents with the '25% fruit juice' message. 93% of the consumers involved said they'd had a positive shift in brand perception, whilst more than half were 'highly likely' to purchase post campaign.

== See also ==
- Joseph Rowntree (philanthropist)
- List of confectionery brands
- Rowntree's
