= Ken Dixon (confectioner) =

English businessman (1929–2022)

- Born: Kenneth Herbert Morley Dixon; 19 August 1929; Heaton Moor, Stockport
- Died: 10 February 2022 (aged 92); York
- Education: University of Manchester
- Occupation: Businessman
- Spouse: Patricia Whalley (m. 1955)
- Children: 2

Kenneth Herbert Morley Dixon CBE (19 August 1929 – 10 February 2022) was a British businessman who worked for the Rowntree's confectionery company in York, starting from 1956. He was initially responsible for the Black Magic brand of chocolates and introduced the popular After Eight mint chocolate wafers. Dixon rose to become chairman of the company in 1981. After it was taken over by Nestlé in 1988, he served on the board of that and other companies including British Rail and Yorkshire-Tyne Tees Television. He also supported a variety of educational and philanthropic institutions in York including the University and the Joseph Rowntree Foundation.

Dixon died on 10 February 2022, at the age of 92.

== Early and personal life ==
Dixon was born in Heaton Moor, Stockport to parents Arnold Dixon, a shipping merchant, and Mary (née Jolly). Dixon spent his childhood in the French Quarter of Shanghai for his father's work, and then Australia with his mother and brother Graham, before returning to England with the whole family in 1946. Dixon went on to study economics at the University of Manchester.

In 1955, Dixon married Patricia Whalley, whom he had met at the Calico Printers Association, and moved to York the following year. They had two sons.
