= Henry Isaac Rowntree =

English confectioner (1838–1883)

- Born: 1838
- Died: 1883 (aged 44–45)
- Occupation: Entrepreneur
- Known for: Founder of Rowntree's

Henry Isaac Rowntree (1838–1883) was the founder of Rowntree's, one of the United Kingdom's largest confectionery businesses.

== Career ==
Having served his apprenticeship in his father's shop at The Pavement in York, and following his father's death in 1860, Henry Rowntree went to work for the Tuke family at their shop in Walmgate.

In June 1862 Henry Isaac bought out the chocolate, cocoa-making and chicory departments and ran the business himself employing around a dozen people. He followed Quaker principles and always insisted on the highest quality. In August 1864, he bought a disused foundry at Tanner's Moat and built a new factory there. However, he became distracted from his chocolate business by his mission to produce, edit and print the Yorkshire Weekly Press: accordingly his chocolate business suffered and in June 1869 he took on his brother Joseph as a full partner in the business, now renamed H. I. Rowntree & Co. The brothers continued in partnership and the business went from strength to strength until Henry Isaac's untimely death from peritonitis on 2 May 1883.

== Family ==
In February 1868 he married Harriet Selina Osborn in Scarborough.
