= Joseph Rowntree (philanthropist) =

English Quaker philanthropist (1836–1925)

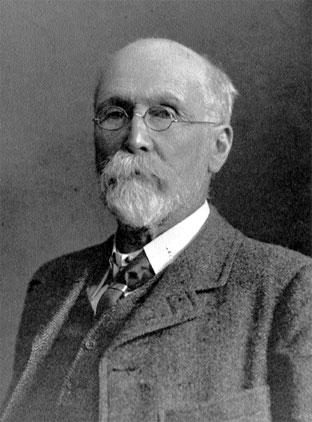
- Born: 24 May 1836; York, England
- Died: 24 February 1925 (aged 88); York, England
- Burial place: The Retreat, York, England
- Occupation: Chocolatier
- Spouses: Julia Seebohm (m. 1862; died 1863); Emma Seebohm (m. 1867)
- Children: 6, including Benjamin Seebohm Rowntree
- Father: Joseph Rowntree
- Relatives: Henry Isaac Rowntree (brother); John Stephenson Rowntree (brother)
- Website: Rowntree Society

Joseph Rowntree (24 May 1836 – 24 February 1925) was an English Quaker philanthropist and businessman from York. Rowntree is perhaps best known for being a champion of social reform, partner and friend of Charles Booth, and his time as a chocolatier at the family business Rowntree's, one of the most important in Britain. Even as a powerful businessman, he was deeply interested in improving the quality of life of his employees; this led to him becoming a philanthropist, pursuing many charitable causes.

In 1904 he created three trusts, the Joseph Rowntree Village Trust (JRVT) which was originally set up to build and manage the garden village of New Earswick, the Joseph Rowntree Charitable Trust (JRCT) and the Joseph Rowntree Social Services Trust (JRSST). He suggested that only the JRVT would be permanent, but all the trusts are still in existence. The Social Services Trust has changed its name to the Joseph Rowntree Reform Trust, and with the separation of the Joseph Rowntree Housing Trust from the Village Trust in 1968, there are now four trusts.

== Early life ==
Rowntree was born the son of Sarah and Joseph Rowntree, on Pavement (the name of a street) in York, where his father owned a grocer's shop. He attended Bootham School. At fourteen he accompanied his father on a visit to Ireland, and witnessed the effects of the Great Famine. This experience was to provide the grounding for his political views and business ideas later in life.

== Career ==
The following year he started working in his father's grocery business as an apprentice, alongside fellow Quakers Lewis Fry and George Cadbury. After his father's death in 1859 he took over the running, jointly managing the business with his brother John Stephenson Rowntree.

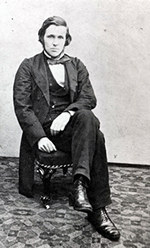
Rowntree c. 1862, aged 26

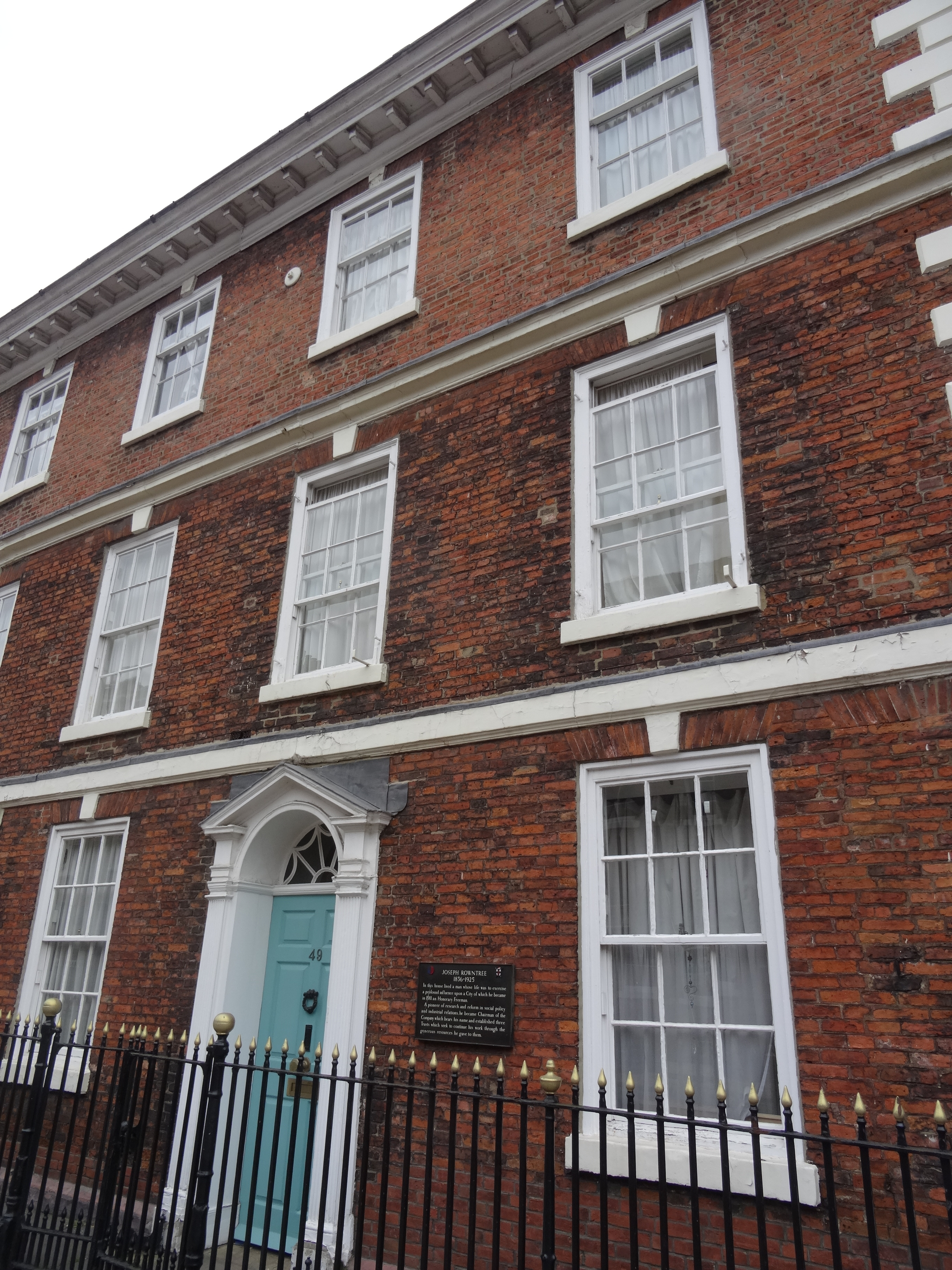
The house where Rowntree lived, on Bootham in York

In 1869 he joined his brother, Henry Isaac Rowntree, who owned a chocolate factory in York. When Henry Isaac died in 1883, Joseph became the owner of the company. Joseph pursued his progressive ideas within the running of Rowntree's, in the design of the new factory opened in 1881, and in the business practices followed therein, including the founding of one of the first Occupational Pension Schemes.

By the end of the nineteenth century, the company, Rowntree's, grew from 30 to over 4,000 employees, making it Britain's eightieth largest manufacturing employer. It merged with John Mackintosh and Co. in 1969 and was taken over by Nestlé in 1988.

He had two marriages, to Julia Eliza Seebohm in 1862 who died in 1863, and then to her cousin Emma Antoinette Seebohm in 1867, with whom he had six children. The social investigator Seebohm Rowntree was one of their children.

Joseph Rowntree's grave, along with these of many other members of his family, can be seen in the Quaker cemetery within the grounds of The Retreat on Heslington Road, York.

Philosophical and political views: Joseph Rowntree was a supporter of liberal values, and was anxious to improve the quality of life of his employees. He provided them with a library, free education, a works magazine, a social welfare officer, a doctor, a dentist and a pension fund.

== The Joseph Rowntree School ==
The Joseph Rowntree School was built in York in 1942 by the Joseph Rowntree Village Trust. In 2010 the school relocated to new premises costing £29 million. Students refer to it as "Joro".

== The Joseph Rowntree statue campaign ==
A campaign was started in summer 2012 to put a statue of Joseph Rowntree at a prominent site in the centre of York, with a Facebook page – "A Joseph Rowntree statue for York City Centre" – that stated: "York should be proud of its greatest son! This campaign aims to place a statue of Joseph Rowntree, philanthropist, social reformer, and chocolatier, in Parliament Square, York, on the site of the repulsed and now-demolished toilet block."
