= Black Magic (chocolates) =

British brand of chocolate

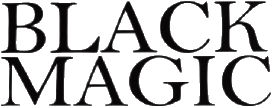
- Product type: Chocolate
- Current owner: Nestlé
- Country: UK
- Introduced: 1933; 93 years ago
- Previous owners: Rowntree's
- Website: nestle.co.uk/blackmagic

Black Magic is a British brand of boxed chocolates originally created by Rowntree's in 1933. The brand is now owned by Nestlé. Sold as an affordable version of an (at that time) otherwise very expensive luxury product, they were marketed as a courtship gift. In the 1970s, the brand was advertised using the slogan "Who knows the secret of the Black Magic box?"

Christopher Gunning wrote the music for the iconic series of advertisements that ran on British television from 1971 well into the 1980s.

== Current selection ==
- Almond Crunch
- Raspberry Heaven
- Dreamy Fudge
- Hazelnut Swirl
- Orange Sensation
- Caramel Heart
- Coffee Crescent
- Pure Black Magic
- Midnight Truffle

== See also ==
- Milk Tray
