= After Eight =

Mint chocolates made by Nestlé

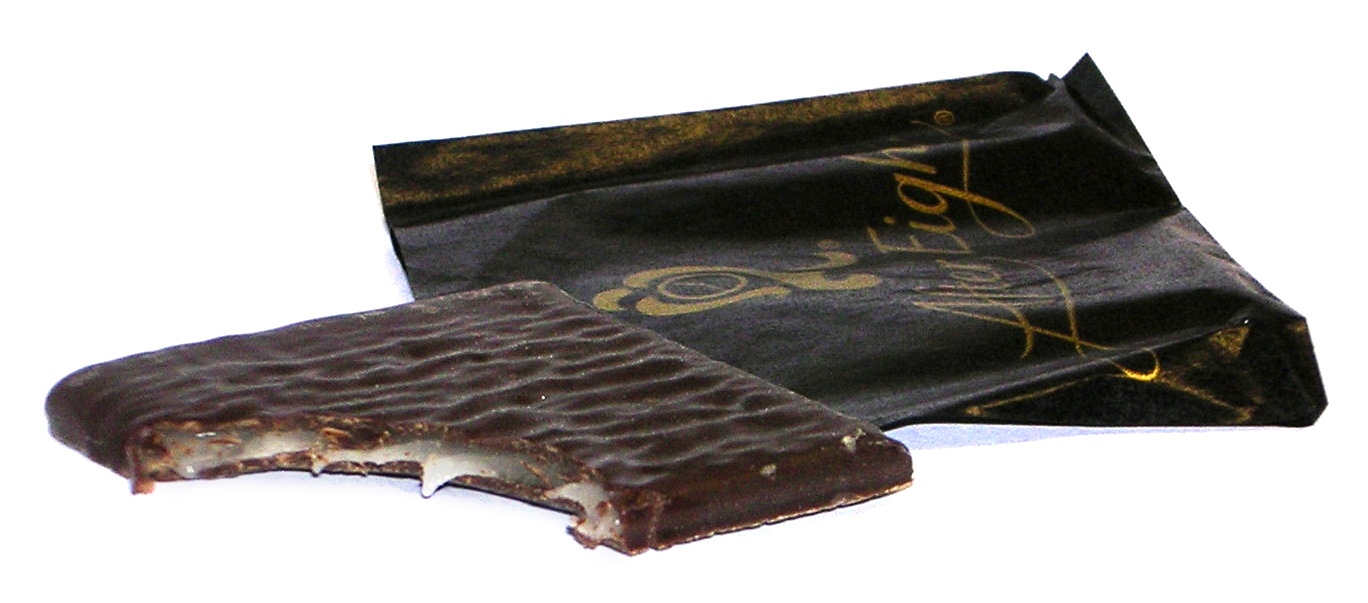
- Product type: Chocolate confection
- Current owner: Nestlé (1988–present)
- Country: UK
- Introduced: 1962; 64 years ago
- Previous owners: Rowntree's (1962–1988)
- Website: nestle.co.uk/aftereight

After Eight Mint Chocolate Thins, often referred to as simply After Eights, are a brand of confectionery consisting of a thin peppermint fondant coated in dark chocolate. They were created by Brian Sollitt at Rowntree Company Limited in the UK in 1962 and have been manufactured by Nestlé since its acquisition of Rowntree in 1988.

== Manufacturing ==
The mints were originally manufactured at Rowntree's York factory, before production transferred to Castleford, West Yorkshire, in 1970. For the UK market, they are now manufactured in Halifax following Nestlé's closure of the Castleford factory in 2012, with over one billion After Eights produced every year.

After Eights were originally made from dairy-free dark chocolate. In 2002, however, Nestlé started adding butterfat to After Eights made at certain production facilities so as to increase resistance to chocolate bloom. This practice expanded to all production facilities in 2009. Nestlé has also made special editions of After Eights, including Orange & Mint, Strawberry & Mint, Gin and Tonic & Mint, and milk chocolate. In 2026, After Eight variants were launched in orange, caramel and raspberry flavours.

The fondant in the centre of After Eights is made from a stiff paste of sucrose (common sugar), water, and a small amount of the enzyme invertase. During manufacture this paste is hard enough not to be deformed when liquid chocolate is poured over it to coat it. After manufacture, the enzyme gradually splits the sucrose into the much more soluble sugars glucose and fructose, resulting in a more liquid consistency. Each After Eight chocolate is packaged in an individual wrapper and then loaded into a box. After Eights are certified kosher dairy by the Orthodox Union.
