= Rowntree's =

English confectionery company

Nestlé UK Ltd.
- Trade name: Rowntree's
- Formerly: Rowntree Mackintosh P L C (1897–1987); Rowntree Limited (1987–1991)
- Type: Subsidiary
- Industry: Confectionery
- Founded: 1862; 164 years ago
- Founder: Henry Isaac Rowntree
- Headquarters: York, England
- Key people: Joseph Rowntree
- Products: Sweets
- Brands: Jelly Tots; Randoms; Fruit Gums; Fruit Pastilles
- Parent: Nestlé
- Website: rowntrees.co.uk

Nestlé UK Ltd. (UK: /ˈnɛsleɪ/ NESS-lay), trading as Rowntree's (/ˈraʊntriːz/ ROWN-treez), is a British confectionery brand and a former business based in York, England. Rowntree developed Fruit Pastilles (introduced in 1881), KitKat (introduced in 1935), Aero (introduced in 1935), Smarties (introduced in 1937), After Eight thin mint chocolates (introduced in 1962), and acquired the Rolo and Quality Street brands when it merged with Mackintosh's in 1969 to form Rowntree Mackintosh Confectionery. The Yorkie and Lion bars were introduced in 1976. Rowntree's also pioneered festive selection boxes (a gift consisting of assorted bars and sweets) which in the UK have been a staple gift at Christmas for over a century.

Founded in 1862, the company developed strong associations with Quaker philanthropy. Throughout much of the 19th and 20th centuries, it was one of the big three confectionery manufacturers in the United Kingdom, alongside Cadbury and Fry, both also founded by Quakers.

In 1981, Rowntree's received the Queen's Award for Enterprise for outstanding contribution to international trade. In 1988, when the company was acquired by Nestlé, it was the fourth-largest confectionery manufacturer in the world. The Rowntree brand continues to be used to market Nestlé's jelly sweet brands, such as Fruit Gums and Fruit Pastilles. Rowntree's ceased to exist as a corporate entity in 1991, becoming Nestlé UK.

== Victorian era ==
Rowntree's was founded in 1862 at Castlegate, in York, by Henry Isaac Rowntree, a Quaker, as the company manager bought out the Tuke family.

In 1864, Rowntree acquired an old iron foundry at Tanner's Moat for £1,000, and moved production there. In 1869, the factory was staffed by 12 men. By 1869, Rowntree was in financial difficulties and his brother, Joseph Rowntree, joined him in full partnership, and H.I. Rowntree & Co was formally established.

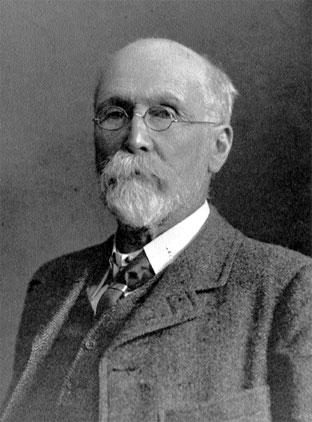
Joseph Rowntree became owner of the company when his brother and founder, Henry, died in 1883.

In 1881, Rowntree introduced Fruit Pastilles, competing against French imports of the time, and the product proved to be a great success, accounting for about 25% of the company's tonnage by 1887. This success allowed the company to invest in a Van Houten press, which enabled it to produce chocolate with the cocoa butter removed, to compete with Cadbury's successful Cocoa Essence. In the 1890s, Rowntree transformed from a small family business into a large-scale manufacturer, as sales more than quadrupled due to an increased demand among the public for confectionery.

In 1889, Seebohm Rowntree established a small research and testing laboratory for analysing ingredients and rival company products. In 1890, to cater for this increased demand, Rowntree acquired a 20-acre site at Haxby Road on the outskirts of York. The Tanner's Moat site had become too small for Rowntree's needs, and the company had noted the success of Cadbury's purpose-built factory in Bournville. In 1893, the company introduced Rowntree's Fruit Gums.

By 1897, the unlimited partnership needed external funding for its expansion, and became a public limited liability company called Rowntree & Co. Robert Fitzgerald has accused the company of being slow in new product development and marketing compared to its major competitor of the period, Cadbury. Fitzgerald suggests that Joseph Rowntree imitated the successes of competitors (Cadbury's Cocoa Essence, French fruit pastilles) and that under his leadership, the company did not introduce any innovations of its own. Around 1898, the company acquired its own cocoa plantations in the West Indies. In 1899, Rowntree introduced its first milk chocolate block.

== 1900 to 1945 ==
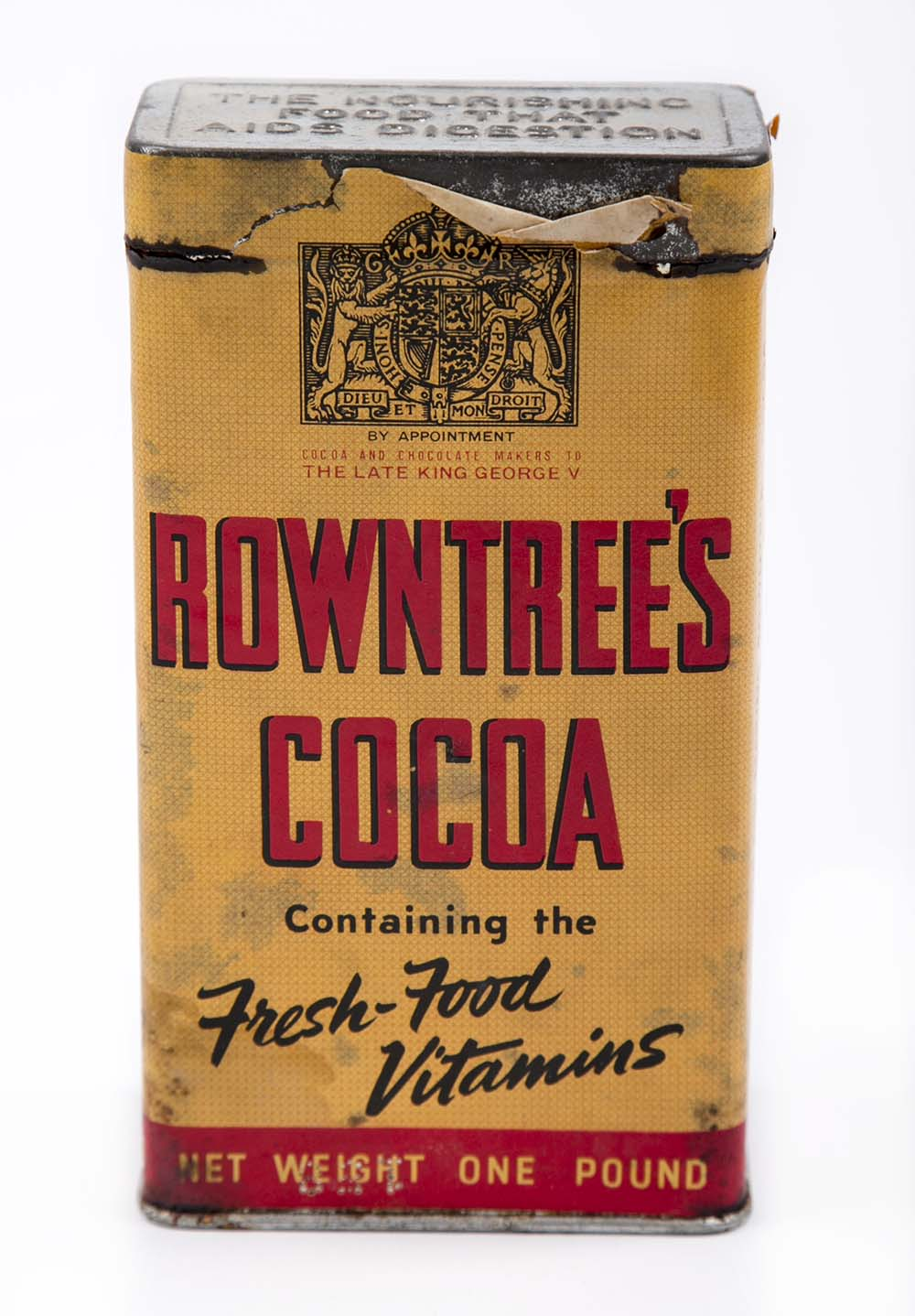
Rowntree's Cocoa tin manufactured between 1936 and 1941

Rowntree had struggled to make a milk chocolate product of comparable quality or value to Cadbury's Dairy Milk. Joseph Rowntree even described the growing market for milk chocolate as a fad. Rowntree's poor performance in the category became a major problem from 1914 onwards, as British public preference continued to move towards milk chocolate, and away from the more bitter cocoa essence products. Rowntree's two major rivals, Cadbury and Fry, merged in 1918, and although Rowntree was invited to participate in the merger, the company declined to do so. Meanwhile, the Rowntree board was torn as to whether it should become a low-turnover, high-quality product company or a mass producer of cheaper lines. Seebohm Rowntree inherited a struggling company when he succeeded his father as chairman in 1923. By 1930, as a result of all its problems, Rowntree was approaching bankruptcy.

In 1926, Rowntree's acquired the Cowan Company of Toronto Limited (founded in 1890 as Cowan Cocoa and Chocolate), for CA$1 million, giving Rowntree's a line of successful cocoa and chocolate products and a factory for the production of Rowntree's products for the Canadian market. From 1931, Rowntree of Canada began to manufacture Mackintosh toffees under licence. In 1927, the company began to market its fruit gums, and its pastilles from 1928, in the now familiar tube packaging. The company later produced the Coffee Crisp bar at the Canadian factory.

George Harris was appointed marketing manager for chocolate bars in January 1931. Harris had learned the latest marketing techniques while he was in the United States. According to Robert Fitzgerald, "It was Harris's drive and insight which inspired his firm's renaissance in the 1930s." In 1932, Rowntree appointed a new advertising agency, the London branch of J. Walter Thompson. Thompson undertook extensive market research to discover what consumers wanted. As a result of this research, the Black Magic assorted chocolate box was launched in 1934.

In January 1935, Rowntree decided to abandon its attempt to compete with Cadbury Dairy Milk. In May 1935, Rowntree launched the Aero, an aerated milk chocolate. The Chocolate Crisp, a wafer-and-chocolate bar later known as the KitKat, was also launched in 1935. In 1937, the Dairy Box of assorted chocolates was launched, using the market research that had been undertaken for Black Magic. Chocolate beans were first sold loose in 1938, but were later packaged in a cardboard tube and branded as Smarties. Polo, the distinctive mint with a hole in the centre, was developed in 1939, but its introduction was delayed by the onset of war. Harris was made company chairman in 1941.

== 1945 to 1988 ==
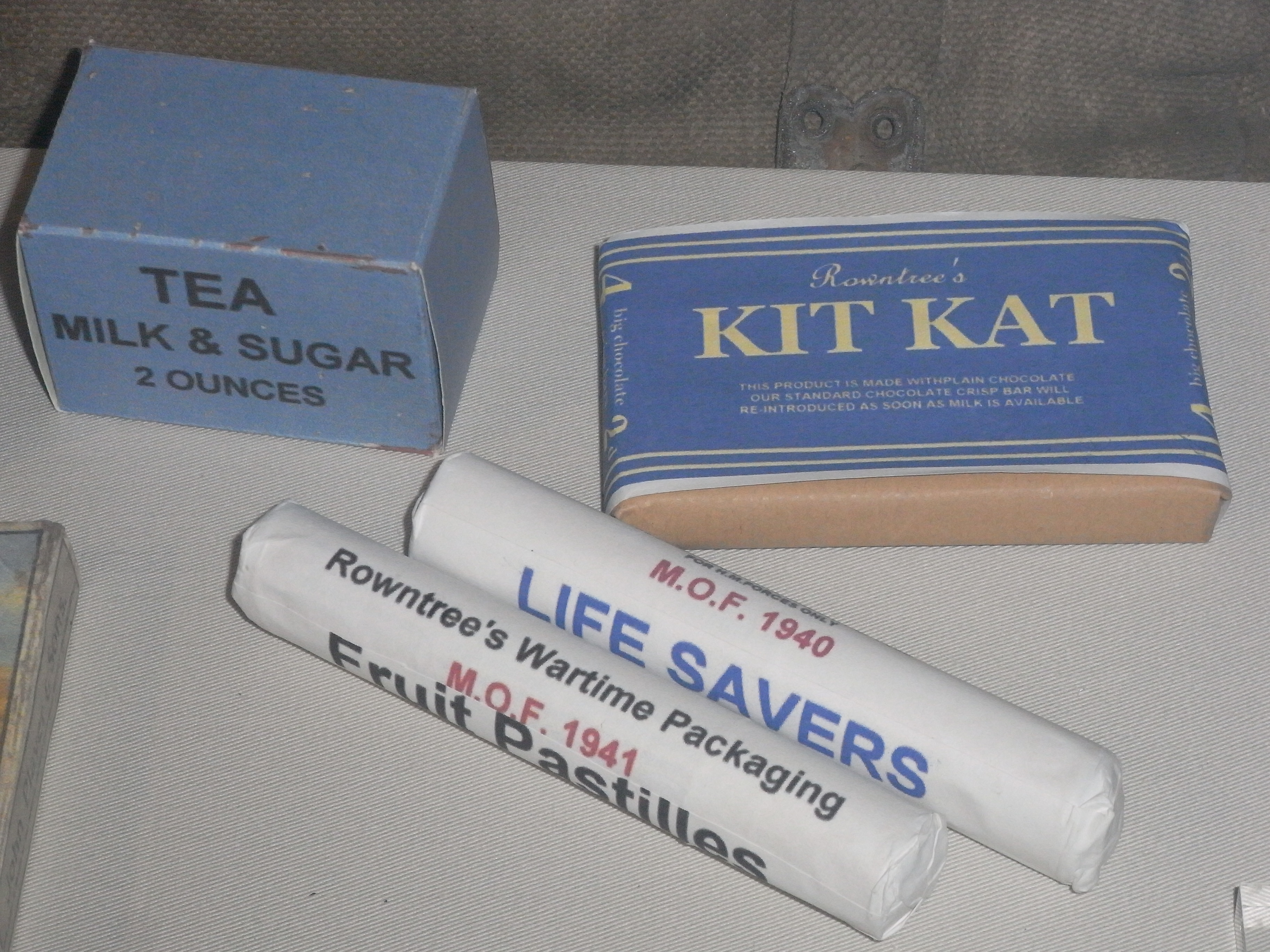
Exhibit of British foods during World War II, including Rowntree's KitKat and Fruit Pastilles. The KitKat adopted its familiar red packaging after the war.

Rowntree entered the continental Europe market in the 1960s, establishing production facilities in Hamburg, Dijon, Elst, and Noisiel. After Eight thin mint chocolates were launched in 1962.

In 1969, the Rowntree board rejected a £37 million takeover bid from General Foods. That same year, Rowntree entered into a long-term agreement with Hershey whereby Hershey would produce Rowntree products under license in the US. Rowntree merged with John Mackintosh and Co in 1969, to become Rowntree Mackintosh. Mackintosh produced Rolo, Munchies, Caramac, and Quality Street. Hershey's began U.S. distribution of KitKat in 1970 and followed in 1971 with Rolo.

In 1971, Rowntree Mackintosh acquired Menier Chocolate of France. In the same year, the board attempted to diversify the business, and made a bid for Bovril, but lost out to James Goldsmith's Cavenham Foods. In 1972, Hoadley's Chocolates of Australia was acquired by Rowntree Mackintosh. This company had invented such products as the Violet Crumble and Polly Waffle.

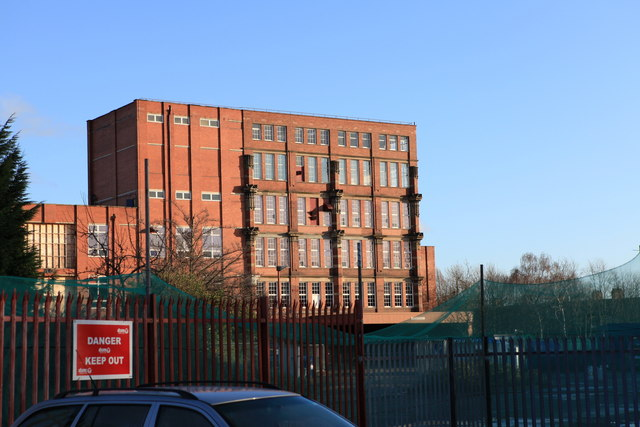
A view of the Nestlé production facility in York, England, in 2009

The Yorkie and Lion chocolate bars were introduced in 1976. In 1978, the Hershey contract was renegotiated, giving Hershey the rights to the KitKat and Rolo brands in the US in perpetuity.

Ken Dixon was appointed as chairman and chief executive in 1981. Between 1981 and 1987, Rowntree invested nearly £400 million in upgrading its manufacturing facilities and developing high-volume, product-dedicated equipment for several of the company's brands, including KitKat, After Eights, and Smarties.

Between 1983 and 1987, Rowntree spent nearly £400 million on acquisitions, including Tom's Foods for £138 million (1983), Laura Secord Chocolates for £19 million (1983), Hot Sam Pretzels for £14 million (1986), the Sunmark confectionery business in the US for £156 million (1986), and Gale's honey for £11 million (1986).

Between 1982 and 1987, the number of UK staff was reduced from 19,700 to 15,600. In 1987, Rowntree operated 25 factories in nine countries and employed 33,000 people, including close to 16,000 in its eight UK operations. Group turnover was £1.4 billion, with the UK and Ireland accounting for 40% of the total.

== Takeover by Nestlé ==
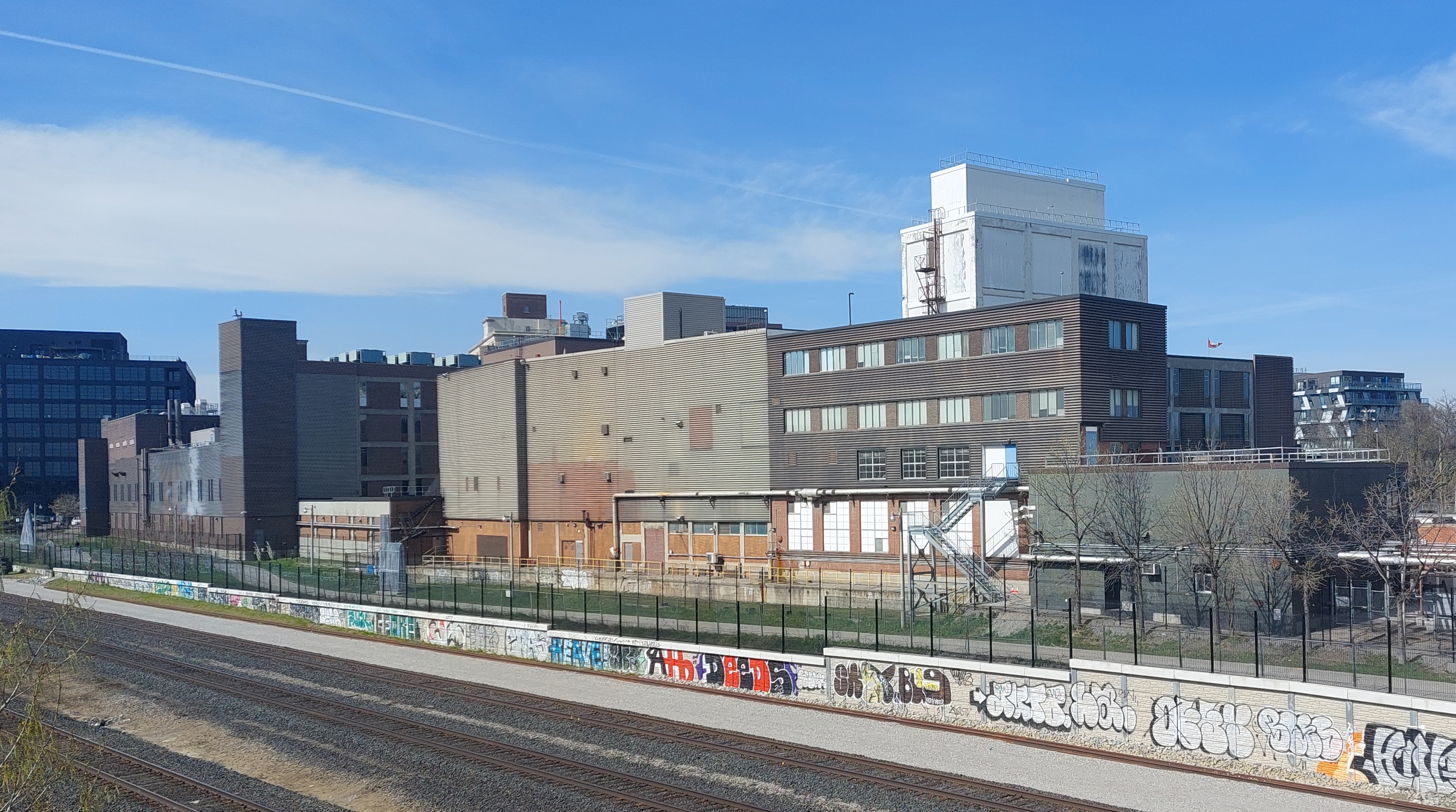
Nestlé Toronto, Canada chocolate production factory. Former Rowntree's facility.

On 13 April 1988, the Swiss confectioner Jacobs Suchard began a dawn raid on Rowntree's shares, which had been under-performing the market, although they were beginning to improve, taking a 14.9% stake in the company by 9:15 am. As a result, the managing director of Nestlé, Helmut Maucher, contacted Kenneth Dixon, the chairman of Rowntree, offering to act as a white knight. Nestlé was the largest food company in the world, and had been interested in Rowntree previously, but the Rowntree board would aggressively contest any attempted takeover, and Nestlé had never undertaken a hostile takeover before. Nestlé was worried about the potential of Rowntree falling into the hands of one of its major competitors. Rowntree was the fourth-largest chocolate manufacturer in the world, after Mars, Hershey, and Cadbury, with a 7% global market share.

Nestlé eventually won control with an offer valuing Rowntree at £2.55 billion. Strategically, Nestlé had always seen Rowntree as a perfect fit for its own operations. Nestlé had strength in the block chocolate bar business, and Rowntree had strength in the countline-branded chocolate business. Rowntree's strong global brands were the key reason for Nestlé's interest. Due to potential synergies between the two companies, Nestlé believed that savings between 5 and 15% of Rowntree's operating costs could be made if the companies were to combine.

The takeover was controversial, as Nestlé was effectively protected from similar takeover attempts under Swiss law. After the Nestlé takeover, the Rowntree chocolate ranges began to use the branding "Nestlé Rowntree", before eventually the Rowntree name was dropped from the packaging altogether, except on Rowntree's Cocoa and the Fruit Pastilles and Fruit Gums lines. The Mackintosh branding was dropped from all former Rowntree Mackintosh products except for Mackintosh's Toffee.

Nestlé still had to honour Rowntree's perpetual licensing agreement for Hershey to produce KitKat, Rolo, and other products in the United States. The agreement includes a "change of control" clause, allowing Nestlé to regain the US rights if Hershey is sold.

Between 1988 and 1994, the Nestlé Rowntree workforce was reduced by 2,000. The Nestlé Rowntree factory in Norwich closed in 1994, and Rolo, Yorkie, and Easter-egg production was moved to York.

In September 2006, it was announced that the manufacture of Smarties would be relocated to Hamburg, resulting in 645 job losses at the York factory. Production of Dairy Box was relocated to Spain, and Black Magic to the Czech Republic.

In May 2009, Nestlé launched a new jelly sweet, Rowntree's Randoms, and in April 2012, another new jelly sweet, Fruit Bottles, both under the Rowntree's brand.

Nestlé has invested more than £200 million in the Rowntree business since 1988, making the York site one of the world's largest confectionery factories. Nestlé's global research centre for confectionery is also based in York, and doubled in size following a £7 million investment.

== Current branded products ==
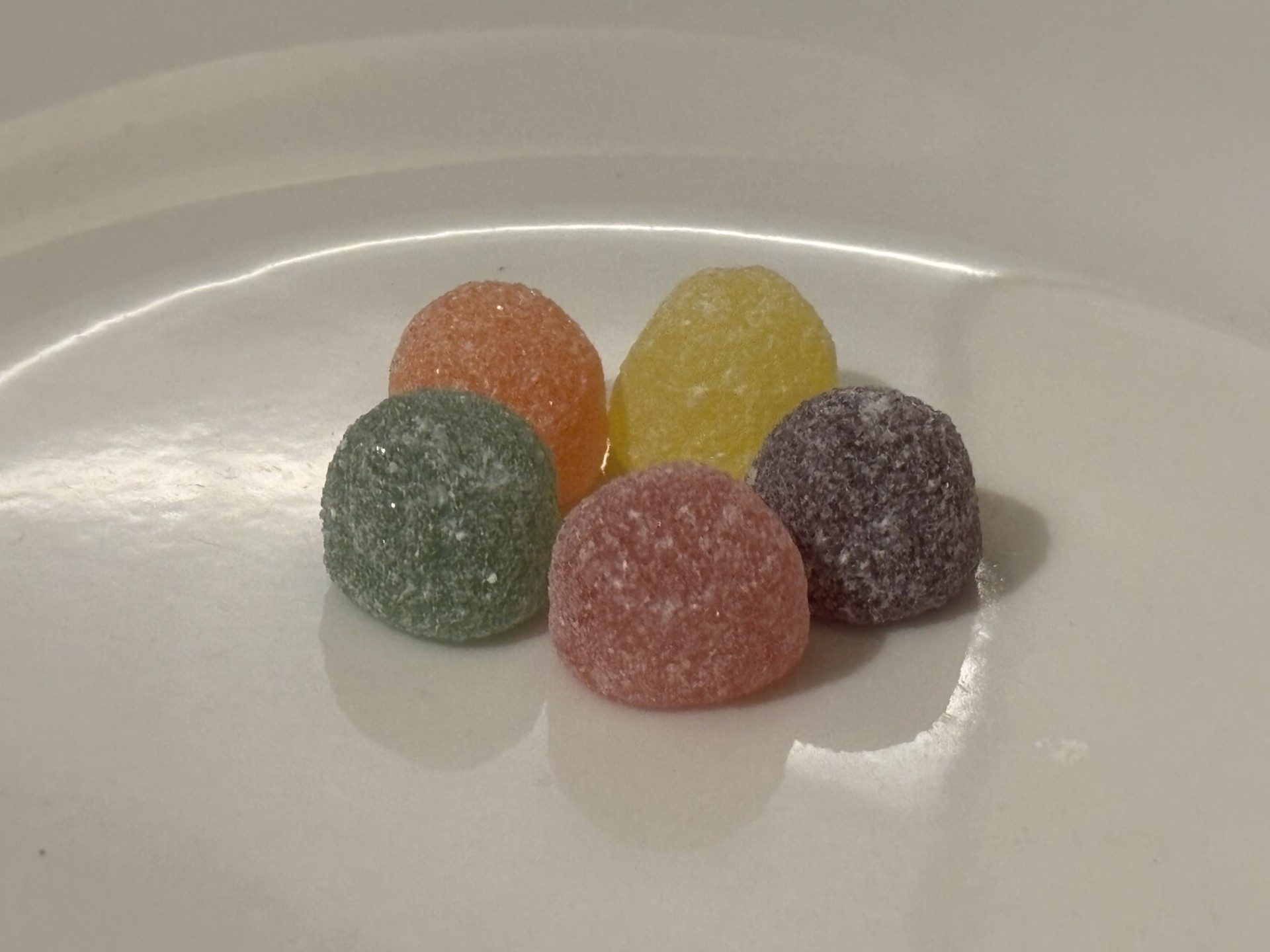
Jelly Tots

The best known products that are still branded under the Rowntree name are Rowntree's Fruit Gums, Rowntree's Fruit Pastilles and Jelly Tots. Jelly Tots are soft, chewy fruit-flavoured sweets. They are round, sugar-coated gumdrop-like confections and contain 25% fruit juices and no artificial colours or flavours. Jelly Tots were invented by Dr Brian Boffey of Horsforth, Leeds when he was working for Rowntree's. Jelly Tots were launched in 1965 and quickly became established as a popular children's brand in Europe. Rowntree's Randoms were introduced in 2009.

The Rowntree brand is also used on a number of ice lollies (made by Froneri) for Nestlé.

== Advertising ==
The company largely eschewed advertising before its establishment as a public company in 1897, when it employed S. H. Benson as its agency. Before 1930, the company considered that quality products would speak for themselves, and did not need advertising to sell their benefits.

In 1932, Rowntree changed their agency to the London branch of J. Walter Thompson.
