= Milk arrowroot biscuits =

Australian biscuit

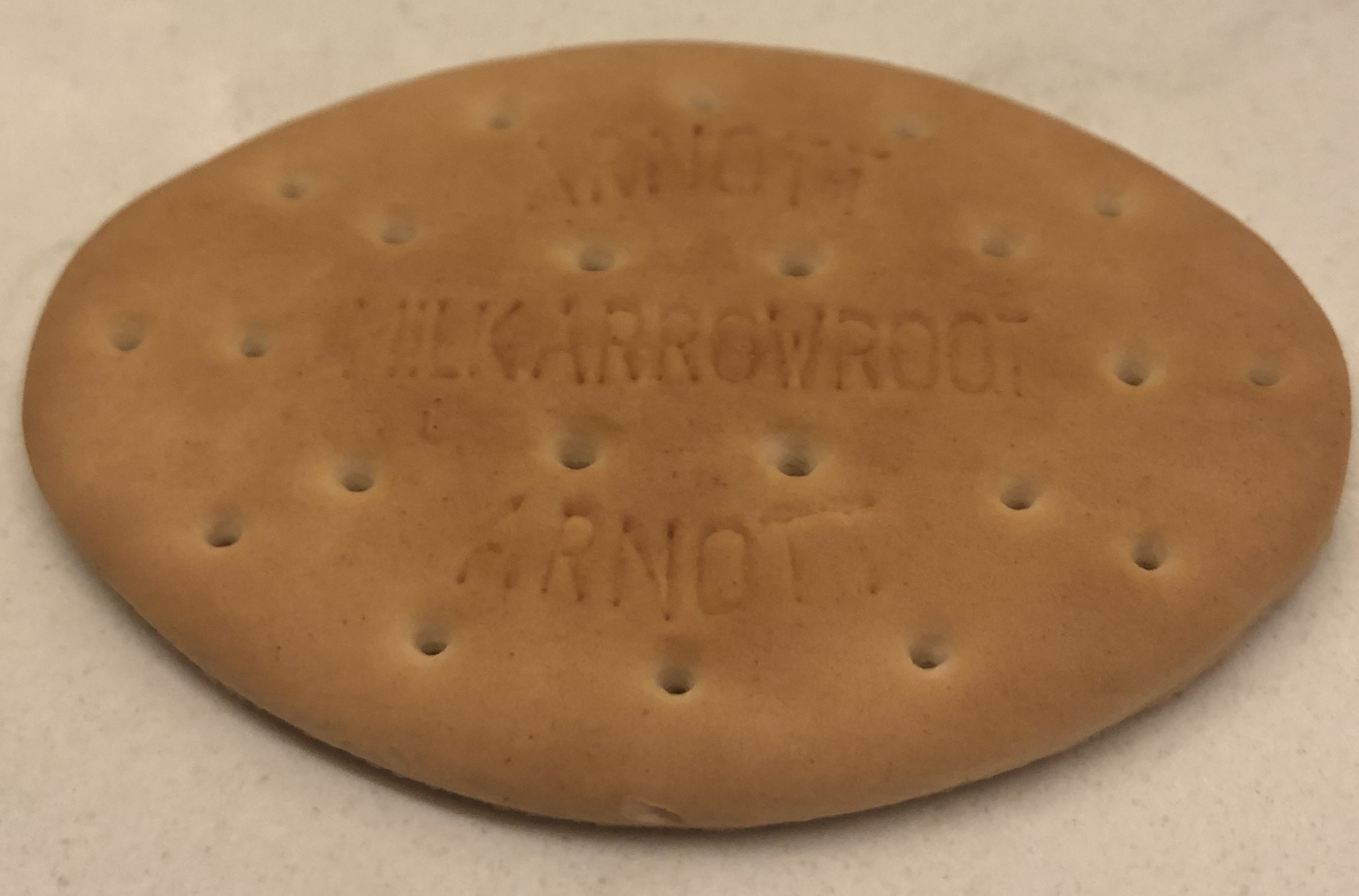
An Arnott's Milk Arrowroot Biscuit

Milk arrowroot biscuits are a soft, oval-shaped biscuit that originated in Australia, combining the plain milk biscuit and arrowroot biscuit. They have a dry texture, and are not strongly flavoured. Milk arrowroot biscuits were invented in 1882 by Arnott's Biscuits, and were marketed as a nutritious food for children and, when used to make a gruel, for babies. It sold very well, and other manufacturers soon began making their own versions. In the 1950s, they were often served buttered, and at children's parties decorated to look like faces and used in party games. They continue to be eaten in Australia, often accompanying cups of tea, and are among the less popular biscuits sold by Arnott's.

== History ==
Arnott's images of children with testimonial from 1920

Milk arrowroot biscuits were invented in 1882 by William Arnott, the Scottish-Australian found of Arnott's Biscuits, and a trademark was lodged with the Colony of New South Wales on 8 May 1888. They were marketed to children as nutritious and easy to eat, in what the food historian Barbara Santich identifies as the food health food in Australia. By 1895, they had become the company's flagship product, and the entire company was marketed under the slogan "Arnott’s Milk Arrowroot Biscuits. The Children’s Food." Although Arnott's did not advertise milk arrowroot biscuits explicitly as appropriate for babies, consumers understood that they were the intended market, as milk was not consistently pasteurised in Australia and a range of infant food products proliferated. For "very young" children, Arnott's recommended grating or crushing biscuits, sifting out large pieces. Combined with hot water, or sometimes milk, this could be fed via spoon or bottle.

Milk arrowroot biscuits sold very well, and over the following decades other Australian companies began producing milk arrowroot biscuits similar in appearance, even marked with the words "milk arrowroot biscuits". From 1900, Arnott's responded by promoting their biscuits as being of unparalleled quality. Since 1892, they had encouraged parents to send photos of their children eating the biscuits with testimonial, which they published in newspapers and advertisements, rewarding the parents with a small amount of money and a tin of the biscuits. The campaign, titled "Living Pictures" continued for 60 years, and by 1932 Arnott's proclaimed they had received over 35,000 testimonials from parents. One representative testimonial, published in the Brisbane Courier in January 1902 read: "Dear Sir, I now enclose the photo of my baby, Alice, aged 5 months, weight 26 lb., fed from birth on your Milk Arrowroot Biscuits. Has two teeth."

1929 advertisement

Other manufacturers soon copied Arnott's advertising approach. Unlike Arnott's, however, they explicitly marketed their products as ideal for children, with one 1905 advertisement from Swallow and Ariell attesting to their milk arrowroot biscuit's "wonderful baby-rearing qualities", which were "the Safest baby food that can possibly be obtained". The broad acceptance this narrative of milk arrowroot biscuits being healthy for infants led to a decades long campaign by nutritionists for parents to stop feeding children biscuits. A 1958 edition of the New South Wales government publication Our Babies warned:

The use of arrowroot biscuits for infant feeding cannot be too strongly condemned, especially WHEN GIVEN BETWEEN MEALS. These biscuits when mixed with warm water or milk also form a pap which is entirely unsuited to this purpose though—like condensed milk—they may produce a big, fat baby of an unhealthy type. Those mothers who may be tempted to use condensed milk, or arrowroot biscuits because of their cheapness, should reflect that when the increased liability of the baby to contract diseases is taken into account, together with the possibility of heavier Doctor’s and Dentist’s bills...

By the 1930s, babies were less often fed on milk arrowroot biscuits, and in the post-war period, records of parents feeding babies a beverage made from milk arrowroot biscuits were rare, although actual practice may have persisted. In the 1950s, milk arrowroot biscuits were often served as snacks to children buttered. They were also a common element at children's parties, in a party game where players had to nibble biscuits into the shape of Australia, iced with the names of party guests, and decorated to resemble a face. Arnott's marketing from that decade included a free cookbook, Recipes: Arnott’s Famous Biscuits, which used milk arrowroot biscuits soaked in milk to make Orange Custard Pudding.

Milk arrowroot biscuits decorated as faces

Milk arrowroot biscuits continue to be eaten in Australia, and alongside Australian biscuits such as Tim Tams and Iced VoVos traditionally accompany cups of tea drunk in the morning. They are among the less popular biscuits sold by Arnott's, who sell them with other biscuits in Family Assorted packs. At school fêtes, milk arrowroot biscuits are often sold decorated with faces made from jelly beans and other lollies.

== See also ==
- List of biscuits and cookies
- Tim Tam

== Sources ==
- Boag, Charles (1993). The Story of Arnott's Famous Biscuits: A History & Celebration. Sydney, New South Wales: Lansdowne Publishing. ISBN 1-86302-284-8.
- Hunwick, Heather (2018). The Food and Drink of Sydney: A History. Lanham, Maryland: Rowman & Littlefield. ISBN 9781442252042.
- Risson, Toni (2015). "Australia and New Zealand". In Goldstein, Darra (ed.). The Oxford Companion to Sugar and Sweets. Oxford: Oxford University Press. ISBN 978-0-199-31339-6.
- Santich, Barbara (1995). What the Doctors Ordered: 150 Years of Dietary Advice in Australia. South Melbourne, Victoria: Hyland House. ISBN 1-875657-44-4.
- Santich, Barbara (2012). Bold Palates: Australia's Gastronomic Heritage. Kent Town, South Australia: Wakefield Press. ISBN 978-1-74305-113-9.
- Smith, Philippa Mein (April 1993). "Mothers, Babies, and the Mothers and Babies Movement: Australia Through Depression and War". Social History of Medicine. 6 (1). doi:10.1093/sochis/6.1.51.
- Thorley, Virginia (2003). "Commercial Interests and Advice on Infant Feeding: Marketing to Mothers in Postwar Queensland". Health and History. 5 (1). doi:10.2307/40111500.
- van Reyk, Paul (2021). True to the Land: A History of Food in Australia. London: Reaktion Books. ISBN 978-1-78914-406-2.
