= Arnott's Group =

Australian snack food manufacturer

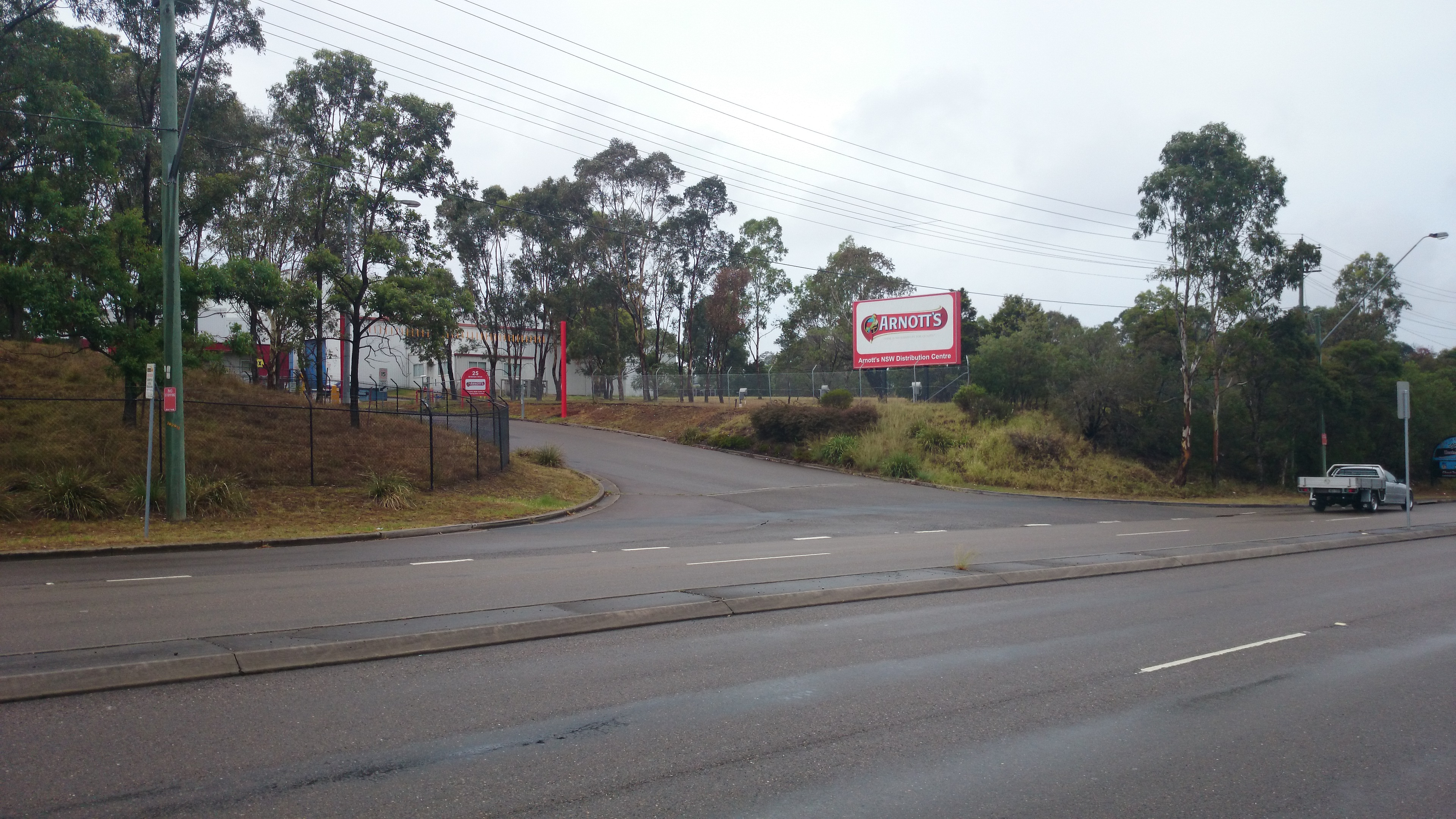
- Arnott's Distribution Centre in Huntingwood, Sydney
- Formerly: William Arnotts, Morrow; Australian Biscuit Company; Arnott's Biscuits Limited; Campbell Arnott's
- Type: Subsidiary
- Industry: Biscuits; Snack food
- Founded: 1865; 161 years ago
- Headquarters: North Strathfield, Sydney, New South Wales, Australia
- Area served: Worldwide
- Products: SAO; Jatz; Shapes; Tim Tams; Iced Vovos; Tiny Teddies; Marie; Nice; Monte Carlo; Ginger Nut; Wagon Wheels; Campbell's (outside North America and Mexico)
- Revenue: A$1.04 billion (2018)
- Parent: KKR
- Website: arnotts.com

Arnott's Group is an Australian producer of biscuits and snack food. Founded in 1865 by William Arnott, the first factory was Arnott's Steam Biscuit Factory in Newcastle, New South Wales. The company undertook several mergers and acquisitions in the 1950s and 1960s, Arnott's was acquired by Campbell's in 1997, before being sold to American global private investment company Kohlberg Kravis Roberts (KKR) in 2019, of which it is now a subsidiary. They are the largest producer of biscuits in Australia, and are particularly known for sweet varieties such as Tim Tams, Iced VoVos, and Tiny Teddies, and savoury crackers such as Jatz, Shapes and SAOs.

== History ==
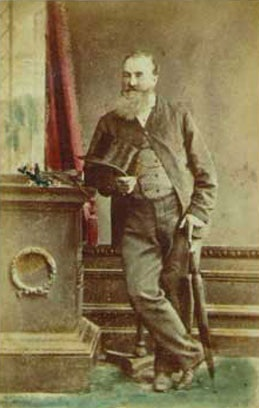
Arnott's founder William Arnott

Scottish immigrant William Arnott opened a bakery in Morpeth, New South Wales in 1847 or 1848. In 1865 he moved to a bakery on Hunter Street, Newcastle, providing bread, pies and biscuits for the townspeople and the ships docking at the local port.

In 1875, Arnott's Steam Biscuit Factory was established in Newcastle and started producing various types of plain and sweet biscuits and cakes. In the 1880s biscuits were sent from the factory to Sydney first by ship, and then later by road. A new factory began operations in Sydney in 1875.

In 1949 it merged with Morrows Pty Ltd, a Brisbane biscuit manufacturer, forming William Arnotts, Morrow Pty Ltd.

In 1950 William Arnott Pty. Ltd. purchased a half share in Adelaide biscuit manufacturers Motteram & Sons, which in 1952 became known as Arnott Motteram Ltd (or Arnott's-Motteram). Further acquisitions and mergers took place, for a while including Menz Confectionery, with the company renamed Arnott-Motteram-Menz. The Australian Biscuit Company was later renamed Arnott's Biscuits Pty Ltd. Other companies absorbed in the mergers included Brockhoff Biscuits, Guest's Biscuits in Victoria, and Mills and Ware in Western Australia.

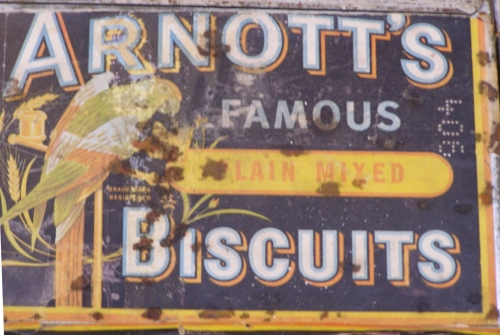
Biscuit tin on display in museum at Young, New South Wales

Until 1975 the company was under family control, with the descendants of William Arnott, including Halse Rogers Arnott and Geoffrey H. Arnott, acting as Chairman.

In 1997, Arnott's Biscuits was subject to an extortion bid by Queenslander Joy Ellen Thomas, aged 72 years, who allegedly threatened to poison packets of Arnott's Monte Carlo biscuits in South Australia and Victoria. The company conducted a massive recall and publicity campaign, publishing the extortionist's threats and demands in full-page newspaper ads. Thomas was not charged with any offence as the prosecution dropped the case against her because of conflicting evidence. The recall cost the company A$22 million, but Arnott's was praised for its openness and honesty in dealing with the crisis.

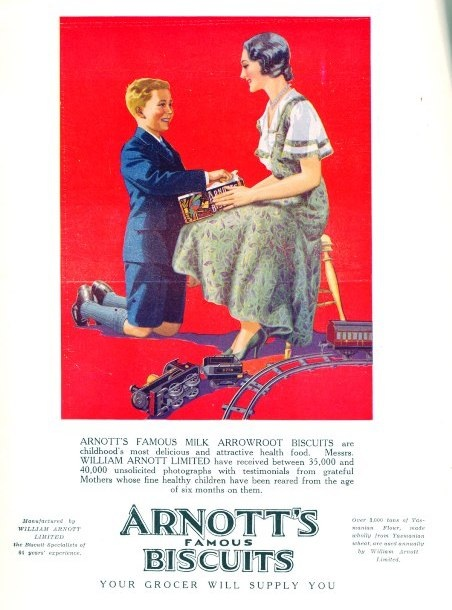
1932 advertisement for Arnott's Biscuits

In 1997, the Campbell's of North America, a shareholder of Arnott's since the 1980s, acquired Arnott's in full. Thus, in 1997, Arnott's Biscuits Ltd became a wholly owned subsidiary of the Campbell Soup Company. This caused a significant amount of controversy in Australia, based on the desire for such an Australian icon to remain in Australian hands, and a fear that Campbell's would Americanise the products.

Manufacturing of Arnott's biscuits, however, remained in Australia, and as part of a long-term expansion plan, Arnott's closed its Melbourne factory in September 2002. In the mid-2000s the company stated that it held over 70 per cent of the Australian market, with 97 per cent of Australian homes using its products.

In 2002, Arnott's acquired Snack Foods Limited. In April 2008, Campbell Arnott's sold Arnott's Snackfoods to The Real McCoy Snackfood Co. and the company became known as Snack Brands Australia.

Campbell's put Arnott's up for auction in mid- 2018. In July 2019, Campbell Soup Company agreed to sell Arnott's to Kohlberg Kravis Roberts (KKR), an American private equity group, for $US2.2 billion. Just weeks after the sale, Arnott's was in a public dispute with Woolworths, which reportedly wanted to charge higher prices for marketing displays. In August 2020, the company was renamed Arnott's Group.

In December 2020, Arnott's announced it would acquire the cereal and snack company Freedom Foods Group for A$20 million. In February 2021, Arnott's acquired a 75 per cent stake in Diver Foods. Arnott's established the Good Food Partners division to manage operations from the two acquisitions. In May 2021, Arnott's acquired the New Zealand cracker company 180degrees.

In June 2023, Arnott's opened a new factory in Avondale, New Zealand. It marked the company's return to manufacturing in the country after a 25-year absence. In August 2023, Arnott's opened a 43,000-square-metre (460,000 sq ft) automated distribution centre at its Huntingwood site in Sydney.

== Today ==
As of January 2026, the Arnott's Group is headquartered in Sydney. Its brands include Campbell's, V8, Messy Monkeys, Freedom Cereals and 180Degrees. The company has more than 4,000 employees across the Asia Pacific region, including in its manufacturing operations in Australia, New Zealand, Malaysia, and Indonesia.

Arnott's produces a wide range of foods, and is particularly known for its biscuits and snack foods. They are the largest producer of biscuits in Australia.

== Logo ==
The original Arnott's logo depicted a multi-coloured parrot sitting atop a T-shaped perch, eating a cracker biscuit. It is based on a Mexican parrot, or macaw, given to William Arnott by the captain of a fleet of coal ships when he returned to Newcastle from Scotland in the 1870s. The logo was drawn by Arnott’s daughter-in-law, and registered as a logo in 1888.

During a radio interview on ABC, William Arnott's great-great-great-grandson stated that the logo represents the proverb "Honesty is the best policy" where the phrase was constructed from "On his T, is the best pol' (polly) I see".

In 2020 Arnott’s announced a new corporate logo, incorporating a modern, streamlined version of the parrot. Australian consumers were shocked at the change, but the original logo was retained on the Australian biscuits.

== Products ==
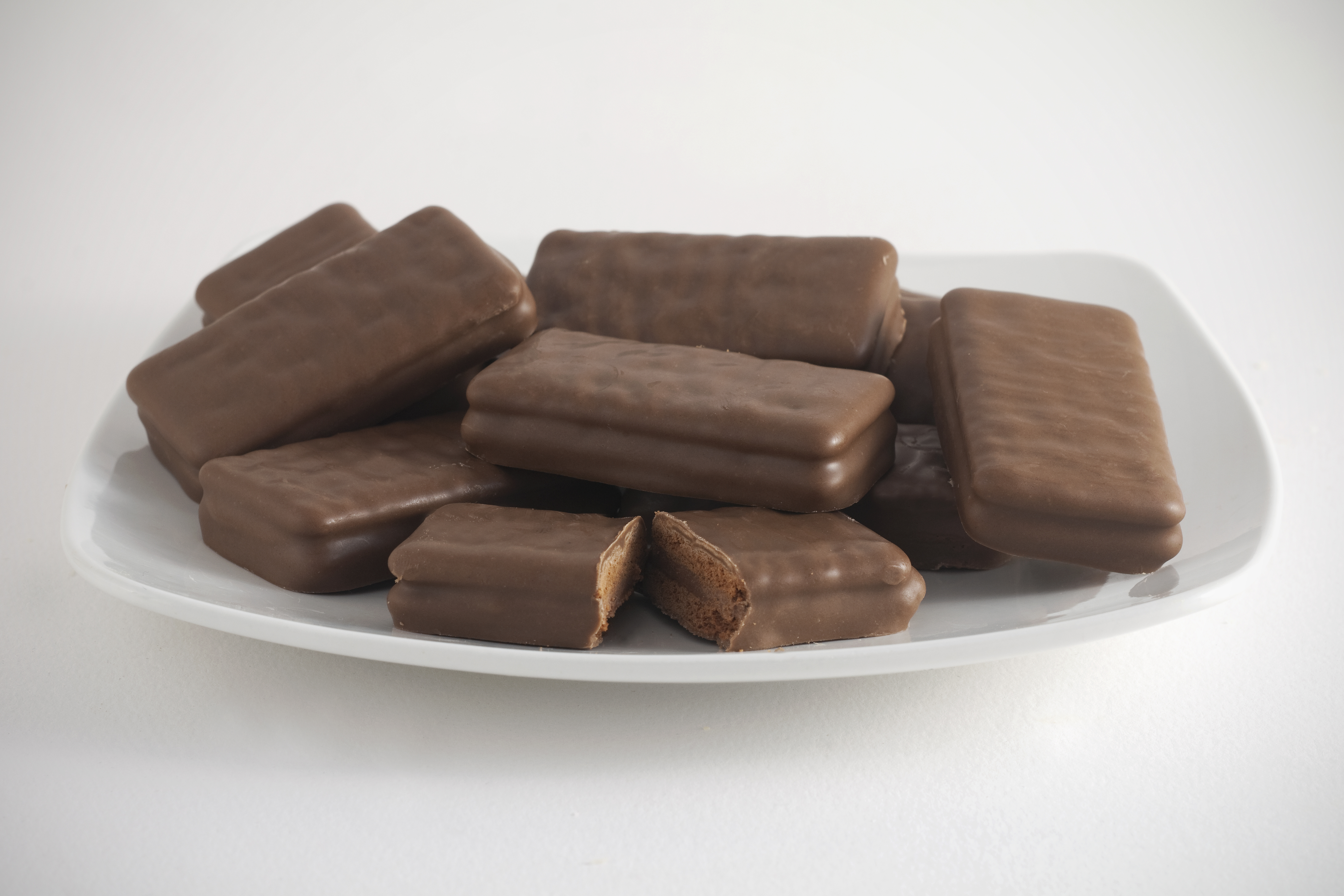
A plate of Tim Tams

Arnott's are well known in Australia and internationally for producing several quintessentially Australian biscuits. Some of their major products include:

- Adora Cream Wafers: vanilla wafers. (Discontinued)
- Arno Shortbread: traditional shortbread flavour
- Bush Biscuits: developed by Adelaide company Motteram & Williamson, similar to an arrowroot biscuit, but larger and harder, made for camping. (Discontinued)
- Butternut Snap
- Caramel Crowns: a plain biscuit, topped with caramel, and covered in chocolate
- Cherry Crowns: cherry marshmallow on cherry sauce on a biscuit base dipped in chocolate. Shaped like a Bundt cake.
- Cheds: a savoury cracker that is perforated and sprinkled with cheddar cheese and salt
- Chocolate Butternut Snap: a crunchy oatmeal and coconut biscuit covered in chocolate
- Chocolate Dessert: a chocolate cream sandwiched between two chocolate biscuits; discontinued in 2005 due to low sales
- Chocolate Monte: a golden syrup, honey and coconut biscuit covered in dark chocolate
- Chocolate Mousse.
- Choc Ripple: a chocolate-flavoured biscuit that is commonly used by Australian home cooks as the basis of 'Chocolate Ripple Cake or Tassie Tiramisu' by adding layers of freshly whipped cream between each layer of biscuit and covering the whole construction in more cream and is then refrigerated overnight
- Chocolate Royals: a vanilla biscuit topped with various flavours of marshmallow coated in dark or milk chocolate, similar to the Scottish Tunnock's teacake or New Zealand's mallowpuffs. The royal comes in two versions: dark chocolate (with white marshmallow) and milk chocolate (with pink marshmallow)
- Chocolate Sticks: rounded stick biscuits covered in chocolate.
- Chocolate Wheaten: a product acquired after Campbell's takeover. A round, semi-sweet, whole wheat flour biscuit covered in either milk chocolate or dark chocolate. Brand acquired from George Weston Foods in 2003
- Clix: a round savoury cracker but more buttery and saltier than Jatz with a softer texture
- Coconut Rings: a coconut biscuit shaped in a ring. Discontinued after Campbell's takeover
- Coconut Rough: circa 1960s.
- Cracker Chips: A cross between a cracker and a chip. Available in Honey Soy Chicken, Balsamic Vinegar & Sea Salt, and Three Cheese flavours.
- Creamy Chocolate: Rectangular chocolate biscuits with a hint of ginger, with vanilla cream in the middle (discontinued).
- Cruskits: a large rectangular crisp snack bread very much like Melba toast, available in Original, Corn, Light, Rice and Rye varieties
- Custard Cream: a custard cream filling sandwiched between two rectangular vanilla biscuits
- Delta Cream: two round chocolate biscuits with vanilla cream in the middle, similar to an Oreo, but sweeter and not so much cocoa
- Farmbake: Available in Chocolate Chip, Triple Choc, Chocolate Chip Fudge, Butter Shortbread, Golden Crunch, Peanut Brownie, Crunchy Oat & Fruit flavours.
- Flatbread Dippers: oven roasted flatbread crisps, introduced in 2022. Available in Olive & Fetta, Parmesan & Basil, and Sesame & Middle Eastern Spice flavours.
- Ginger Nut: A hard, crisp ginger biscuit. Arnott's manufactures four different regional varieties of ginger nut to suit the tastes of people in different states.
- Fruit and Nut: fruit and nuts on a biscuit covered in chocolate.
- Gaiety: Chocolate-coated wafers.
- Geneva: Oval biscuit with one side chocolate coated.
- Golliwog/Scalliwag: a biscuit made in the shape of the Golliwog toy, which was first sold in the 1960s and popular at that time. The name was changed to Scalliwag in the mid-1990s, however the biscuits remained in the shape of a Golliwog and the product was discontinued by the late 1990s. They made a reappearance in shops in 2010 but seem to have been removed from production again. Originally a Guest's Biscuits product.
- Goldfish: a type of snack crackers that shaped like a goldfish. (Discontinued)
- Granita
- Chocolate Granita: Granita with one side chocolate coated.
- Fruit Granita: Granita with currants.
- Honey Bar: circa 1960s.
- Hazelnut Chocolate: biscuits with hazelnut cream, covered in chocolate.
- Honey and Almond: Similar to a Tim Tam. Circa 1970.
- Honey Jumbles: small soft honey gingerbread cakes, topped with pink or white icing. Discontinued in July 2021 due to low sales.
- Honey Snaps: Honey and coconut flat biscuit. (Discontinued)
- Hundreds & Thousands: a vanilla biscuit topped with pink icing and coated with tiny multicoloured nonpareils.
- Iced Animals: created by the new owner Robert Arnott, animal shaped biscuits with pink, green, yellow, and orange icing on top.

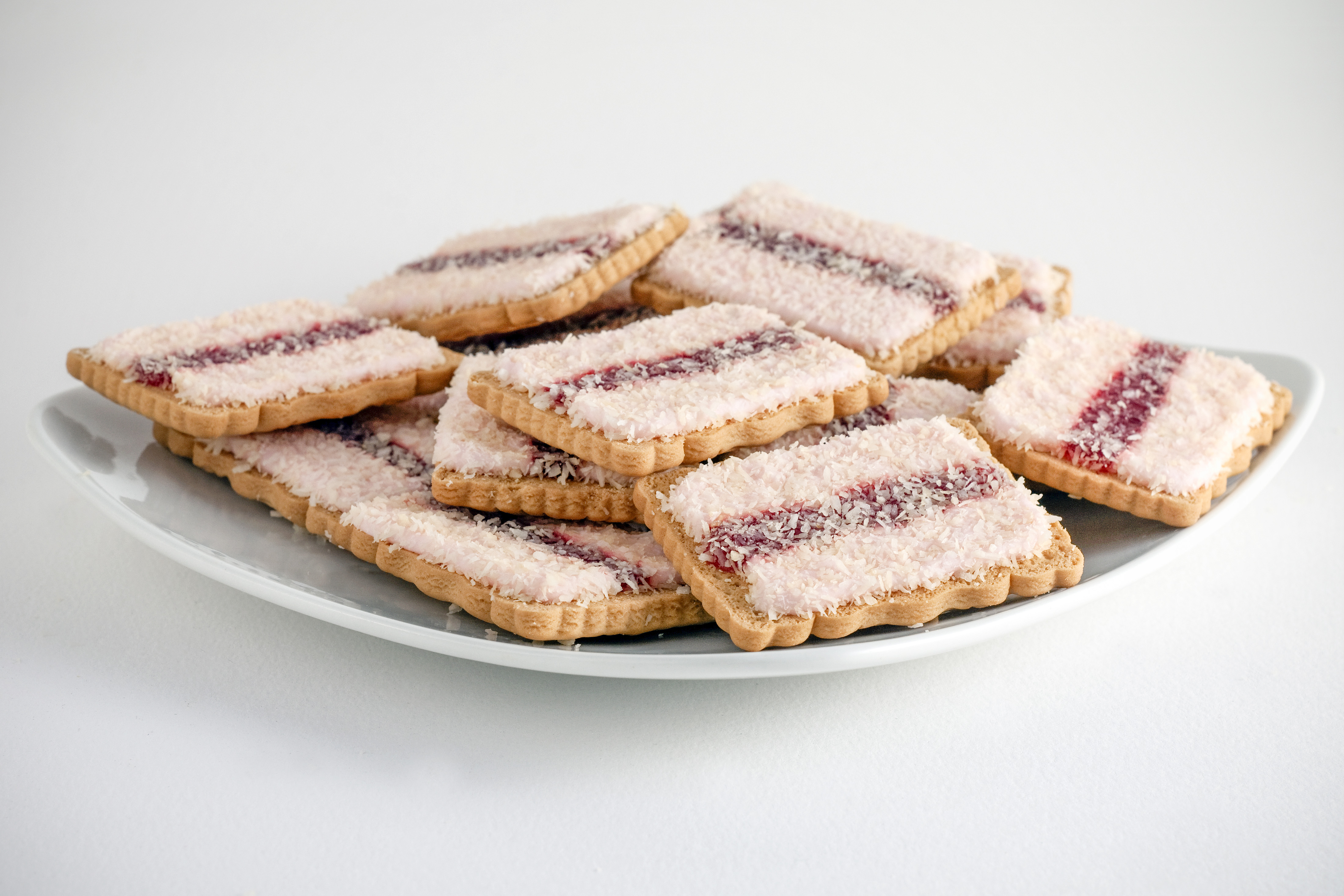
Iced VoVos

- Iced VoVos: a wheat flour biscuit with a raspberry jam and fondant topping sprinkled with coconut.
- Jaffa Cakes: a soft sponge with orange jam and coated with chocolate. (Discontinued)
- Jatz: a round savoury crisp cracker, lightly salted, also available in a cracked pepper flavoured variety.
- Kingstons: small round coconut biscuits with chocolate cream in the middle.
- Lattice: (Discontinued)
- Lemon Crisps: two sweet crackers with a light sprinkling of salt and lemon cream sandwiched in between.
- Malt-O-Milk: a sweet biscuit containing malt extract, milk powder and food colour.
- Marie: a sweet, vanilla-flavoured biscuit similar to a rich tea biscuit.
- Maryland Cookies: a superior very short choc chip cookie with hazelnut chips. First discontinued as a stand alone biscuit but still available in the Classic Assorted, then discontinued altogether.
- Milk Coffee: a sweet biscuit with a hint of golden syrup.
- Milk Arrowroot: historical flagship biscuit brand of Arnott's, made with Arrowroot flour, but only enough that the name Arrowroot can still be used on the label, once was commonly given to babies to introduce them to solid food.
- Mint Slice: a round chocolate biscuit topped with mint flavoured cream and coated in dark chocolate. Also available in Mandarin, Kahlua, and Coconut flavours.

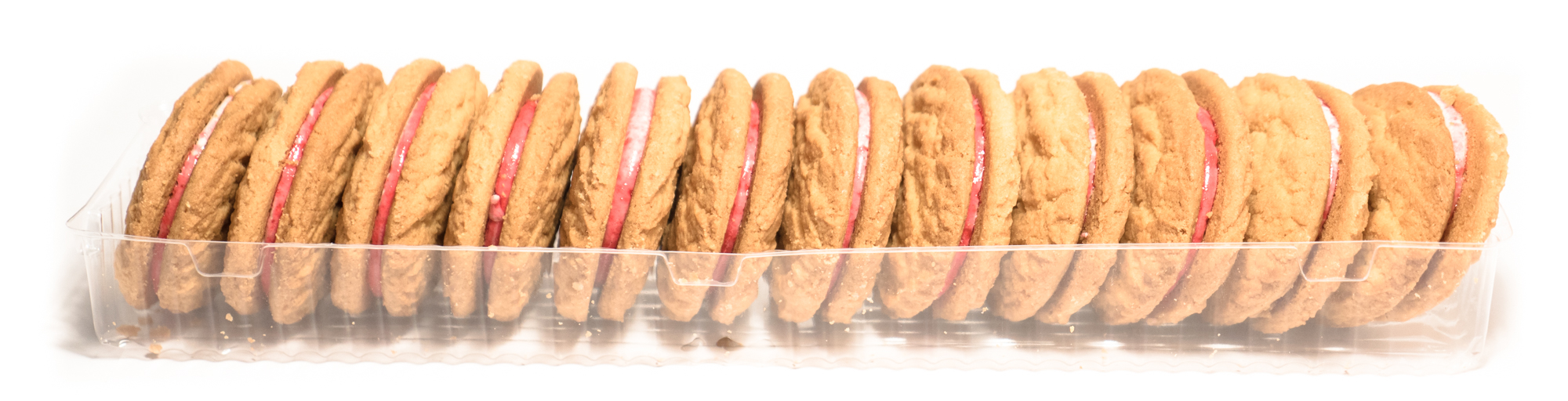
A packet of Monte Carlo biscuits

- Mintina: mint wafer covered in chocolate.
- Monte Carlo: a raspberry and cream fondant sandwiched between two golden syrup, honey and coconut biscuits. Widely considered the most popular within the Arnott's Assorted Cream range.
- Morning Coffee: (Discontinued)
- Nice: a sweet biscuit covered with granulated sugar.
- Nutty Pops.
- Obsession: chocolate biscuits, introduced in 2022. Available in Milk Chocolate, Salted Caramel, Dark Chocolate, and Mint Chocolate flavours.
- Orange Creams: two vanilla biscuits with orange cream in the middle.
- Orange Slice: Two circular biscuits imprinted with a design based on a real orange slice, with orange cream in the middle.
- Quatro: chocolate-coated biscuits with toppings such as fruit and nut, or caramel. Brand acquired from George Weston Foods in 2003. As of late 2010, no longer in production
- Raspberry Shortcake: a biscuit base with raspberry filling then topped with a doughnut shaped biscuit and sprinkled with granulated sugar
- Ricco: biscuit topped with rice crisps and covered in chocolate.
- Salada: a salted crisp cracker, rectangular in shape but with perforations down its centre to allow it to be halved for hors d'oeuvres. Originally a Brockhoff product.

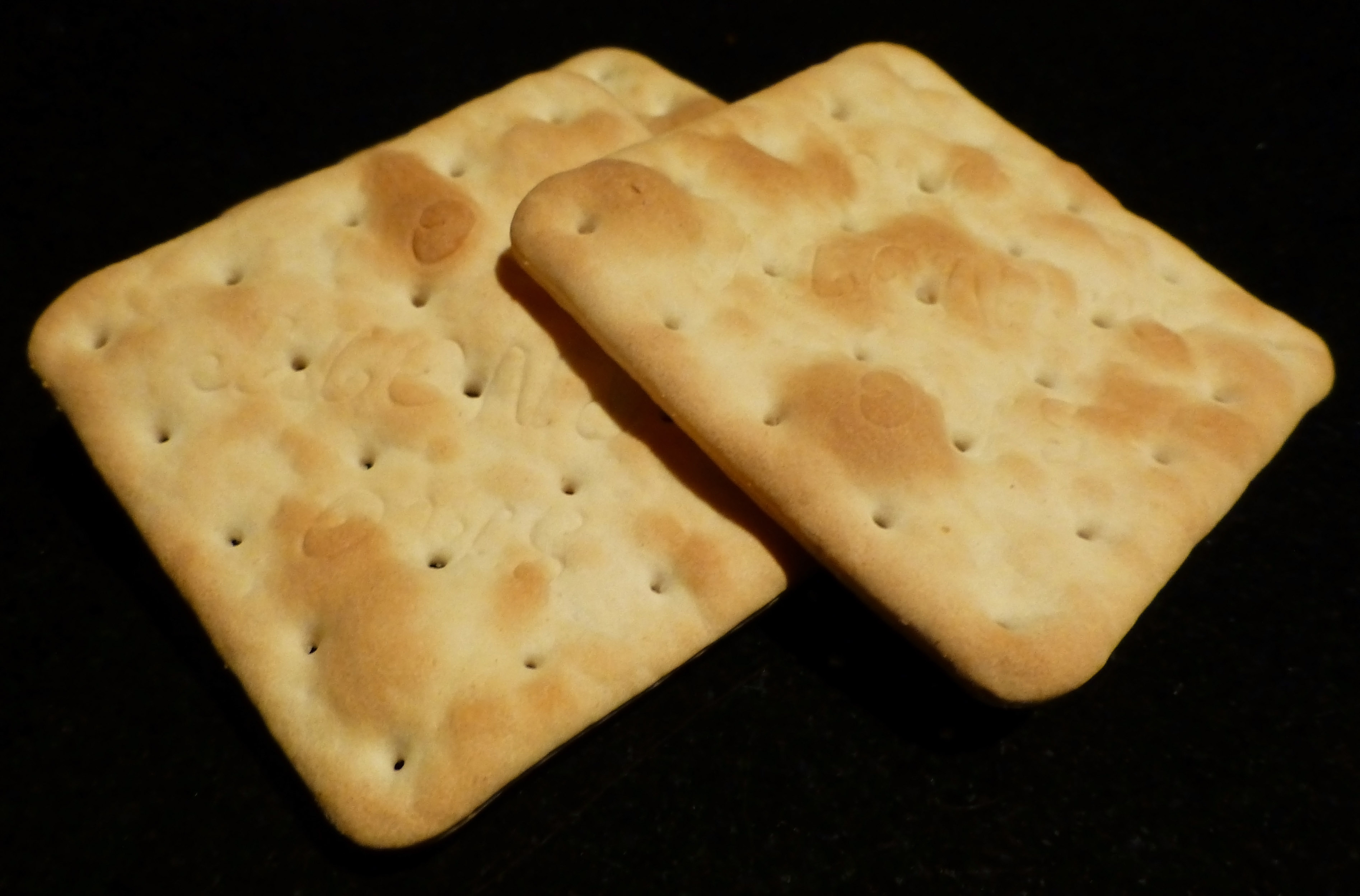
SAO biscuits

- SAO: a large square-shaped, plain cracker biscuit. The name may stand for "Salvation Army Officer" as the biscuit was likely made especially for the Salvation Army Officers of the day as a snack that they could carry with them on their visiting rounds.
- Savoy: a crispy cracker. Originally only sold in Victoria, South Australia, and Tasmania but later available in New South Wales, the Australian Capital Territory, and Queensland. Originally a Brockhoff product.
- Scotch fingers: shortbread biscuit, also available chocolate-coated. Introduced in 1906, and originally known as "Kiel Fingers" until renamed in around 1914 due to anti-German sentiment. Ingredients include vegetable oil, wheat starch, condensed milk, salt, eggs, and baking powder, all of which are not normally used to make shortbread. Should be snapped in half along the line between the fingers before being eaten.
- Sesame wheats: savoury cracker topped with toasted sesame seeds.
- Sevilla: Shaped like a flower with a centre hole.'swirled with creamy frosting...topped with tangy orange-candy chips'. !973.

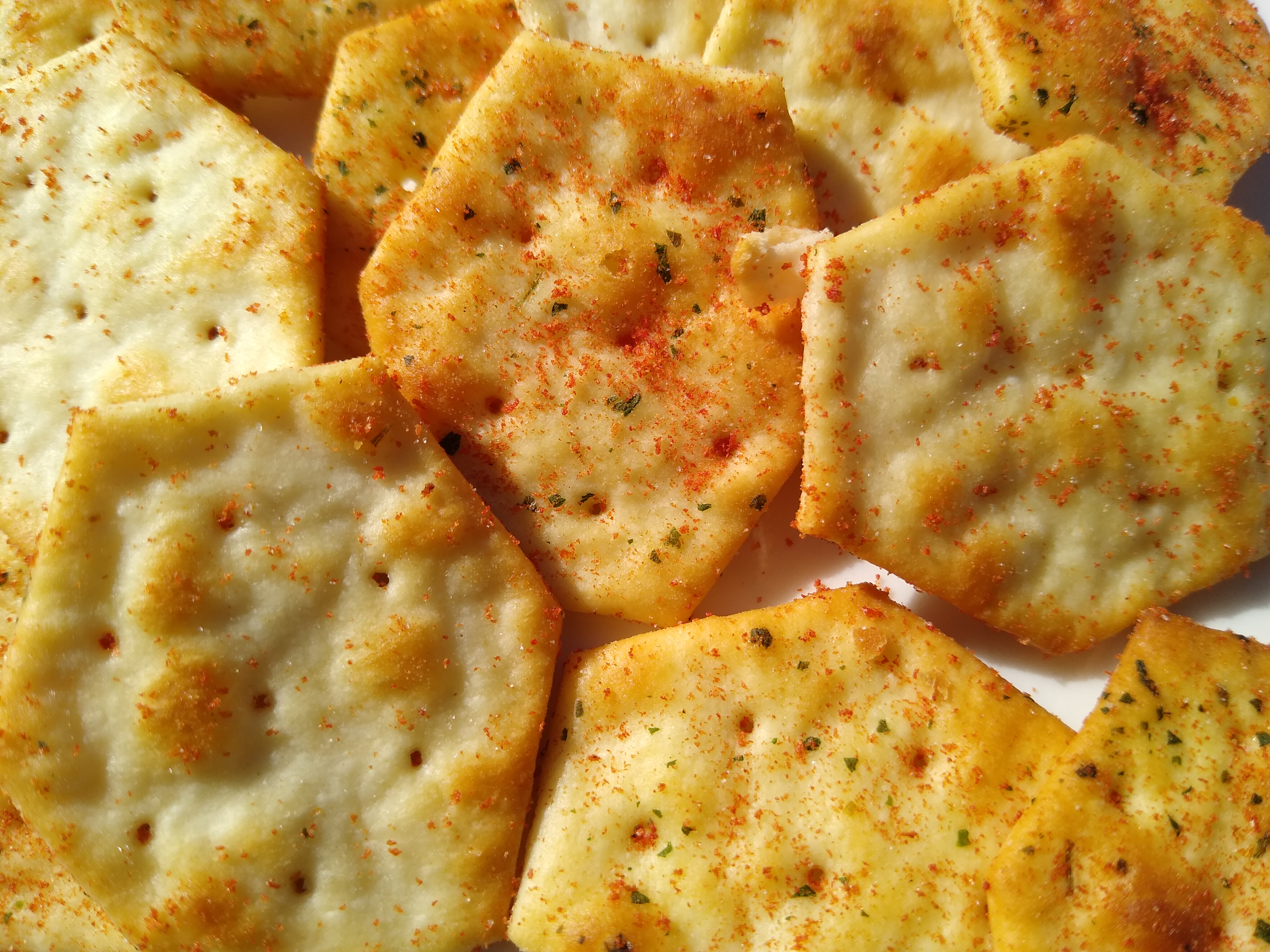
Shapes

- Shapes: savoury crackers with sprinkled flavourings. Flavours include: Barbecue, Pizza, Cheddar, Chicken Crimpy, Nacho Cheese, and Cheese & Bacon.
- Shortbread creams: two vanilla shortbreads with vanilla cream in the centre.
- Shredded Wheatmeal: from the original plain biscuit line with the major addition of wheatmeal.
- Sourdough Crisps: crisps made with sourdough starter, introduced in 2022. Available in Cheddar & Roasted Garlic and Cracked Pepper & Thyme flavours.
- Spicy Fruit Roll: a pillow shaped, spicy fruit mix covered with plain biscuit covering. Colloquially known as the "pillow biscuit".
- Tartlets: a tart base with jam in the centre. Flavours: strawberry, raspberry, lemon, apricot, and blackberry.
- Teddy Bear Biscuits: biscuits shaped like a teddy bear. Also comes in a chocolate coated variety. They are a different product to Tiny Teddies. Originally a Guest's Biscuits product.
- TeeVee Snacks: a bite-sized chocolate coated biscuit, promoted as being ideal for TV snacking. Originally a Guest's Biscuits product.
- Tic Tocs: Round iced vanilla biscuits, with clock faces embossed on the underside.
- Tim Tams: a two-layered oblong chocolate-coated biscuit originally with a chocolate cream filling. Flavours now include milk chocolate, white chocolate, dark chocolate, double coating of chocolate, and caramel centre. Tim Tams are regularly released with limited edition flavours, either added as an additional layer of filling, or via flavoured chocolate.
- Tina Wafer: a sweet cream sandwiched between two light wafers. Varieties include chocolate, strawberry and vanilla.
- Tiny Teddies: thumb-sized teddy bear-shaped snacks. Practically identical to the American Nabisco brand Teddy Grahams
- Triple Wafer
- Venetians: a sweet round coconut biscuit with chewy dried currants. One side dipped in a sweet white chocolate icing.
- Vita-Weat: wholewheat crisp bread available in original and sandwich size. plain and multi-grain. Brand acquired from Peek Freans in 1982.

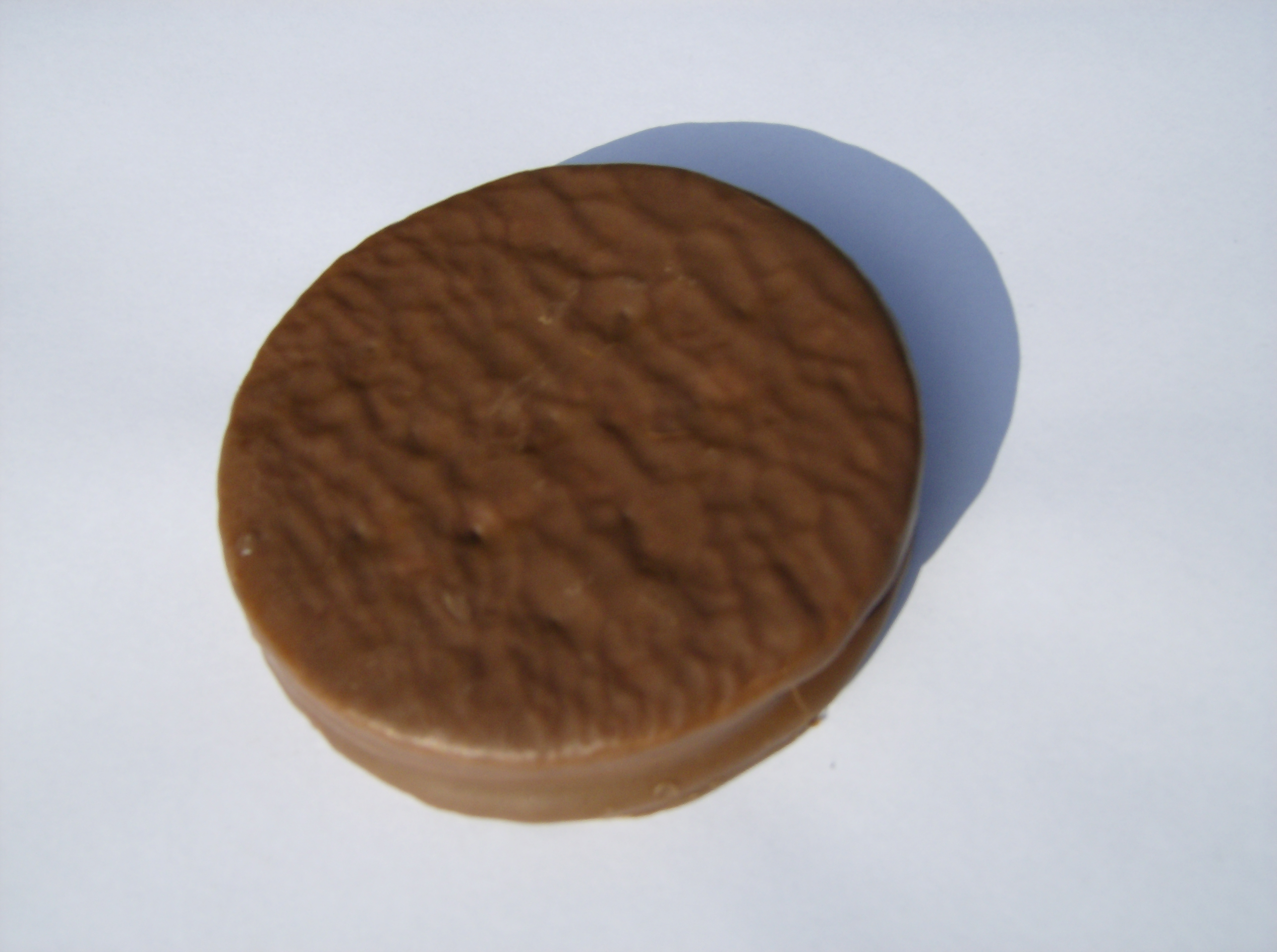
Wagon Wheel

- Wagon Wheels: marshmallow and jam sandwiched between two large round biscuits, coated in chocolate (original variety); also available with chocolate fudge in place of jam (double choc variety). Usually sold in packs of one. The original brand was acquired from George Weston Foods in 2003.
- Water crackers: original, sesame, and cracked pepper.
- Yo-Yo: a sweet biscuit originally developed by Adelaide company W. Menz & Co.
