= Cecil Augustus Motteram =

Australian baker (1853-1943)

Cecil Augustus Motteram (1853 – 13 June 1943) was an Australian baker, born in England. He founded a biscuit-making enterprise in Adelaide, South Australia, first known as Motteram & Williamson, then Motteram & Sons, which was later taken over by Arnott's and renamed Arnott's-Motteram. The company, through various mergers and acquisitions, was the precursor to Arnott's Biscuits.

== Early years ==
Cecil Augustus Motteram was born in 1853 in London, England, the third son of solicitor John Philip Motteram (ca.1817 – 23 April 1890). The family emigrated to Australia in 1858 on the Tornado and John Motteram established a practice in Bendigo (then known as Sandhurst) in the colony of Victoria.

Cecil Motteram studied law and entered practice with his father for a while after completing his education, but left the practice to become assistant librarian at the Bendigo Mechanics Institute, where he stayed for two years.

== Career ==
Motteram moved to the colony of South Australia in 1873, where he was employed by the Aerated Bread Company on Waymouth Street, in Adelaide city centre.

By 1881 he was the company's manager. The company's products included Pilot Bread, Cabin Bread, Adelaide biscuits, Abernethy biscuits, Arrowroot biscuits, and Bush Biscuits.

In 1892 Motteram and fellow-employee engineer Edward Williamson (c.1864 – 27 July 1927) took over its operation, and as Motteram & Williamson bought the business in 1894.

In 1909 Motteram left to start his own company, opening a new factory at the western end of Grote Street in 1910. His son, Walter Motteram, joined him after a period of studying biscuit manufacture in England, the business was renamed Motteram & Sons Ltd. in that year. Another son, Philip Motteram, after graduating with a Bachelor of Engineering degree at the University of Adelaide, joined the company in 1919.

Motteram's slogan was "Progress", and his factories, which employed 130 people in 1927, worked in excellent conditions. Some of the employees had gained experience in Europe, and the latest machinery was used to make the biscuits. Only a few ingredients were imported, the majority being source in Australia.

Williamson continued as E. Williamson & Co. in Waymouth Street; he sold the business to E. Williamson Ltd, a company in which he had no interest, in 1924 – three years before his death.

Cecil Motteram died on 13 June 1943, after which his son Philip became chairman of the firm.

In 1950 William Arnott Pty. Ltd. of Sydney purchased a half share in the company, which in 1952 became known as Arnott Motteram Ltd.

More acquisitions and mergers took place, for a while including Menz Confectionery, with the company renamed Arnott-Motteram-Menz. It later became the Australian Biscuit Company and eventually renamed Arnott's Biscuits.

=== Continuing brands ===
Motteram's Arrowroot, Coffee, and Bush Biscuits, as well as Menz Yo-Yo biscuits, are still manufactured by Arnott's under their original names.

== Personal life and death ==
Motteram married Ada Elliot on 29 March 1881. They had two daughters, Ethel and Gertrude, and two sons, Philip and Walter.

Motteram died on at home at 23 Pier Street, Glenelg. His remains were interred at the Church of England cemetery in Mitcham.

The sons and a grandson, John Philip Motteram, were involved in the business and continued to manage the company after Cecil's death. In November 1946, Philip Motteram became president of the South Australian Chamber of Manufactures.

The State Library of South Australia holds the records of Motteram Family Biscuits Co. 1897-1964.

== See also ==
Contemporary bakers in South Australia include:

- Murray & Son, biscuit makers of Coromandel Valley
- Matthew Madge baker of Moonta Street and (briefly) MHA
- William Menz
