= William Arnott (biscuit manufacturer) =

Scottish-Australian biscuit company founder

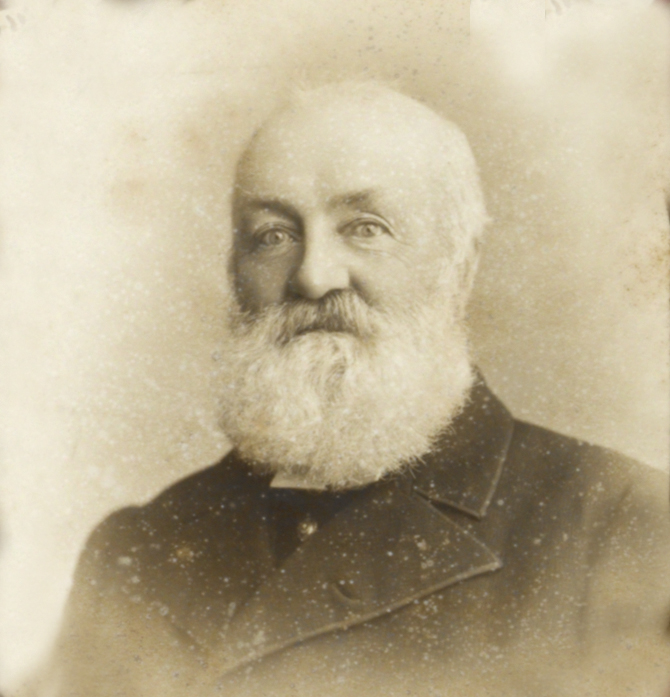
- Arnott in c. 1899
- Born: 6 December 1827; Pathhead, Scotland
- Died: 22 July 1901 (aged 73); New South Wales, Australia
- Citizenship: Australian
- Organization: Arnott's Biscuits Holdings
- Spouses: Monica Sinclair (m. 1848; died 1865) Margarete McLean Fleming (m. 1865)
- Children: 12

William Arnott (6 December 1827 – 22 July 1901) was a Scottish-born Australian baker and businessman. After emigrating to New South Wales in 1848, he worked as a baker and later founded a biscuit-making business in Newcastle, which became the basis of Arnott's Biscuits Holdings.

== Early life ==
William Arnott was born 6 December 1827, in Pathhead, Fife, Scotland, the eldest of eight children. His father was David Millie and his mother was Isobella Arnott. In October 1847, he and his brother David set out for Sydney, Australia on board the assisted-immigrants' ship Sir Edward Parry; they reached Sydney some 135 days later, on 17 February 1848.

== Career ==
=== Arnott's Biscuits ===
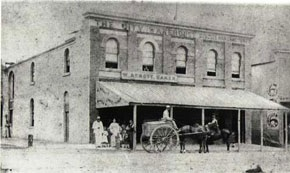
The William Arnott's Steam Biscuit Factory in Newcastle, New South Wales (photographed circa 1868)

After arriving in Australia, he first started a baking company in Morpeth, New South Wales, 22 miles north-west of Newcastle. He continued working as a baker, together with David, for three years. Arnott decided to try his luck gold mining in 1851, and left for the Turon River diggings alone. He was not successful; he failed to find any gold and eventually returned to life as a baker. In 1865, Arnott established the William Arnott's Steam Biscuit Factory in Newcastle, New South Wales. It was so named as his biscuit-making machines (or "rotary ovens") were steam-powered. In 1894, Arnott employed numerous workers after purchasing a biscuit factory in Forest Lodge, Sydney; his biscuits had already begun shipping to Sydney in 1882. The factory in Forest Lodge was relocated to Homebush circa 1908. During his career as a biscuit manufacturer, Arnott came up with the Milk Arrowroot biscuits, a combination of arrowroot biscuits and plain milk biscuits; they were marketed as "children's food" and were very popular, to the extent that other rival companies tried to come up with imitations of the Milk Arrowroot biscuits. Arnott also produced Tim Tam, Jatz and SAO biscuits.

== Personal life ==
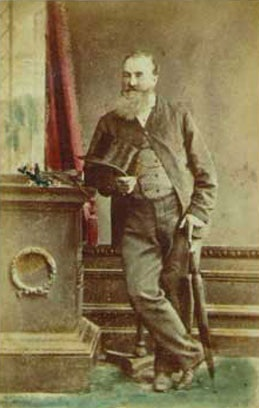
William Arnott, c. 1869

William Arnott was a prominent member of the Wesleyan Church and taught Sunday school for close to 25 years. In 1848, Arnott wed Monica Sinclair, who already had four children at the time of the marriage; Sinclair died aged 36 on 11 April 1865. That same year, Arnott married Margarete McLean Fleming. She assisted him in his baking business and they had eight children. His son William was also a baker and his daughter, Margaret Oppen, was a noted artist and embroiderer. It is not in the Australian Dictionary of Biography but his father David Millie Arnott had been transported here for breach of trust, fraud and embezzlement following sentence in 1837.

== Death and legacy ==
On 22 July 1901, Arnott died at his ‘Arnottholme’ residence aged 73. Shortly after his death, Arnott's sons spread out the business to other parts of the world, including East Asia and South Africa.
