= Nice biscuit =

Biscuit

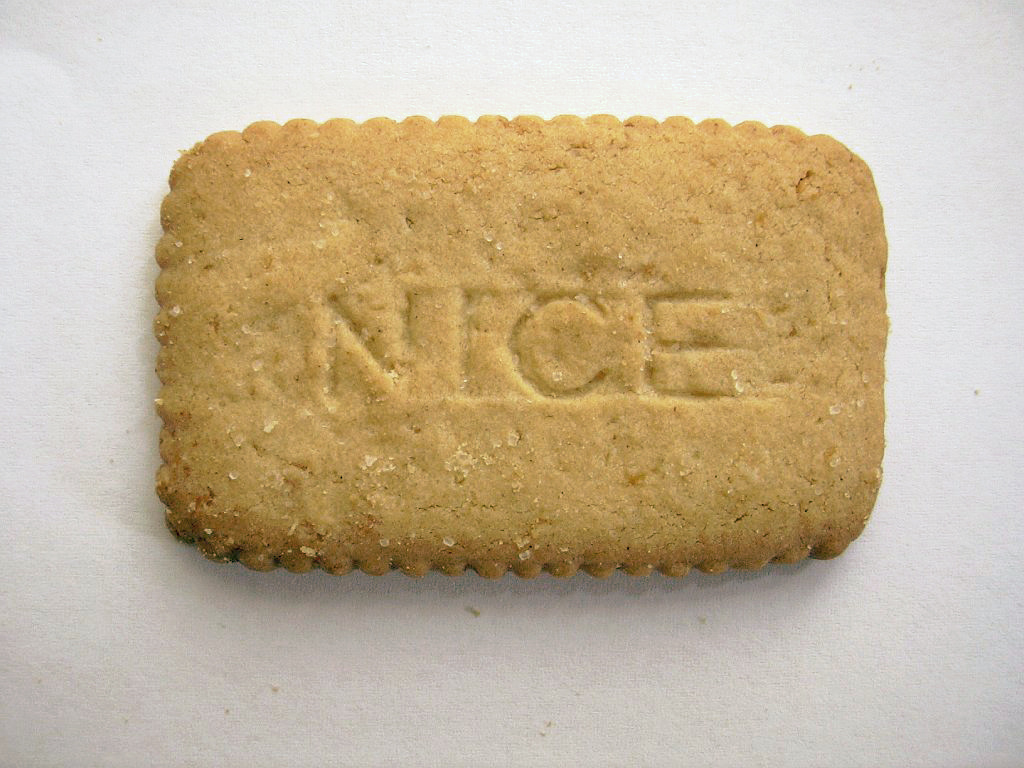
- Type: Biscuit
- Main ingredients: Coconut flavouring

A Nice biscuit (pronounced /ˈniːs/ NEESS, like the name of the French city) is a type of plain or coconut-flavoured biscuit. It is thin, rectangular in shape, with crenulated edges, lightly covered with a scattering of large sugar crystals and often with the word "NICE" imprinted on top in sans-serif capital letters. It is often served as an accompaniment to hot drinks, such as tea.

The name probably derives from the city of Nice in the south of France. 1929 editions of the Hull Daily Mail carried an advertisement for Huntley & Palmers Nice biscuits using the phrase "Delightful as the town after which they are named", indicating that by this point their manufacturers intended the public to associate the biscuit with the French city, whether or not that had been the intended pronunciation.

A Nice biscuit was listed in an Army and Navy Co-operative Society price list in 1895. The British company Huntley & Palmers made a Nice biscuit as early as 1904.

The Australian company Arnott also claims to have invented the Nice biscuit. Nice biscuits are sold by various companies under different brand names in much of the Commonwealth of Nations as well as other countries.

The Dutch biscuit maker Verkade claims its Nizza version (introduced in 1910) is the Netherlands' "most beloved cookie", and in 2010 celebrated the company's 125th anniversary with the release of a new cinnamon variant.
