= Iced VoVo =

Australian biscuit

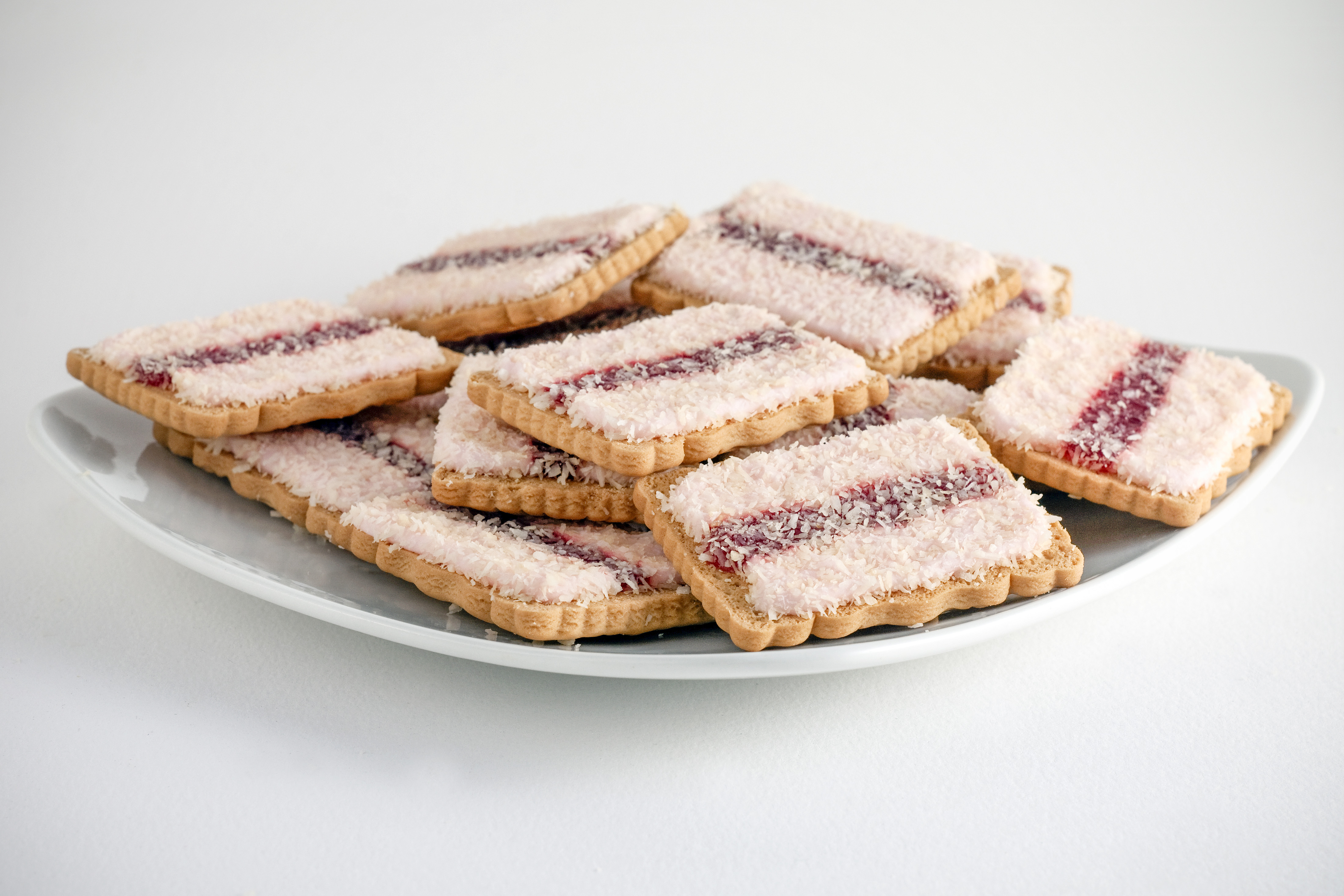
A plate of Iced VoVo biscuits

An Iced VoVo is a wheat flour biscuit topped with two strips of pink fondant flanking a strip of raspberry jam and sprinkled with coconut. It is a product of the Australian-based biscuit company Arnott's. Previously known as Iced Vo-Vo biscuits, the trademark was registered in 1906.

On 24 November 2007, Australian Prime Minister Kevin Rudd made a light-hearted mention of Iced VoVos in his election victory speech, jokingly urging his team to have a strong cup of tea with an Iced VoVo before getting to work. This reportedly led to skyrocketing Iced VoVo sales, prompting Arnott's to send a shipping pallet of the biscuits to the Prime Minister's office in Canberra's Parliament House.

Several limited edition Iced Vovo-inspired products have been released over the years. In 2017, Arnott's and Peters Ice Cream partnered to release an Iced VoVo ice cream. Iced VoVo-inspired ice cream was released again in 2026 by Coles. Iced VoVo-inspired hot cross buns were released by Coles in 2024 and 2026. Iced VoVo-inspired Tim Tams were released in 2026.

A similar product to Iced VoVo called Mikado has been sold in Ireland by Jacob's since 1888.
