= Margaret Oppen =

Australian artist (1890–1975)

- crop from "Letters from Daisy"
- Born: Margaret "Daisy" Arnott; 8 July 1890; Newcastle, New South Wales
- Died: 17 June 1975 (aged 84); Royal North Shore Hospital, Sydney
- Education: Slade School of Art et al
- Occupation: artist
- Known for: embroidery
- Spouse: Hans Oppen
- Relatives: William Arnott (grandfather)

Margaret Oppen born Margaret "Daisy" Arnott (1890 – 1975) was an Australian artist, correspondent and embroiderer. She founded the Embroiderers' Guild branch in New South Wales. Her letters to her mother have been published as "Letters from Daisy".

== Life ==
Oppen was born in 1890 in Newcastle, New South Wales. Her mother was "Polly" Mary Eleanor, (born Dixon) and she called Margaret, "Daisy". Her father was William Arnott and his father was William Arnott known for making biscuits. Her parents frequently went to Britain and she went along. She obtained her artistic training in Sydney and London. In Sydney she studied at Julian Rossi Ashton's school and in London she attended the Grosvenor School of Modern Art and the Slade School of Fine Art.

In 1924 she was cutting blocks and one of her woodcuts appeared in Art in Australia that year. In the following year her lino-cuts were in the Younger Group of Australian Artists exhibition in Sydney. She was in Britain in 1929 when she began to write letters to her mother in Australia telling her of her new son, Conrad. She returned to Australia in 1934/5 with her husband, Hans Oppen, and their two children.

During the war she assisted with occupational therapy and after it she went to work at the Ethleen Palmer's Double Bay studio of the Society of Arts and Crafts. There she created embroidery working with Ann Gilmour Rees and Dora Sweetapple. In 1949 she and Ethleen Palmer held a joint exhibition at Sydney's Grovesnor Galeries where Palmer showed her silk screen prints and Oppen showed her embroidery. The embroidery was unusual because it was freehand. Oppen did not sketch or fund an image, but she would create embroidery on household items such as tablecloths and aprons.

Oppen went to study again in London at the Royal School of Needlework and she joined the Embroiderers Guild. When she returned to Sydney she led a group who decided to open a branch of the guild in New South Wales. With permission of the guild's patron, Queen Mary, the branch was formed in 1955.

In 1967 she was teaching in evening classes as part of the Embroiderers' Guild of N.S.W. Summer School.

== Death and legacy ==
Oppen died in Sydney at the Royal North Shore Hospital in 1975. Every two years the Embroidery Guild of New South Wales has an open competition that is named in her honour as a founding member. In 2023 the prize was $500. The letters that she wrote home to her mother have been the basis of a limited publication titled "Letters from Daisy" created by members of her family.
