= Monte Carlo (biscuit) =

Type of Australian sweet biscuit

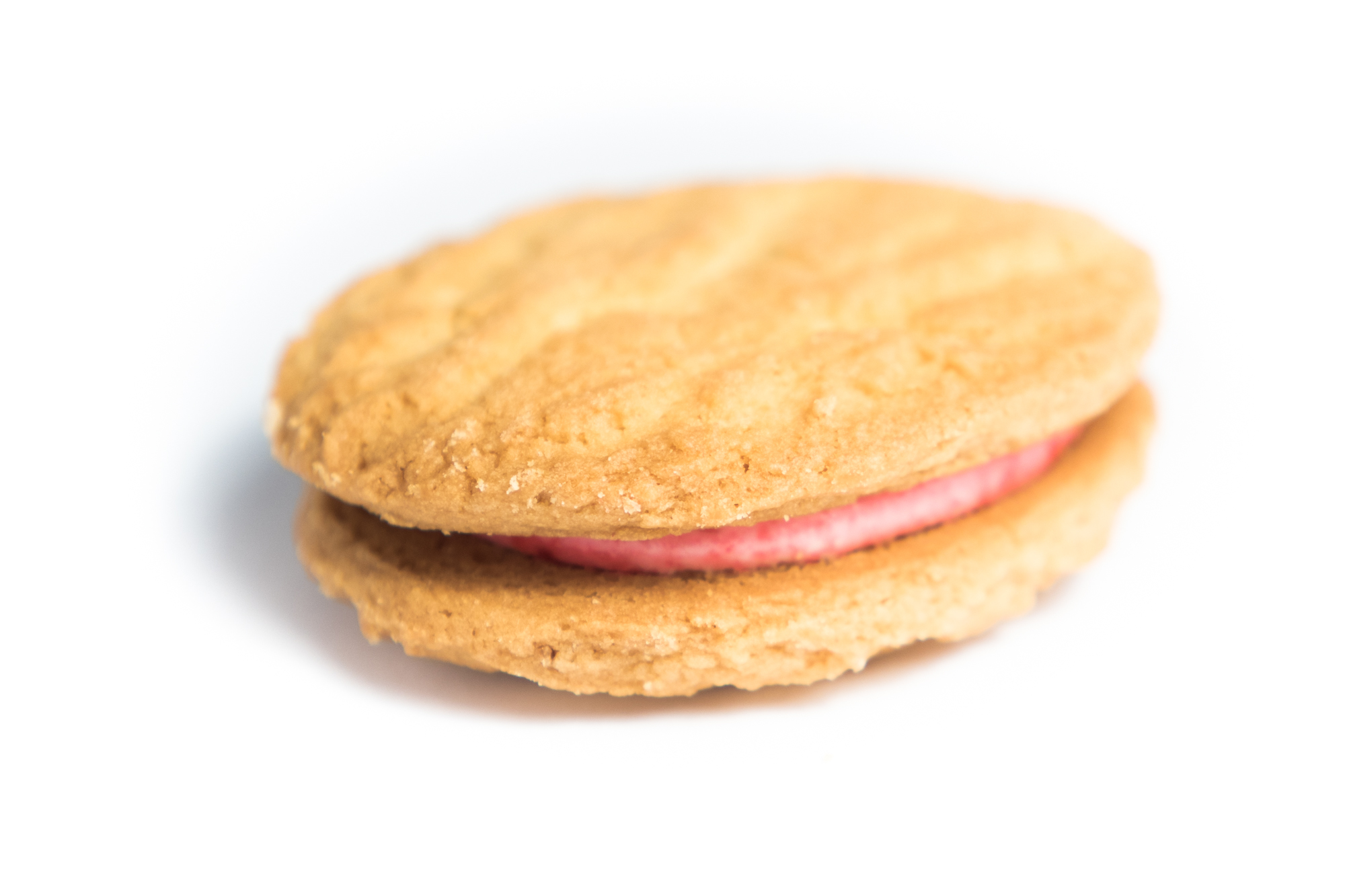
Intact Monte Carlo biscuit

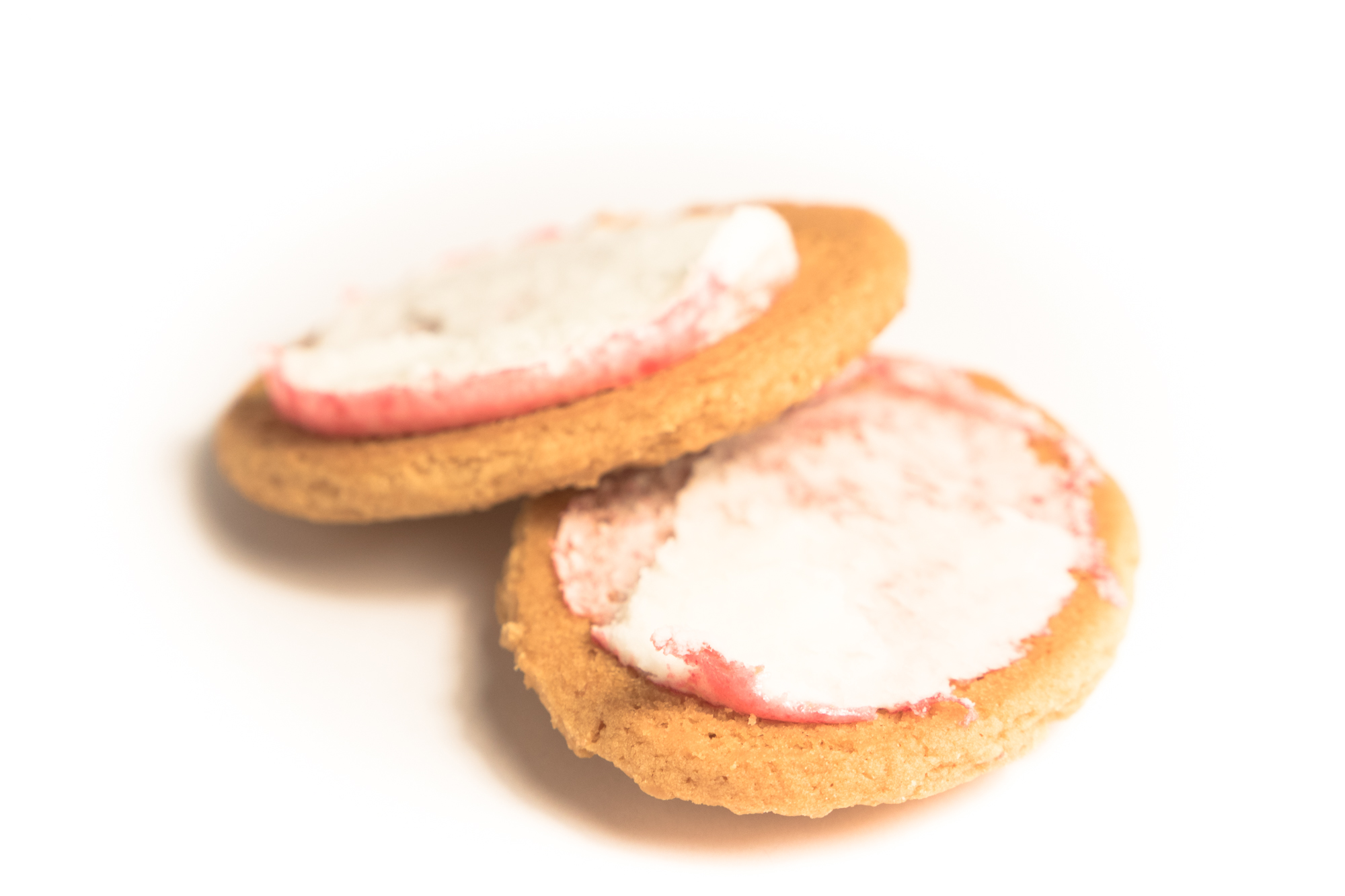
Split open Monte Carlo biscuit, showing filling

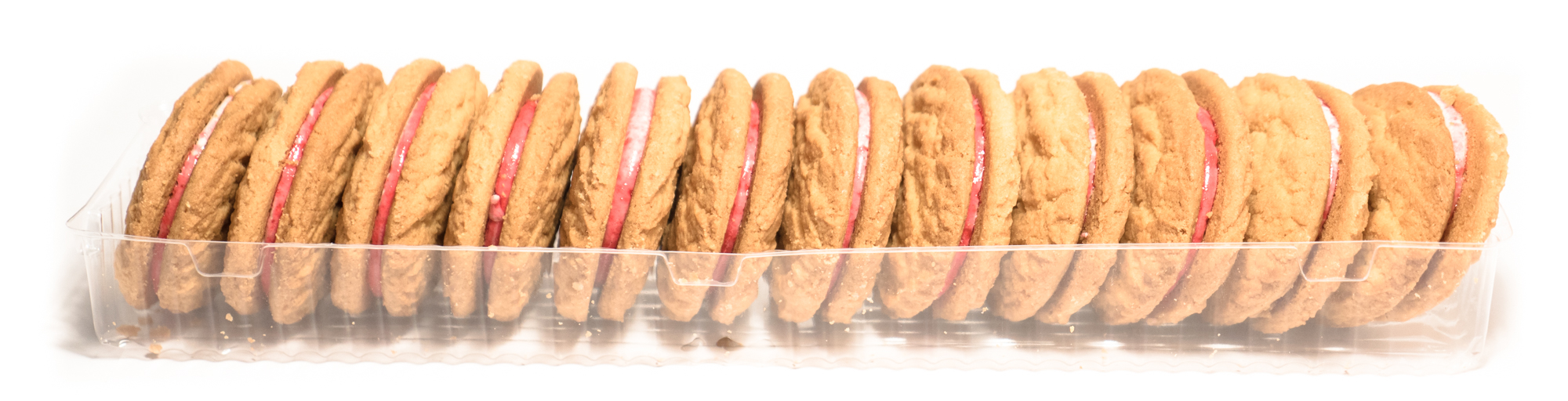
Twelve Monte Carlo biscuits in internal commercial packaging

Monte Carlo biscuits are an Australian sweet biscuit that have been manufactured since 1926 by Arnott's Biscuits Holdings.

Each biscuit comprises two biscuit layers sandwiching a creamy filling. While many such biscuits are moulded to a design, both sides of the Monte Carlo biscuit are rough. The biscuit layers have a mild taste of golden syrup, honey and coconut, and the cream layer consists of a vanilla-flavoured cream filling surrounded by a thin toffee-like coating of raspberry jam.

The Monte Carlo biscuit is available in most Australian and New Zealand supermarkets, being typically sold in 250 g (8.8 oz) packages of 12 individual biscuits and as one of the five biscuits in the Arnott's Assorted Creams 500 g (18 oz) variety pack. With an average mass of 20.8 grams (0.73 oz), the Monte Carlo is the heaviest biscuit available in the Assorted Creams pack.

The biscuits were named after the city of Monte Carlo. They are a recurring motif in Leanne Moriarty's 2024 novel "Here One Moment" and are a reference to the book's broad theme of prediction, chance, and the Monte Carlo Fallacy (aka the Gambler's Fallacy).
