= SAO (biscuit) =

Australian cracker biscuit

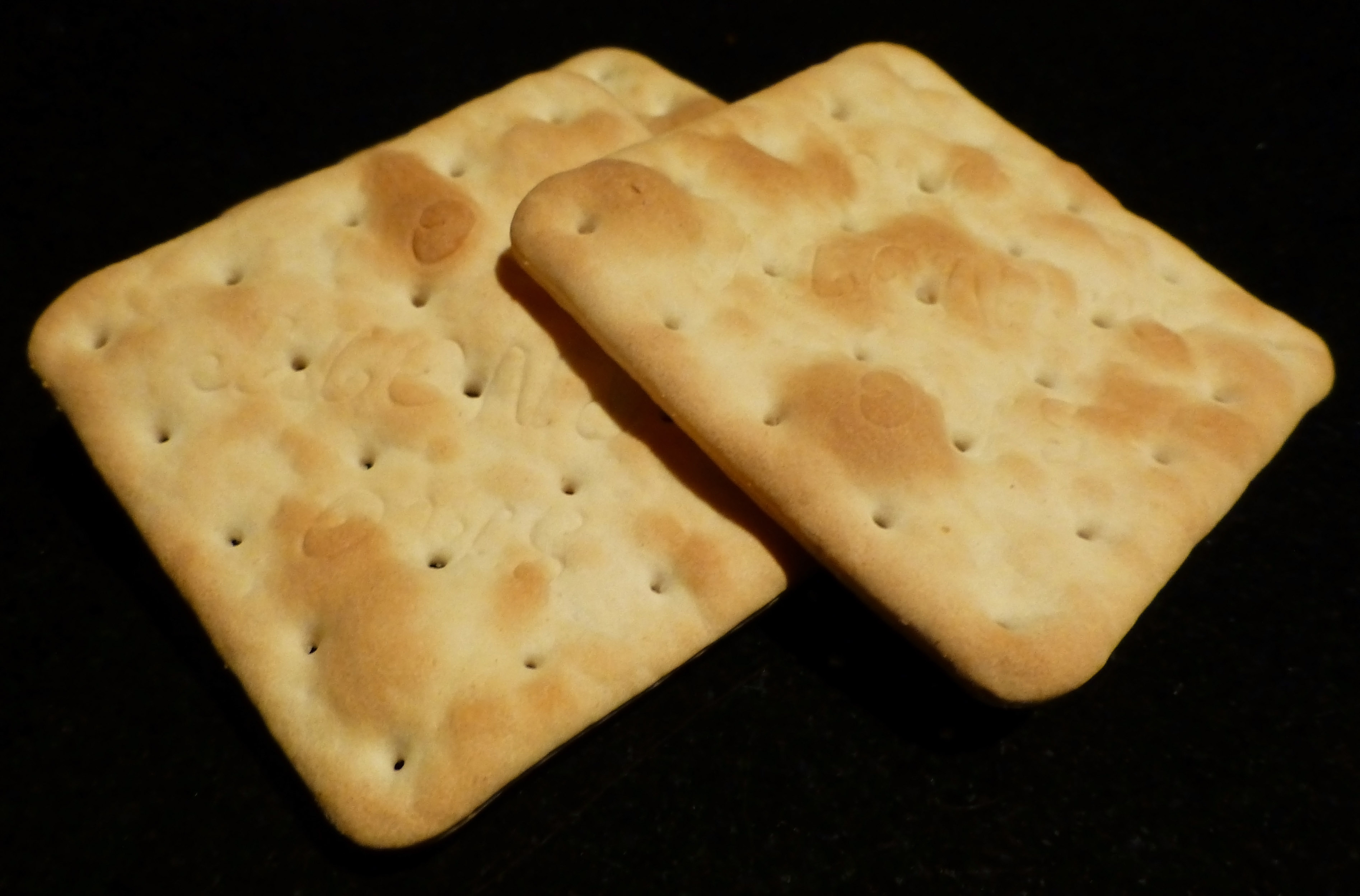
- Three SAO crackers
- Product type: Snack food
- Current owner: Arnott's Biscuits Holdings
- Country: Australia
- Introduced: 1904

SAO biscuits are a savoury cracker biscuit that was launched in Australia in 1904 by Arnott's, the term SAO being trade marked in 1904.

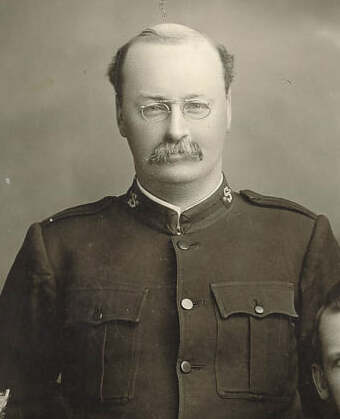
Arthur Arnott, for whom the biscuits may have been named.

The origin of the name "SAO" is unknown. A widely held belief is that the name is an acronym for "Salvation Army Officer", and was named for Arthur, one of the Arnott brothers, who was indeed an officer in the Salvation Army. The Salvation Army Australia somewhat cautiously mentions this on its website, calling it "Arguably Fact" and saying "...it is understood they named it in honour of their brother Arthur Arnott, a Salvation Army Officer. In the 1993 book The Story of Arnott's Famous Biscuits, Ross Arnott states that Sao was the name of a sailing boat (Note: Perhaps Dr Milford's 6-ton yacht Sao built by W. M. Ford and launched 15 December 1883. She took part in a famous race with Iolanthe and Assegai in 1887. A few owners later, she was still competitive in 1897.) which his grandfather (Arnott's founder William Arnott) saw on Lake Macquarie, of which he said "That would make a good name for a biscuit."

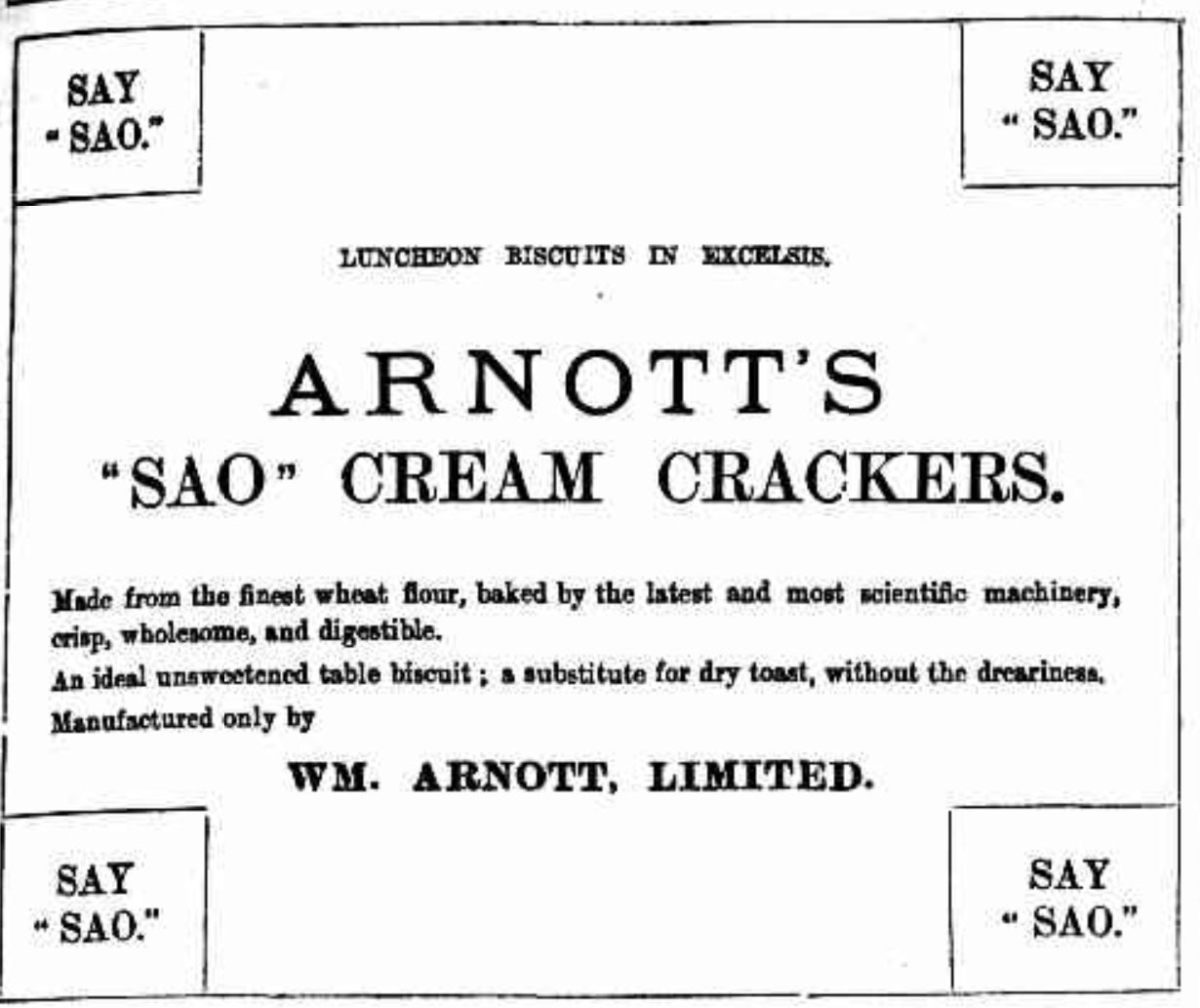
1905 advertisement for SAO biscuits in the Sydney Morning Herald

SAOs are often eaten as a light snack, topped with butter and Vegemite, or other ingredients. They were also a common base for home-made vanilla slice in Australian homes.
