= Tiny Teddy =

Brand of sweet biscuits

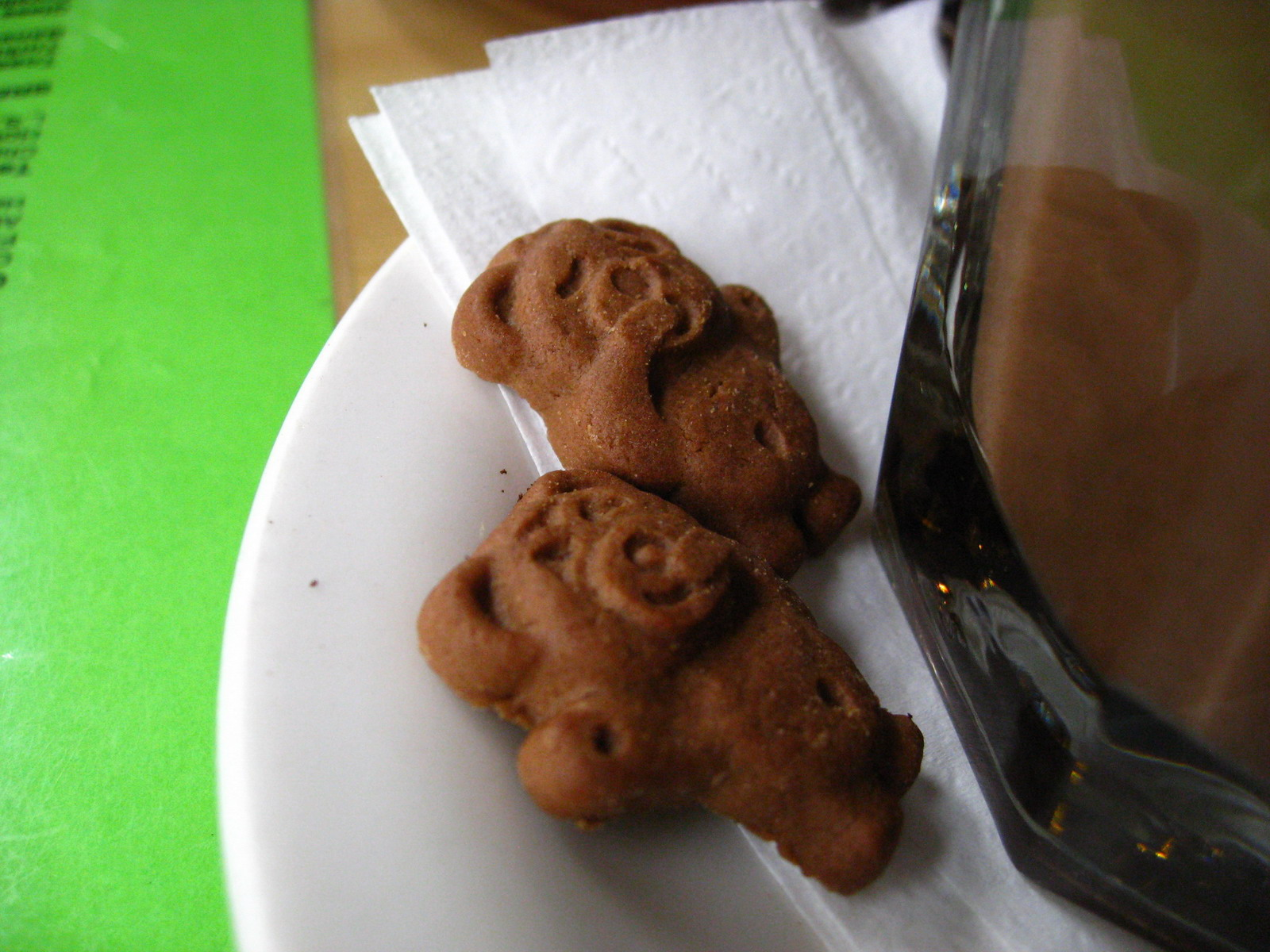
Chocolate Tiny Teddy biscuits

Tiny Teddy is a brand of sweet biscuits manufactured by Arnott's in Australia, since 1991.

Each biscuit is small and teddy bear-shaped, and variations in facial expression have been given the names Happy, Sleepy, Grumpy, Cheeky, Silly and Hungry. They are similar in appearance to the North American Teddy Grahams.

Tiny Teddy biscuits are available in five flavours:

- Chocolate chip
- Chocolate
- Honey
- Hundreds and thousands
- Chocolate half coat
- Gluten Free Choc Chip

Tiny Teddy is also available as a cereal named "Teeny Tiny Teddy" with the choice of either chocolate flavoured or honey flavoured "bear-shaped" cereal.

In 2004, Arnott's released a range of savoury Tiny Teddy biscuits, but these weren't successful and were shortly discontinued.

In 2006, Arnott's authorised the release of four story books, aimed at pre-school aged children, published as the Arnott's Tiny Teddy Adventure Stories.

In February 2023, Arnott's released a Tiny Teddy's Breakfast Cereal in "Choc Cereal" and "Honey Cereal" flavours.

In Indonesia, Tiny Teddy are sold as Nyam-Nyam Teddy or Good Time Teddy.

== See also ==
- Hello Panda
- Koala's March
- Teddy Grahams
