= Koala's March =

Japanese cookie snack

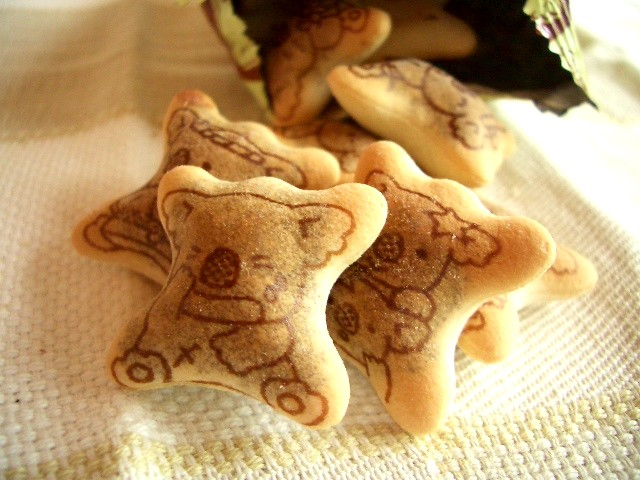
- Alternative names: Koala Yummies
- Course: Snack
- Place of origin: Japan
- Created by: Lotte

Koala's March (Japanese: コアラのマーチ, romanized: Koara no Māchi) is a Japanese brand of a bite-sized cookie snack with a sweet filling. The cookies are produced by Lotte.

== History ==
The product was first released in Japan in 1984, to celebrate the arrival of the first koalas to the country. The snack originally only came with a chocolate filling. The product expanded to Hong Kong in 1986.

In 1988, some Japanese students started the rumor that finding a cookie with a koala with two eyebrows playing a trumpet would bring good luck on exams. This myth has persisted until at least 2019.

The product was released in Australia by 1990, and in the United States in May 1990. Originally, the snacks used the name "Koala Yummies" in the United States, later changing to the name "Koala's March," a translation of the Japanese name. In the United States, the cookies are primarily found in Asian specialty stores and some Hispanic specialty stores.

Koala's March was one of the products impacted by the 2008 Chinese milk scandal.

In 2012, Lotte released an 'emergency food' version of Koala's March biscuits without filling, which were sold in cans and had a shelf life of five years.

== Description ==
Koala's March is in the shape of a koala, with printing on the outside of the cookie showing the koala doing some sort of activity, such as playing drums, holding a picture, posing, playing a trumpet, or crying from appendicitis. More than 600 official designs exist, but only 365 are being actively manufactured as of 2023. New designs are introduced to reflect new technology or cultural trends, and designs are retired if they become outdated (such as a koala using a pager). The filling comes in various sweet flavors, such as apple pie, banana, cheesecake, chocolate (with bitter chocolate and white chocolate variants), cocoa and milk, cotton candy, honey, latte (with almond and caramel variants), lemon tart, matcha, pineapple, strawberry, and vanilla.

Koala's March has also produced variants in collaboration with other brands, such as Pokémon (2020), Franck Muller (2023), Attack on Titan (2023), Hello Kitty, and Madoka Magica.

Koala's March supports the Australian conservation group Australian Koala Foundation.

They also have cards, naming the different types of "koalas".

== See also ==
- Chocolate in Japan
- Hello Panda
- Teddy Grahams
- Tiny Teddy
