= Menz Confectionery =

Confectionery manufacturer in Adelaide, South Australia

Menz Confectionery is a manufacturer of confectionery in Adelaide, South Australia. It has its origins in two companies, W. Menz & Co., a biscuit and confectionery business, and Robern, called Robern Menz from 1992 to January 2022.

== History of W. Menz & Co. ==
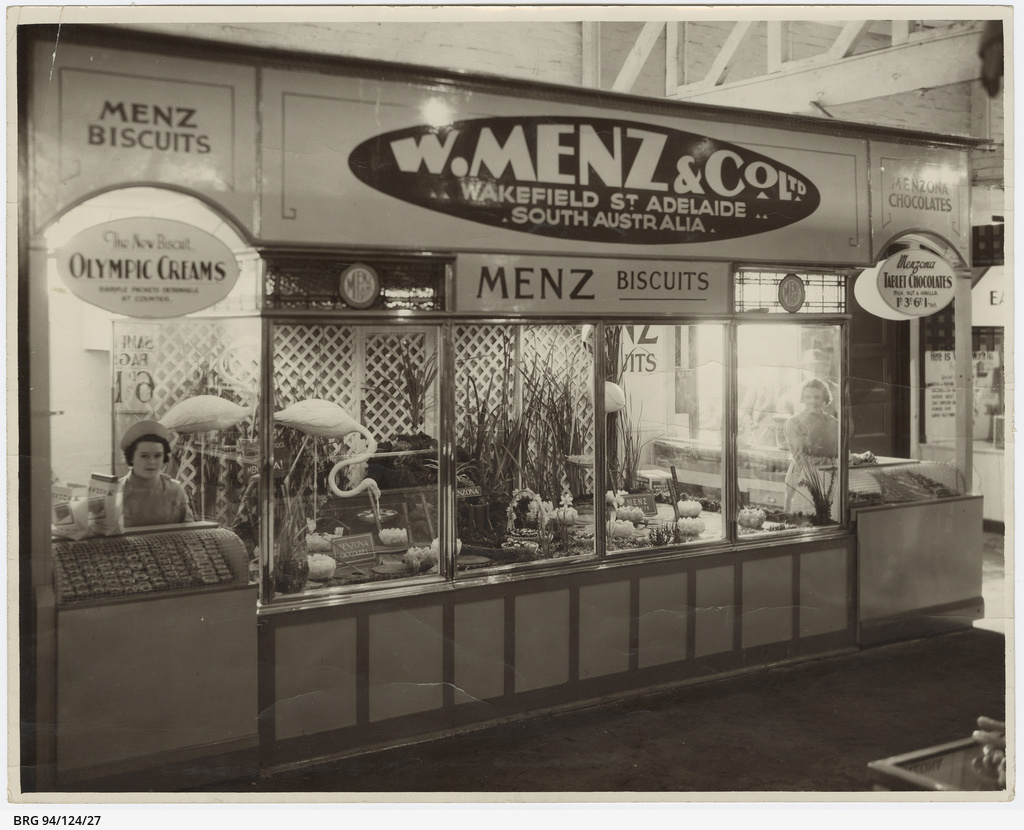
W. Menz & Company biscuit company, Wakefield Street, Adelaide.

William Menz (10 November 1849 – 26 March 1898) was born in Wakefield Street, Adelaide, the son of Johan (16 December 1818 – 10 April 1860) and Magdalena (1 January 1819 – 12 October 1895) Menz, and was educated at the German School conducted by Adolph Heinrich Leschen and Theodor H. Niehuus (also on Wakefield Street), then at W. A. Cawthorne's Victoria Square Academy.

William began working for grocers G. Wood, Son & Co., then around 1865 took over the grocery business in Wakefield Street which had been established by his mother Magdalena Menz in 1850. The business prospered, and in 1878 his brother August Hermann Menz (12 March 1855 – 3 December 1922) joined the firm.

On the death of William, August Hermann took over the firm until 1919, when a limited liability company was formed, with him as managing director. He married Wilhelmine H. A "Minna" Menz (15 November 1865 – 18 June 1951) on 9 May 1889; they had two sons, Hermann Victor (1890–1984) and William Oscar (1896–1991), and a daughter, Anna Magdalena (1891–1955) and lived at Beulah Road, Norwood.

Hermann Victor Menz became managing director in 1922. He was captain of the Adelaide Rowing Club.

The Menz bakery developed the Yo-Yo s, now manufactured by Arnott's, and started producing Crown Mints in 1892.

=== Timeline ===
- 1850: Magdalena Menz's grocery store opened on Wakefield Street
- November 1878: New premises and dwelling erected at corner of Divett St. and Wakefield Street
- 1880 or 1884: Menz began making biscuits
- 1892 began making confectionery
- July 1895: Fire (directly opposite the Fire Brigade headquarters)
- 1906: Albany Murray, son of Alex Murray jun., started running the biscuit-making factory.
- September 1913: New building completed on the original site
- June 1920: Building extended to Roper Street.
- 1951: W. Menz & Co. floated as public company
- December 1953: New biscuit plant opened at Galway Avenue, Richmond
- 1964: Menz joined with Motteram and Arnott's Biscuits to form Arnott-Motteram-Menz; later simply Arnott's.
- 1992: US company Campbell's took over Arnott's Biscuits, with the confectionery part being sold to Robern.

== Menz Confectionery ==
Menz Confectionery, formerly Robern Menz, is a confectioner in Glynde in the eastern suburbs of Adelaide, South Australia, best known for its FruChocs.

The business was started in 1926 by Walter Sims in the Riverland, initially manufacturing dried fruit. He created the name "Robern" to remember a family friend, Robert Burnley, who had died at the age of 14. Robern Menz produced its first FruChocs, chocolate-covered fruit balls, in 1948.

W. Menz was sold to Arnott's Biscuits in 1964, and in 1992, when Campbell's acquired the biscuit business, Robern bought the confectionery part, renaming it Robern Menz.

In 1995, Robern Menz moved from the inner-eastern Adelaide suburb of Stepney to take up occupancy of the former Gibb's Pies factory on Glynburn Road, Glynde, where it remains as of 2022.

In January 2018, Robern Menz bought the brand, recipe and manufacturing equipment for Violet Crumble from Nestlé. The equipment was moved from the Nestlé factory at Campbellfield in Melbourne to the Robern Menz factory at Glynde, ready to start production in September of that year.

In 2019, Robern Menz signed another deal with Nestlé, this time to produce the Polly Waffle, which had been discontinued in 2009. The Polly Waffle is scheduled for production in 2023.

In January 2022, the company was rebranded as Menz Confectionery, adopting a new logo with the slogan "Making life sweet" at the same time. As of January 2022, CEO Phil Sims and his brother Richard are the fourth generation to run the Robern business, which employs around 160 staff.
