= FruChocs =

Australian confectionery

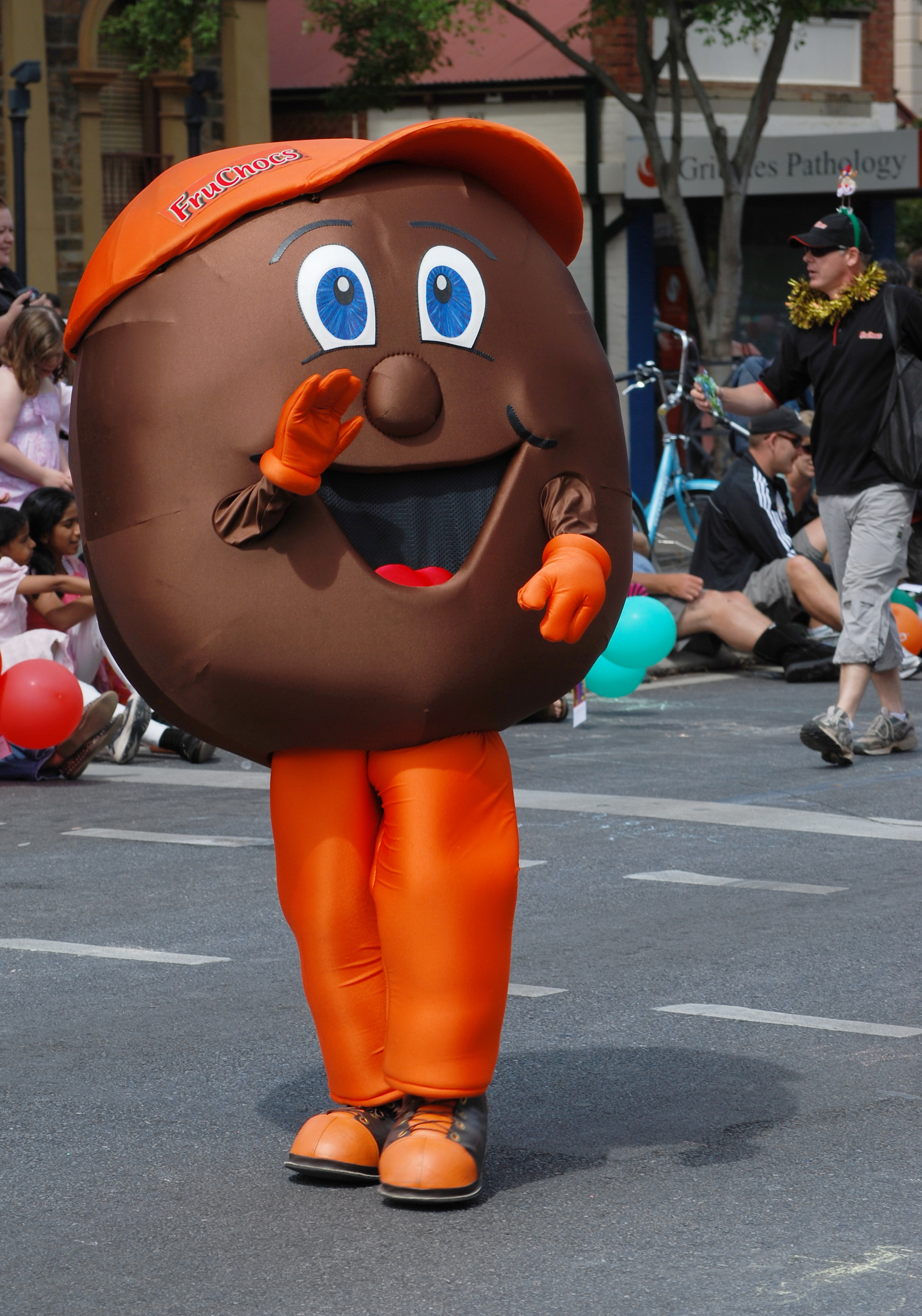
- A FruChoc mascot costume in a parade
- Product type: confectionery
- Current owner: Robern Menz
- Country: Australia
- Introduced: 1948
- Previous owners: Menz

FruChocs are a confectionery produced by Menz Confectionery in South Australia. FruChocs consist of a cube of dried apricot and peach paste, coated in milk chocolate. Since 2019, strawberry and cherry filled FruChocs have also become available. FruChocs have been produced in South Australia since 1948. They were originally introduced to make use of excess fruit from the Riverland and Barossa Valley. Certain varieties of FruChocs are also coated in dark or white chocolate.

FruChocs were declared to be a South Australian icon in 2005.
