= Hello Panda =

Japanese biscuit snack

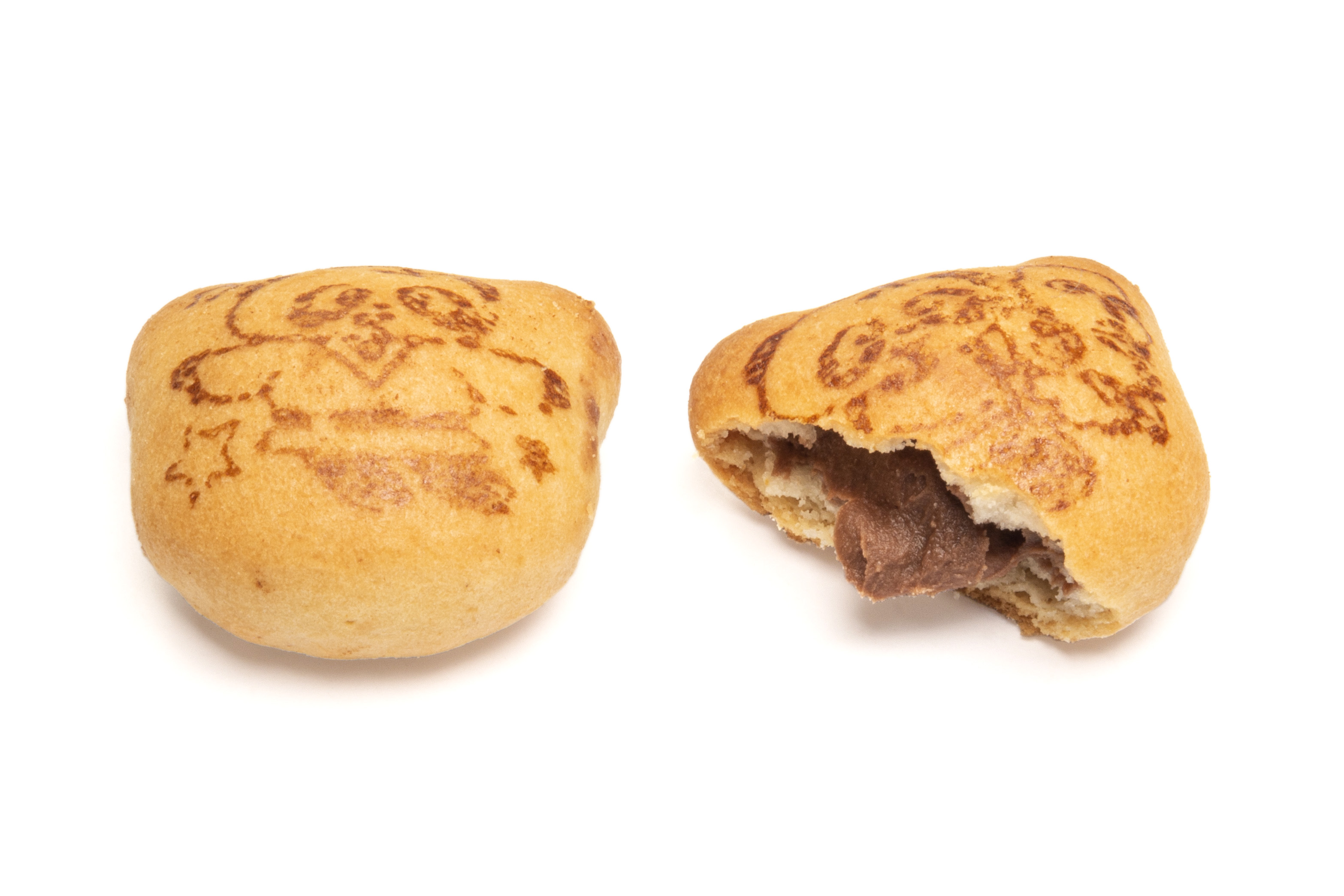
- Chocolate Hello Panda
- Type: Biscuit
- Course: Dessert
- Place of origin: Japan
- Invented: 1987
- Serving temperature: Room temperature
- Food energy (per 10 pieces (30g) serving): 160 kcal (670 kJ)
Nutritional value
(per 10 pieces (30g) serving)
- Protein: 2 g
- Fat: 10 g
- Carbohydrate: 18 g

Hello Panda is a brand of Japanese biscuit, manufactured by Meiji Seika. It was first released in Japan during 1987 under the name Konnichiwa Panda (こんにちはパンダ). It was discontinued in Japan in 1989 due to difficult competition, but remains sold internationally, such as China, Australia and Kuwait. Each biscuit consists of a small hollow shortbread layer, filled with crème of various flavors. On some biscuits there are printed cartoon style depictions of giant pandas doing various activities, such as fencing or archery. In the United States, the biscuits show the pandas doing other activities such as basketball, hockey and baseball.

Hello Panda was originally baked in Japan by Meiji Seika, but was first produced internationally in Singapore in 1991. The biscuits are exported to most developed countries, such as the United Kingdom (by Unisnacks), most European countries, the United States, the Middle East, Australia and Canada. Certain varieties of the biscuit are found only in certain countries. For example, the chocolate pretzel variety is produced by Meiji America, Meiji's North American division, and are thus sold in North America.

A box of strawberry Hello Panda

The biscuits are commonly sold in a tall, hexagonal box with 2 oz or 57.5 g. In some countries, Hello Panda biscuits are available in small 21 and 35 g aluminium pouches, 50 g as well as 260 g boxes and limited edition packages. While the boxes come in sizes of 60 g (20 cookies), 170 g (hexagonal boxes containing eight bags weighing 21 g) and 680 g (a box containing 32 bags weighing 21 g) packets can also be bought containing a mixture of flavors.

== Flavors ==
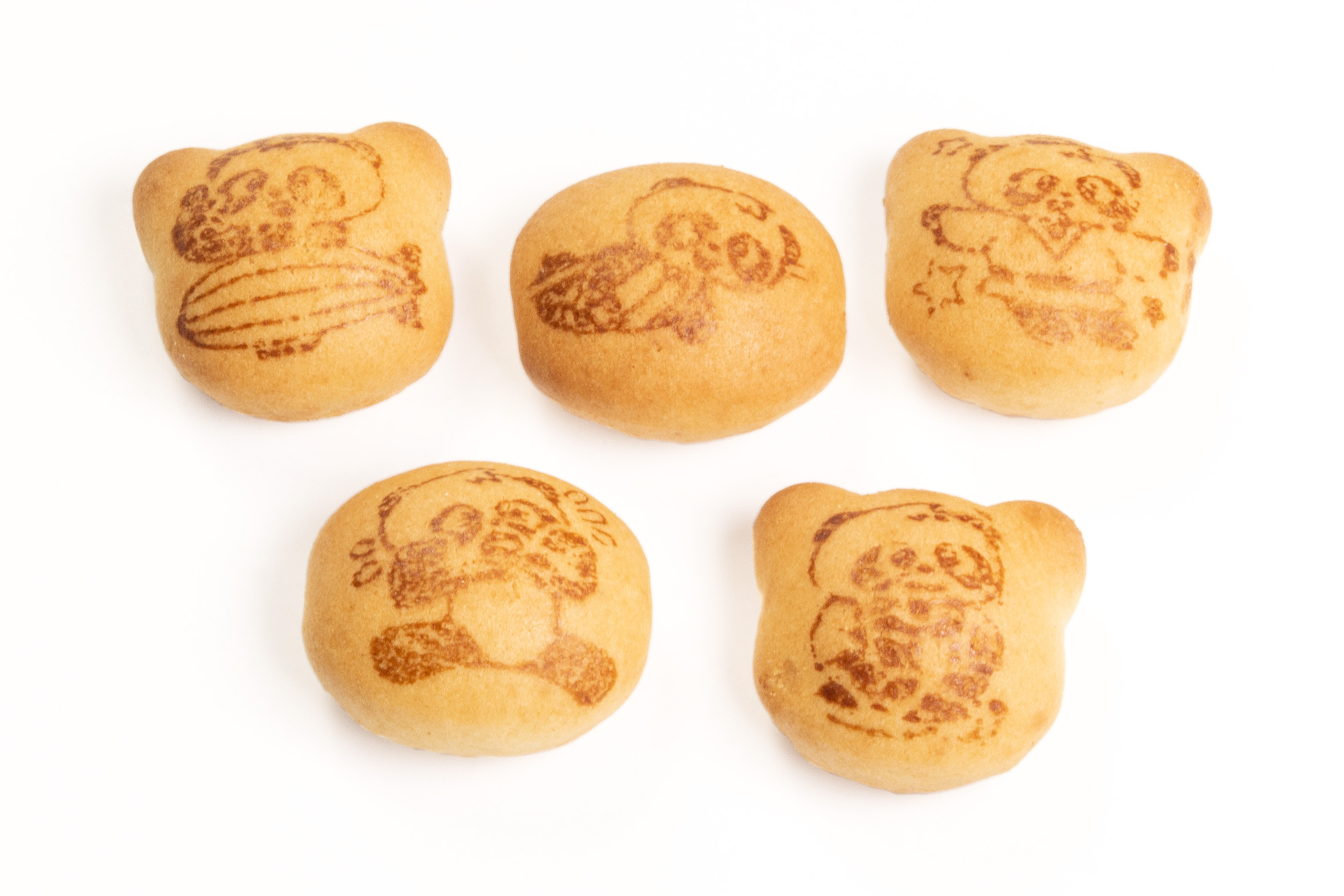
Hello Panda biscuits are decorated with illustrations of pandas doing various activities.

- Chocolate
- Strawberry
- Vanilla
- Matcha green tea
- Double chocolate
- Milk
- Milk + Chocolate Biscuit
- Coconut
- Caramel – First introduced in the US in 2020
- Pretzel Chocolate

== See also ==
- List of shortbread biscuits and cookies
- Koala's March
- Teddy Grahams
- Tiny Teddy
