= Teddy Grahams =

Snack brand owned by Mondelez

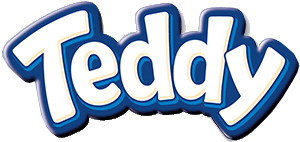

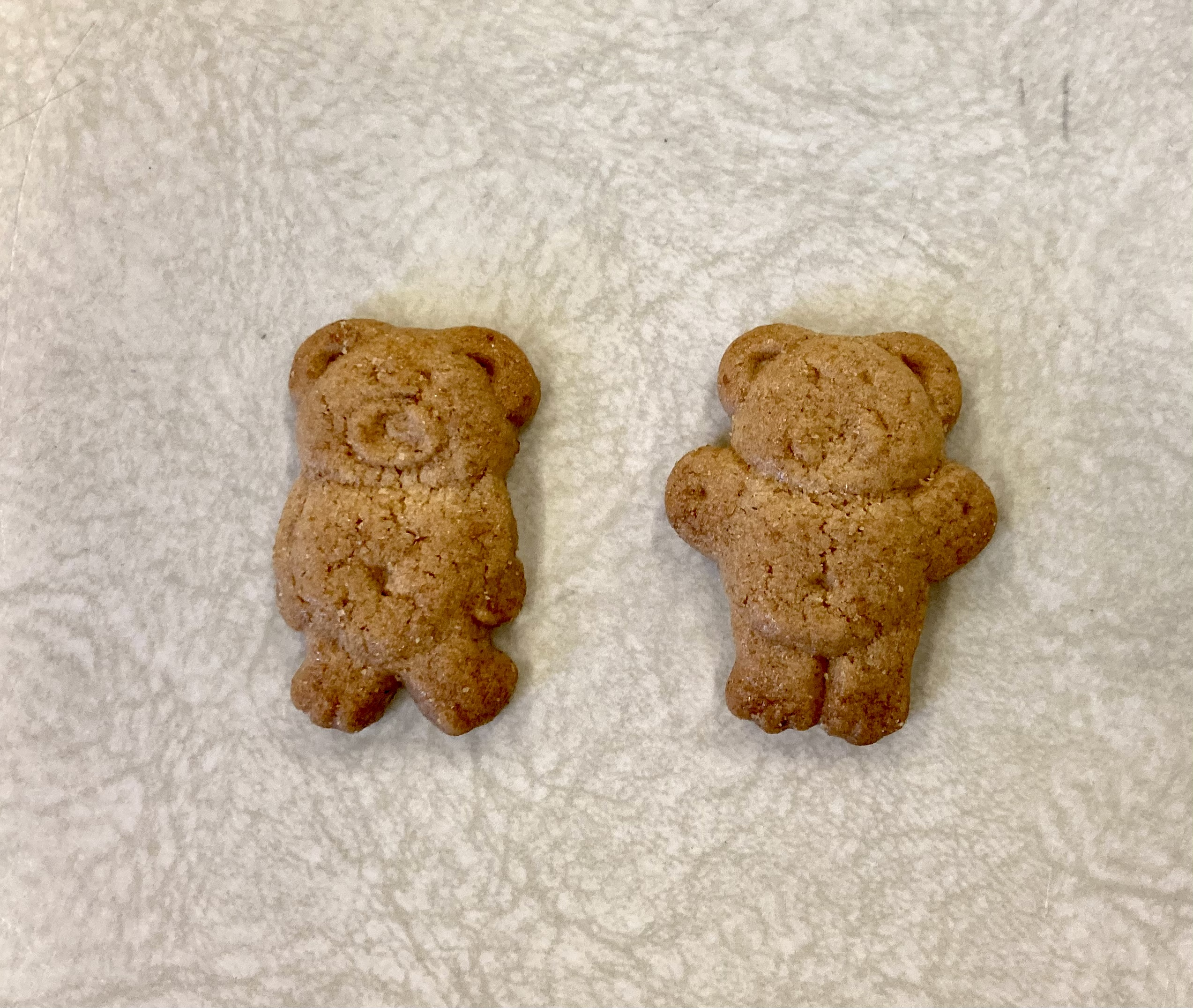
- Two Teddy Grahams in different poses
- Product type: Graham cookie
- Current owner: Mondelez International
- Country: United States
- Introduced: 1988; 38 years ago
- Previous owners: Nabisco

Teddy Grahams are bear-shaped graham cracker snacks created by Nabisco. Introduced in 1988, Teddy Grahams come in two distinct shapes: bears with arms up and legs closed, and bears with legs open and arms down. When introduced, Teddy Grahams were available in honey, cinnamon, and chocolate flavors. Since then, they have added chocolate chip as one of the main varieties, with strawberry joining the lineup in 2025. Previously they have also offered vanilla, banana, birthday cake, mixed berry, strawberry banana, and apple flavors but they have since been discontinued.

Nabisco has also put out various other products under the Teddy Grahams brand, including various Disney character shaped grahams.

== Nutrition ==
In a 1992 New York Times article, Eating Well, Marian Burros pointed out that Teddy Grahams use more bleached flour than actual whole wheat graham flour. Nabisco later increased the amount of whole grain flour used in the snack.

== History ==
Teddy Grahams sold more than $150 million worth of products in its first year. It was the biggest new product success in the industry in more than 25 years. It became the third best selling cookie from Nabisco, after Chips Ahoy! and Oreo.

=== Discontinued products ===
Dizzy Grizzlies were a variant of Teddy Grahams, and were so called because they would "become dizzy" due to the snacker looking at each side again and again, as the backside is covered with chocolate and sprinkles. These were also themed in extreme sports such as in-line skating.

A line of cereal known as Teddy Grahams Breakfast Bears was introduced around 1990. It featured chocolate, cinnamon, and honey flavor varieties, however this cereal got bad reviews because it got too soggy in milk and it was discontinued shortly afterwards.

Teddy Soft Bakes were baked treats with either a vanilla or chocolate filling. They were discontinued around 2019.

=== Mascot change ===
The original mascot was a light brown bear that had no clothes. Later, Nabisco changed the mascot and added a shirt depending on what flavor of the teddy grahams it was representing. In 2017, they changed the mascot again to a brown bear with a blue and white striped shirt. Around January 2023, the mascot was changed again to a mascot that resembles the snack cookies themselves.

== See also ==
- Hello Panda
- Koala's March
- Tiny Teddy
- Gummy bear
