= Tim Tam =

Australian brand of chocolate biscuit

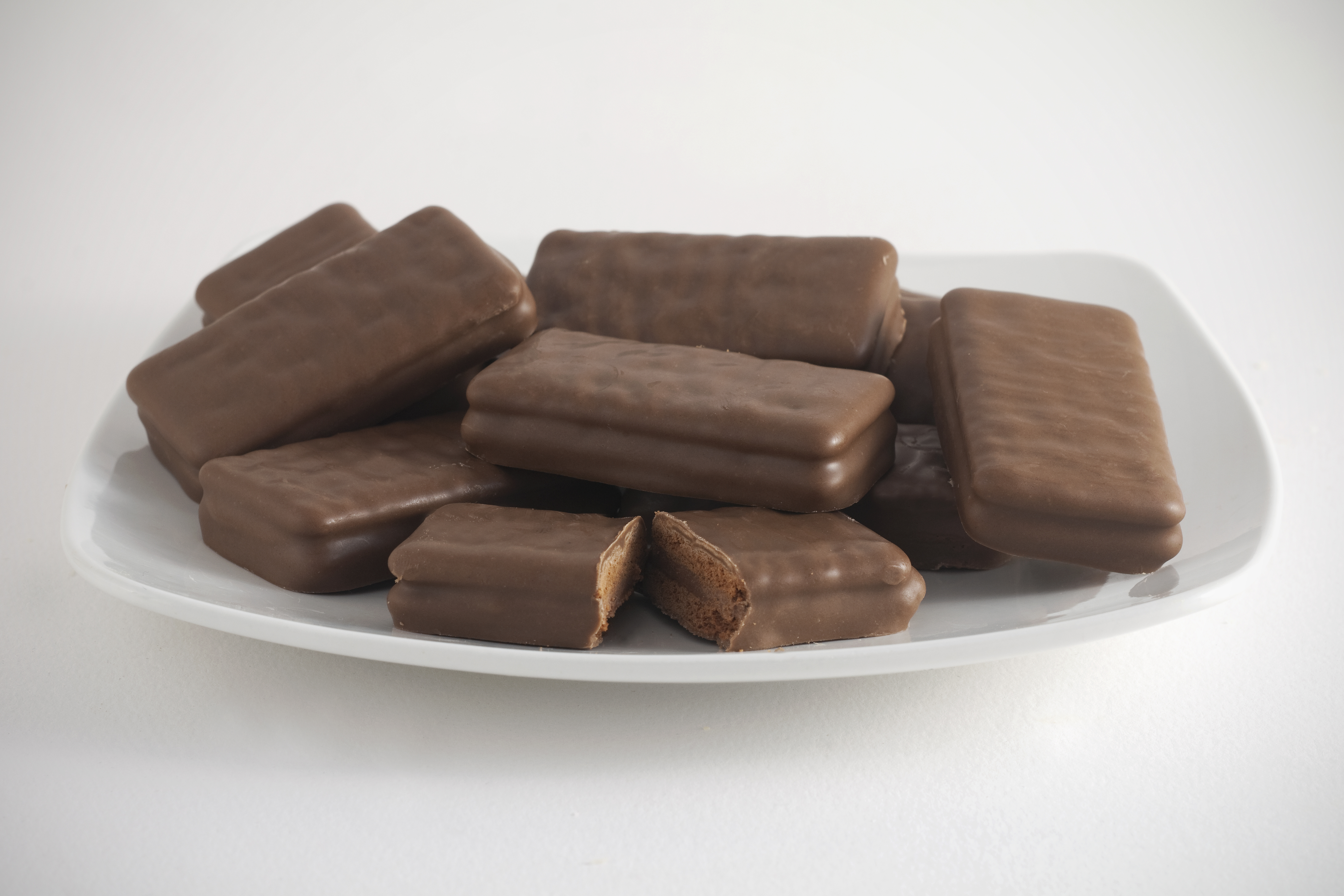
- A plate of Tim Tams
- Product type: Snack food
- Current owner: Arnott's Biscuits Holdings
- Country: Australia
- Introduced: 1964; 62 years ago
- Website: arnotts.com/brands/tim-tam

Tim Tam is a brand of chocolate biscuit introduced by the Australian biscuit company Arnott's Biscuits Holdings in 1964. It consists of two malted biscuits separated by a light hard chocolate cream filling and coated in a thin layer of textured chocolate.

== History ==
The biscuit was created by Ian Norris. During 1958 he took a world trip looking for inspiration for new products. While visiting Britain, he found the Penguin biscuit and decided to try to "make a better one".

Tim Tam went on the market on 10 September 1964. They were named by Ross Arnott, who attended the 1958 Kentucky Derby and decided that the name of the winning horse, Tim Tam, was perfect for a planned new line of biscuits. Pepperidge Farm, a sister company of Arnott's, began importing the Tim Tam to the United States in 2008. Tim Tams are still "Made in Australia" and packaging in the US bears the slogan "Australia's Favorite Cookie".

In July 2021, the biscuit got a 0.5 Health Star Rating, attracting media attention.

== Production ==
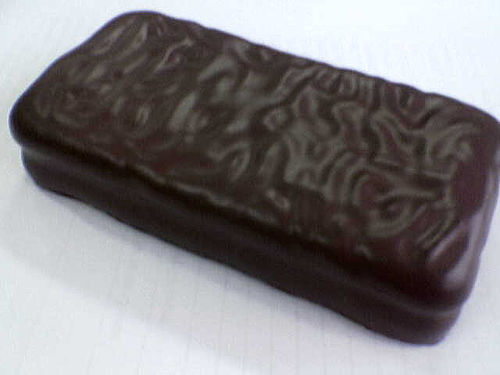
A dark chocolate Tim Tam

The original Arnott's bakery, opened in 1865, was located in Newcastle, New South Wales. To date, manufacture of Tim Tams and other Arnott's products has remained largely within Australia, including bakeries in Sydney, Adelaide, and Brisbane. In 2009, Arnott's invested A$37 million in a state-of-the-art production line at its Brisbane facility, expecting to boost productivity and increase jobs.

At the Huntingwood bakery in Western Sydney, the production line turns out about 3,000 Tim Tams per minute and uses 20 tonnes of the biscuit's cream filling and 27 tons of chocolate coating each work day. Biscuit dough, containing sugar, flour, colours and flavours, is mixed for 20 minutes. Biscuits are then cut to 1 mm thick, 11 holes are punched per biscuit and they are baked in gas ovens for 90 minutes. Freezing air cools the biscuits before they are flipped and filled with cream, dunked in chocolate and cooled again.

== Varieties ==
Two flavours for the South East Asian market, choco chocolate and choco cappuccino, sold in Indonesia until the brand's departure from the country in 2023.

Since the 1980s, Arnott's has released many different varieties of the product, some as limited-edition runs. Varieties include double coat, dark chocolate, white chocolate, caramel, dark chocolate mint, honeycomb and choc orange.

In 2004, Arnott's caused a controversy when they released limited edition Tim Tam Tia Maria and Kahlua Mint Slice varieties, flavoured with the popular alcoholic liqueurs. The Australian Drug Foundation suggested selling the biscuits in supermarkets was "potentially dangerous" by "normalising" the taste of alcohol for children. An Arnott's spokesperson observed that a customer "would need to consume [their] body weight of biscuits every hour to reach a blood-alcohol content of .05".

In 2011, a cheese flavoured variety of Tim Tam was developed for the Indonesian market, where they are manufactured by Halo Arnotts.

In February 2014, Arnott's launched a limited edition range of three new Tim Tam flavours created by Australian dessert chef Adriano Zumbo: salted caramel, choc brownie and raspberry white choc. Point of sale displays featured Zumbo pink in contrast to traditional chocolate brown Tim Tam brand colours. Red Velvet was the fourth Zumbo Tim Tam creation, launched in July 2014. Also in July 2014, Arnott's launched peanut butter-flavoured Tim Tams. Arnott's was awarded a CHOICE "Shonky Award" for the offering, which did not contain peanuts (paprika was used as a flavour substitute) and included two fewer biscuits than the original variety Tim Tam packet.

During the Valentine's Day period of 2015, Arnott's launched Choc Raspberry and Coconut Cream flavours, again collaborating with Zumbo. In October 2015, Arnott's launched Tim Tam Choc Banana. A limited edition "mocktail" Tim Tam range was launched in February 2016 with piña colada, espresso martini and strawberry champagne variants. Arnott's told media in May 2016 that sales of the Tim Tam mocktail range had not met their expectations.

Arnott's introduced toffee apple and pineapple flavours to the market in June 2016. In October 2016 they added a mango variety to the range, and in February 2017 they launched four new flavours—including chocolate mint, salted caramel and vanilla, coconut and lychee, and black forest—in partnership with Gelato Messina.

In April 2024, Arnott's released a Tim Tam flavour inspired by Jatz crackers. The collaboration was originally the subject of an April Fools' Day joke by the company in 2023.

In the United States, the original, dark chocolate, and caramel varieties are available for sale. In 2017, an additional flavour, dark chocolate-mint, was produced for the American market.

== Marketing ==
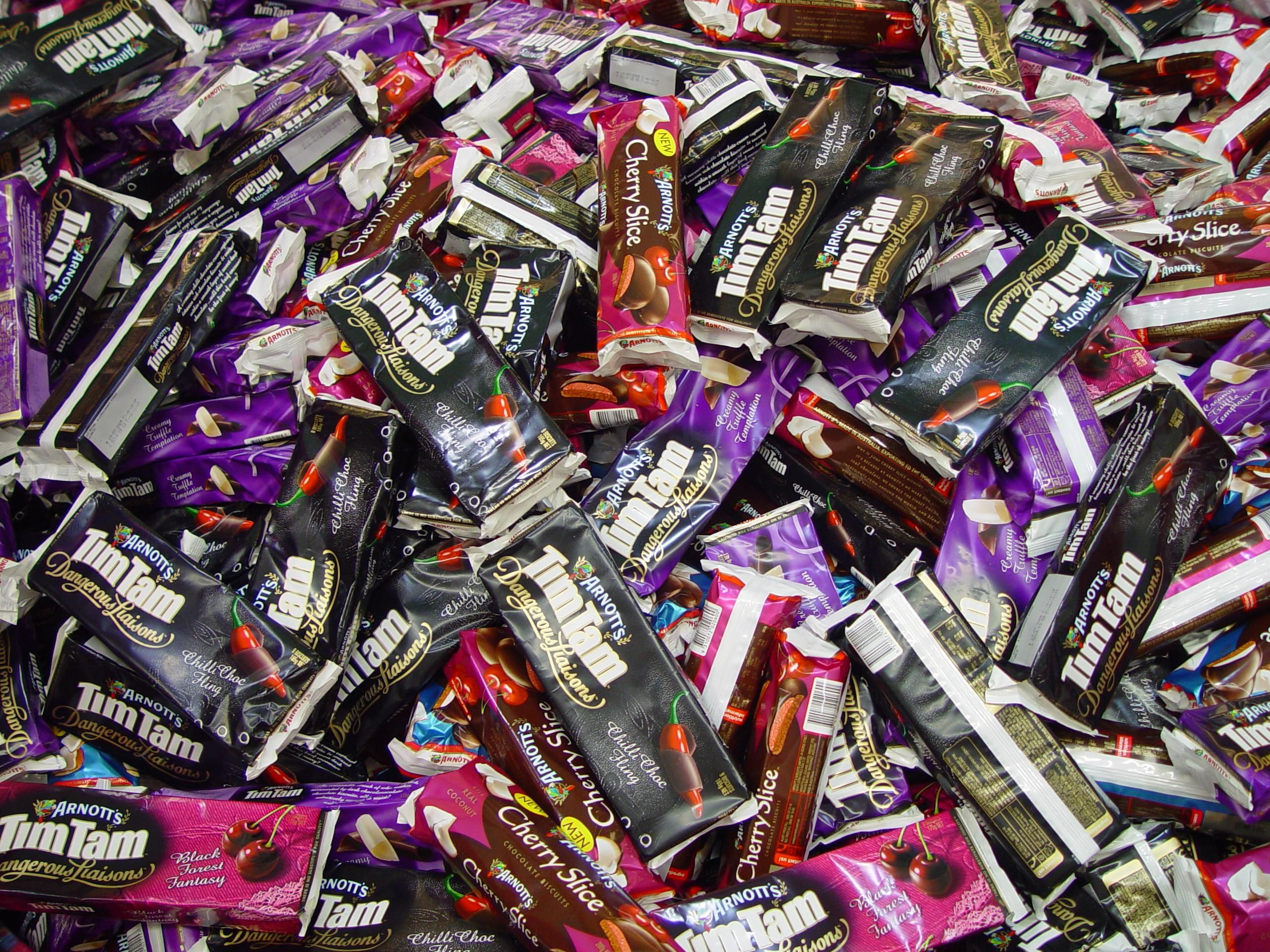
Tim Tam: Dangerous Liaisons: Chilli Choc Fling and Black Forest Fantasy

In 1994, Arnott's cast a pre-fame Cate Blanchett in a television commercial as a woman who asks for "a packet of Tim Tams that never runs out" from a wish-granting genie. Arnott's has sporadically continued to use the genie concept in subsequent ad campaigns; in a 2001 commercial the genie was played by hip-hop artist N'fa, while a 2021 campaign cast actor and former The Bachelor Australia star Tim Robards as the "Tim Tam Genie". A female genie has also appeared in some campaigns.

In October 2006, Arnott's partnered with the National Breast Cancer Foundation to launch a limited-edition pink Tim Tam to coincide with that year's pink ribbon campaign.

Responding to a fan's Facebook post wishing that Tim Tams grew on trees, in 2012 Arnott's "planted" a Tim Tam orchard in Martin Place on 2 May 2012. The campaign generated more than 475,000 views on Tim Tam's YouTube channel and the brand experienced a 23% baseline sales uplift over the campaign period.

In late 2015, media reported that Coles was attempting to resist price rises to Tim Tam and other Arnott's products. When Coles refused the cost increase, Arnott's refused to supply the chain for two weeks.

In 2016, to advertise Tim Tam mocktail flavours, Arnott's recruited Sophie Monk to feature in television advertisements as the face of the range.

In 2022, Tim Tams were featured in the first episode of the second season of the cooking competition show Snackmasters.

=== National Tim Tam Day ===
In order to promote the biscuit, Arnott's has proclaimed 16 February to be National Tim Tam Day. The day has involved a number of publicity stunts; for example, in 2019 the town of Tamworth, New South Wales, was temporarily renamed "Tim Tamworth".

For National Tim Tam Day 2022, Arnott's released through an online store a limited-edition range of Tim Tam merchandise including a perfume, slippers and a mug. The store returned in November 2022 with the release of a Tim Tam-inspired body lotion, diffuser and candle.

For National Tim Tam Day 2024, Arnott's distributed samples of the biscuit renamed to "Tay Tam" in Melbourne, in honour of the singer-songwriter Taylor Swift, who was playing a concert at the Melbourne Cricket Ground for The Eras Tour.

== Tim Tam Slam ==
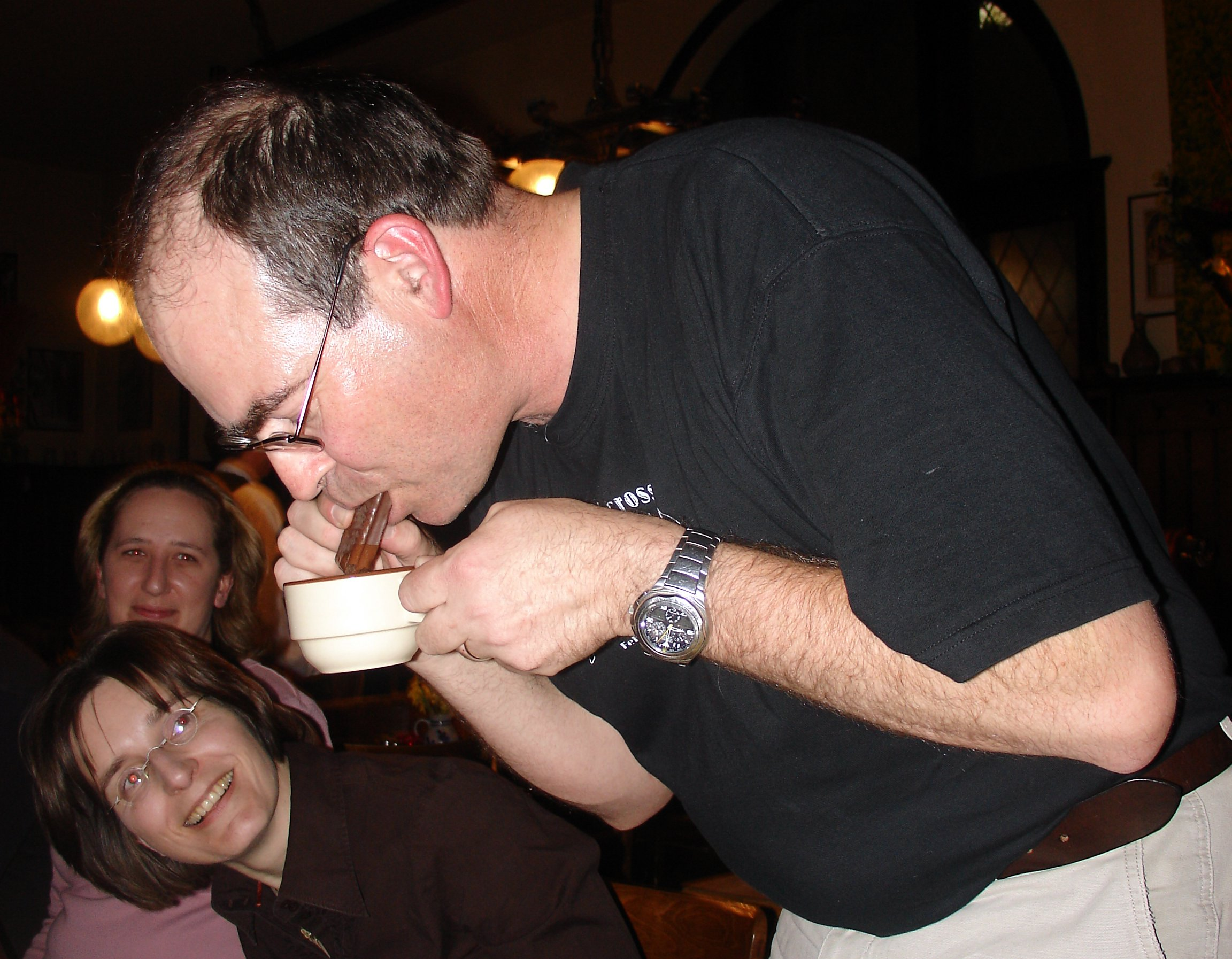
A man performing a Tim Tam Slam

The Tim Tam Slam (also known as the Tim Tam Shotgun, Tim Tam Bomb, Tim Tam Explosion, Tim Tam Bong and Tim Tam Suck) is the practice of drinking a hot beverage through a Tim Tam. The opposite corners of the Tim Tam are bitten off, one end is submerged in the beverage, and the beverage is sucked through the biscuit as though the Tim Tam itself were a straw. The crisp interior biscuit is eventually softened and the outer chocolate coating begins to melt, at which point the biscuit is eaten.

The Arnott's company used the name "Tim Tam Suck" in a 2002 advertising campaign.

In February 2019, Arnott's released a Slams-branded version of the Tim Tam biscuit.

== Similar products ==
Apart from Penguins, products similar to Tim Tams have included Woolworths' home brand product Choccy Slams, the Coles brand Chocolate Surrenders, Aldi's Just Divine line of biscuits under their Belmont Biscuits brand, and various similar "home-brand" products marketed by British supermarkets.

New Zealand's Griffin's Foods manufactures a counterpart to Tim Tams called Chit Chats. Jumbo supermarkets in the Netherlands sold a counterpart under the name "Dip&Nip Cookies". In 2021, Trader Joe's in the United States released their own take on the biscuit, branding them Aussie-style Chocolate Crème Sandwich Cookies.

In 2003, Arnott's sued Dick Smith Foods over their Temptin brand of chocolate biscuits, which Arnott's alleged had diluted their trademark as a similar biscuit to Tim Tams, in similarly designed packaging. The case was settled out of court. Dick Smith Foods also previously released a Tim Tam clone under the name "TTs".
