= Jatz =

Australian cracker

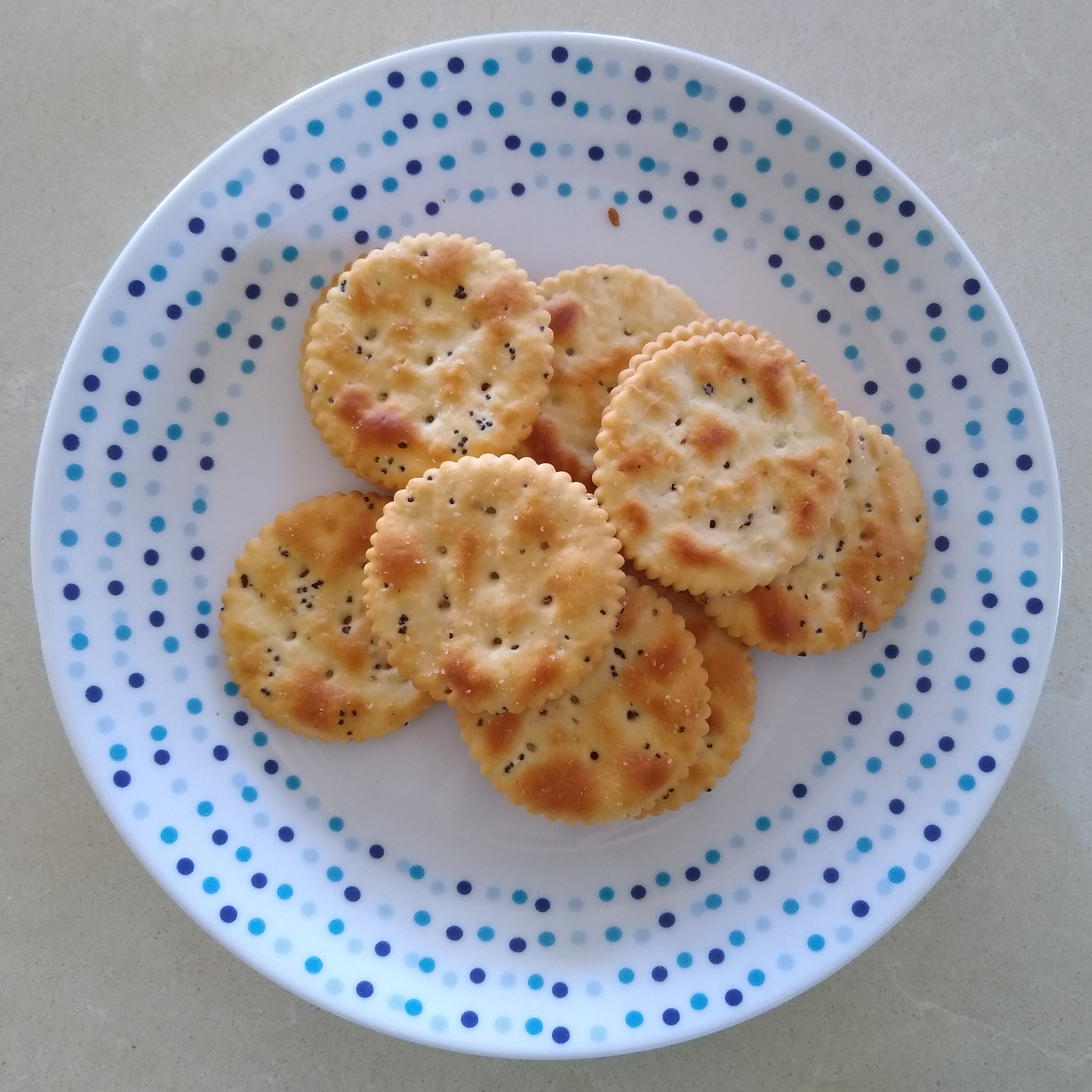
- Product type: Cracker
- Current owner: Arnott's Biscuits
- Produced by: Arnott's Biscuits
- Country: Australia
- Introduced: 1952
- Markets: Australia
- Previous owners: Savoy owned by Brockhoff Biscuits until 1963 merger
- Registered as a trademark in: Jatz: Australia, 1952; Savoy: Australia, 1990
- Tagline: Baked, not fried
- Website: arnotts.com/products/crackers

Jatz is a brand of malted Australian cracker introduced by Arnott's Biscuits in 1952. The crackers are circular, about 5 cm in diameter, lightly salted on one side and have a scalloped edge. It is typically eaten with cheese, dips, Vegemite or by itself. It is available in original, cracked pepper, fat-free and mini varieties.

== Savoy ==
Savoy is an extremely similar cracker initially introduced by the Brockhoff Biscuits in Melbourne in 1938. While they were originally competitors, with the merger of Brockhoff and Arnott's in 1963, the decision was made to keep both products on store shelves. Today, besides branding, the difference between the two biscuits include the replacement of the full cream milk powder and malt in Jatz with golden syrup in Savoy.
