= Ballarat Showgrounds =

Coordinates: 37°32′25″S 143°50′53″E

The old Ballarat Showgrounds (officially Ballarat Showgrounds and Recreation Reserve) was a multi-purpose venue in Wendouree, a suburb of Ballarat, Victoria, Australia, owned by the City of Ballarat from 1934 to 2024 and was the venue for the annual Ballarat Agricultural and Pastoral Society (BAPS) Show (an official public holiday in Ballarat).

The focus of the Ballarat Show is the display of rural industry, including livestock and produce, with associated competitions and awards. The show also features amusement rides, a sideshow alley and showbags, which are carry-bags full of novelties and sweet-treats produced by various commercial enterprises.

The facilities were used all year round for Trash and Treasure market (since 1979) as well as occasional collectors markets, show and shine displays and other events.

In 2013-2014, the City of Ballarat initially proposed to redevelop the showgrounds, and in 2015 the council and agricultural society further proposed relocation of the showgrounds to Victoria Park in Newington. During the state election of 2014, the Andrews Government committed $5.5 million (AUD) toward the development of the showgrounds. In 2017 the Agricultural Society in consultation with the Ballarat Council agreed that the existing showgrounds should be sold for redevelopment and proceeds from the sale of the existing land coupled with monies committed from the state government would be used to develop a modern, larger exhibition facility at a greenfield site at Mount Rowan 4 km north of the existing site by 2025.

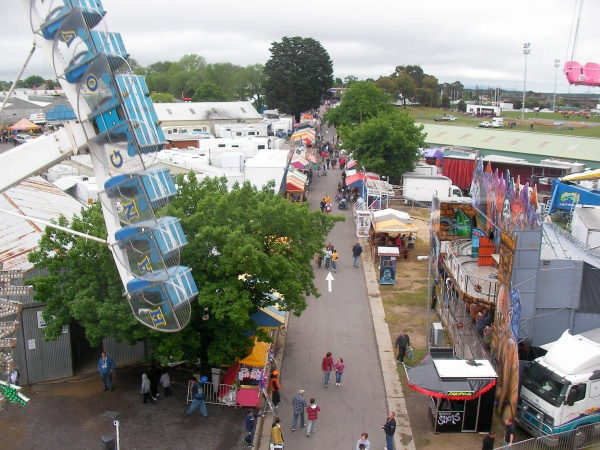
Beggs Avenue from the Ferris wheel during the 2010 Ballarat Show

== Site ==
The 10-hectare (25-acre) site included Eureka Stadium, which hosts Australian rules football and a number of other display areas and enclosed pavilions.

There were a number of sealed roads servicing the site which were used as pedestrian thoroughfares during the show. The main entrance was located at the corner of Creswick Road and Howitt Streets.

The main thoroughfare was Beggs Avenue which cut diagonally across the site and fed into Bolte Place and most of the animal displays. On the northern flank of Beggs Avenue was where the majority of carnival rides were normally placed. Whykes Street was the other main road and fed along the southern border of the site. This roadway contained the Howitt Street Pavilion which was used as a permanent market stall shed throughout the year and used during the show partly for the sideshow alley to house static displays.

There were a number of large permanent pavilions built throughout the grounds which housed merchandise stalls, show animals, static, craft and machinery displays.

== History ==
The Ballarat Agricultural and Pastoral Society was formed in 1856 and based in Learmonth. The first agricultural show in Ballarat city was held in 1859. In 1861 the society's showgrounds site was relocated to Lake Wendouree on the North East flank of the lake in an area bounded by Wendouree Parade, Burnbank and Gregory Streets. In 1934 a new site was chosen at the corner of Howitt Street and Creswick Road, Wendouree with all annual shows being held at that location until 2023.

Following World War 2, a number of surplus 'P huts' and buildings were relocated from the former Ballarat RAAF Base's Wireless and Air Gunnery School for use as administration buildings and pavilions. Many of those buildings remained in use until the closure of the facility.

In 1951 a 670-yard-long (610 m), sand-based harness-racing arena was built that featured two large light towers and overhead lighting gantries. The arena became the home of the Ballarat and District Trotting Club (the oldest harness racing club in Australia) and regularly hosted meetings between 14 April 1952 to December 1965. The Ballarat and District Trotting Club subsequently and permanently relocated to a new purpose-built harness racing complex (Bray Raceway) in the Ballarat suburb of Redan in February 1966. The showgrounds trotting arena subsequently deteriorated and was finally dismantled in 1990, being replaced by the Eureka Stadium (now commercially known as Mars Stadium) and the North Ballarat Sports Club. A smaller grassed animal parade and display area was established between the new stadium and the showgrounds pavilions.

In November 2023 the showgrounds hosted their last BAP show and in June 2024 their last public event, the Victorian annual sheepdog trials. The facility was closed soon after with demolition commencing in September 2024 and completed in December of that year.

== See also ==
- Royal Melbourne Show
- Royal Geelong Show
