= Fun Fare =

Fun-Fare is a 2014 album by Japanese duo Every Little Thing.

Fun Fare may also refer to:

- Fun Fare (comic), a British children's comic published 1946
- FunFare, a 2009–2010 American children's magazine title of Wizard Entertainment
- Fun Fare; a Treasury of Reader's Digest Wit and Humor, first issued 1949

== See also ==
- Fan Fare, an American syndicated cartoon strip by Walt Ditzen
- Funfair (disambiguation)
