= COVID-19 pandemic in Victoria =

- Disease: COVID-19
- Pathogen: SARS-CoV-2
- Location: Victoria, Australia
- First outbreak: Wuhan, Hubei, China
- Index case: Melbourne
- Arrival date: 19 January 2020
- Confirmed cases: 2,987,961 (as of 3 November 2023)
- Active cases: 1,393 (as of 3 November 2023)
- Hospitalised cases: 233 (as of 3 November 2023)
- Critical cases: 13 (as of 3 November 2023)
- Recovered: 2,978,074 (as of 3 November 2023)
- Deaths: 8,494 (as of 3 November 2023)
- Fatality rate: 0.29%

Government website
- www.coronavirus.vic.gov.au

The COVID-19 pandemic in Victoria was part of the worldwide pandemic of the coronavirus disease 2019 (COVID-19) caused by severe acute respiratory syndrome coronavirus 2 (SARS-CoV-2). The first confirmed case in the state of Victoria, also the first in Australia, was identified as being on 19 January 2020, when a man from Wuhan arrived by air from Guangdong, China. His test results on 25 January confirmed he had COVID-19.

== Timeline ==
=== 2020 ===
==== First lockdown ====
On 10 March 2020, Victorian Premier Daniel Andrews warned Victorians to expect "extreme measures" in the wake of the federal government updating the travel advice for Italy. These included cancelling major sporting events, requiring entire economic sectors to work from home, and calling recently retired health professionals to return to work.

A state of emergency was declared on 16 March, which was extended on 12 April, with existing directions remaining in place including staying at home, restrictions on particular activities, detention, restrictions on airports and cruise ships, aged care, hospitals and isolation for people diagnosed with COVID-19. It was extended further on 11 May, and again on 19 July to 16 August.

On 22 March 2020, the school holiday was brought forward from 27 to 24 March 2020.

On 14 April 2020, Victorian Health Minister Jenny Mikakos announced that Victoria would have the widest coronavirus testing in Australia, with anyone having COVID-19 symptoms able to get tested. The statement was issued that those who presented with fever or chills, in the absence of any other alternative diagnosis that explained the issue, or acute respiratory infection characterised by coughing, sore throat or shortness of breath should be tested for coronavirus.

==== Second lockdown ====
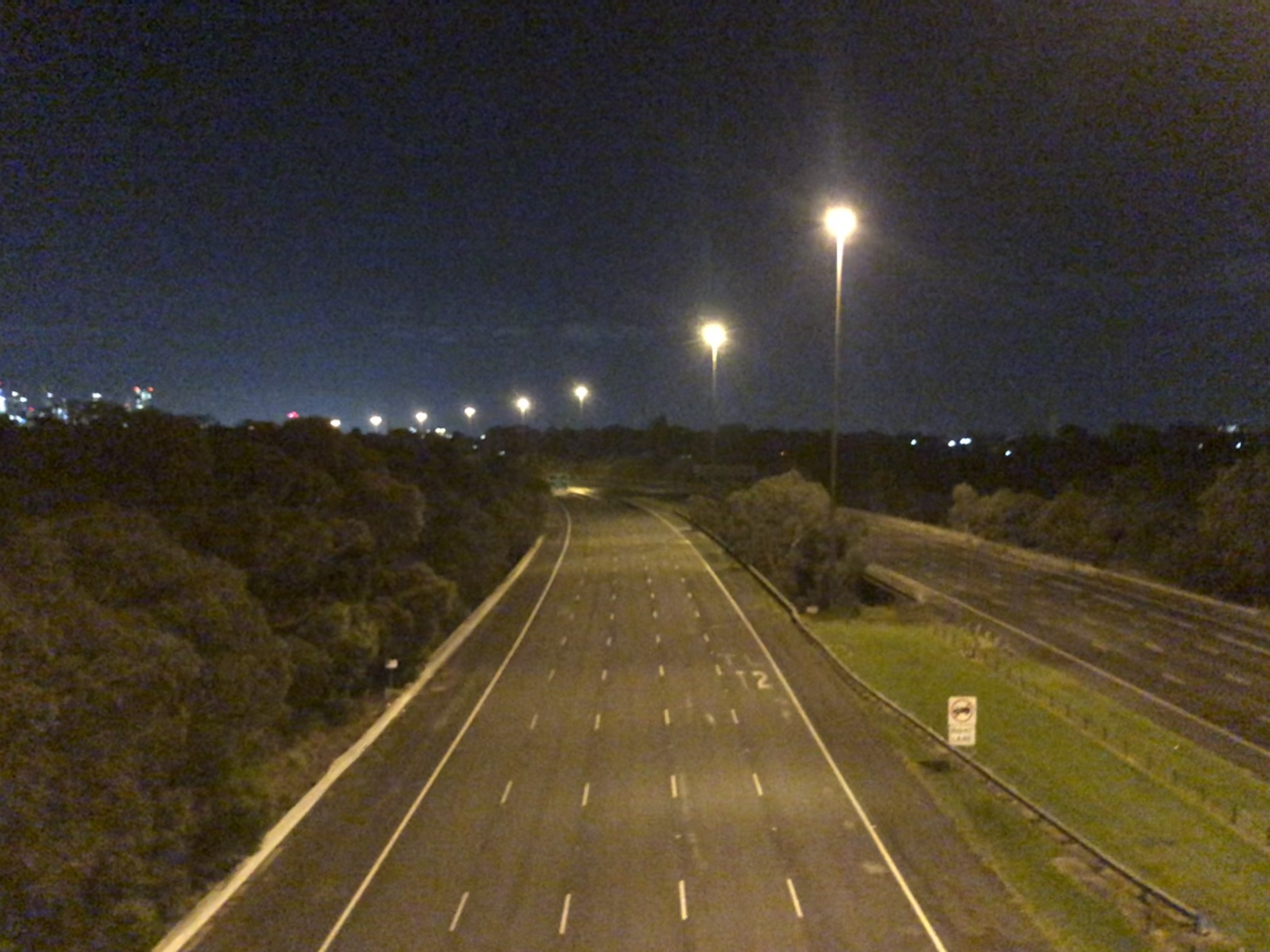
Eastern Freeway during Melbourne's COVID lockdown

On 20 June 2020, the Victorian Government re-tightened restrictions on household gatherings following a spike in community transmitted cases over the previous week, reported to be mainly caused by family-to-family transmission in large household gatherings. From 22 June, households could once again only have five visitors; and most easing of restrictions that were to take place were postponed.

On 30 June 2020, the Victorian Government re-enforced local lockdowns across 10 different Melbourne postcodes. Residents there would need to comply with the four acceptable reasons to leave their houses: shopping for essentials; for medical or compassionate needs; exercise in compliance with the public gathering restriction of two people; and for work or education purposes.

On 2 July 2020, the Victorian Premier Daniel Andrews announced the "Judicial Inquiry into Hotel Quarantine Program". This followed some cases of coronavirus in Victoria being linked by DNA sequencing to a breach in hotel quarantine infection control. The Inquiry was to "... examine the operation of Victoria's hotel quarantine program for returning travellers." It was headed by retired judge Jennifer Coate, and was scheduled to deliver its report to the Governor by 25 September. The inquiry was delayed by lockdown restrictions. Andrews noted that "it is abundantly clear that what has gone on here is completely unacceptable and we need to know exactly what has happened." An interim report was published on 6 November, and the inquiry's final report was published on 21 December. The Government response to the interim report was published in November.

On 4 July 2020, the Victorian Government announced two more postcodes affected by the lockdown until 29 July 2020. Nine public housing towers housing 3,000 residents were also added, with the additional condition that residents could not leave the tower under any circumstances for five days, with the possibility of an extension to 14 days. The Victorian ombudsman later found that the lockdown of the public housing towers breached human rights laws.

On 6 July, the Victorian and NSW state Governments announced that their interstate border would be re-closed from the start of 8 July.

On 7 July, after recording 191 new cases, Premier Andrews announced that metropolitan Melbourne and the Shire of Mitchell would re-enter lockdown from 12 am on 9 July, for 6 weeks.

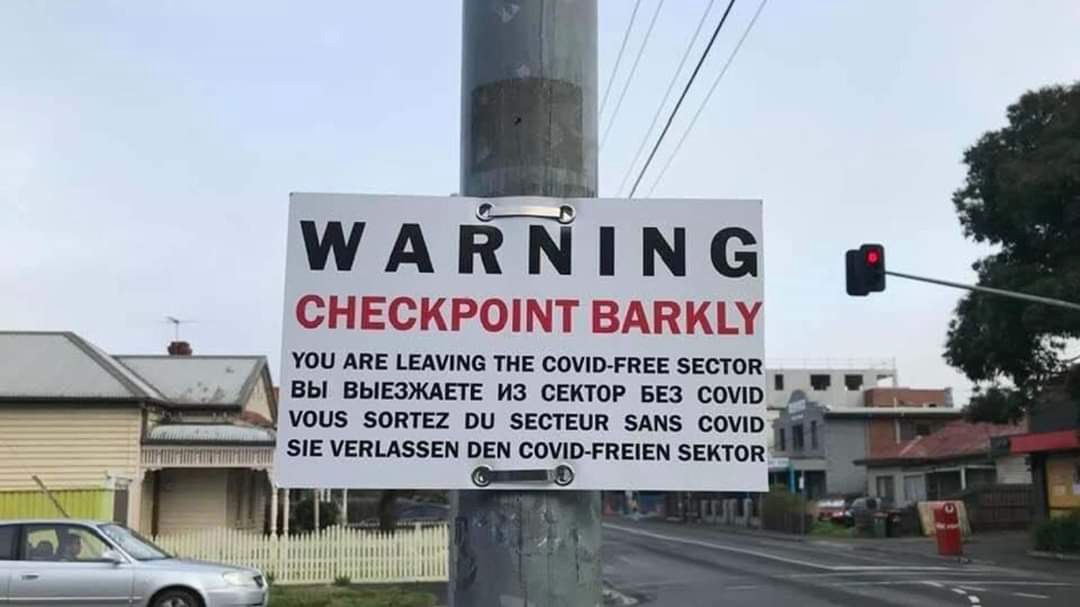
Humorous sign erected by West Footscray residents in June 2020, regarding the fact that West Footscray was under lockdown orders, but Footscray was not

On 19 July, following a "concerning increase in coronavirus cases", Premier Andrews announced that "face coverings" were to be made mandatory in metropolitan Melbourne, and Mitchell Shire. This was not enforced until after 11:59 p.m. on Wednesday 22 July to allow the populace time to acquire a face covering. In addition, the state of emergency was extended until 16 August 2020.

From 22 July, as the chance of coronavirus infection remained high in aged care and health care settings, visits were restricted to carers only, and with a limit of one hour per day.

From 23 July, "face coverings" in metropolitan Melbourne and Mitchell Shire became mandatory whenever residents left their homes. A fine of A$200 was imposed for those not complying, though medical and other exemptions were allowed, such as not being required for children under 12 years of age.

On 2 August, a state of disaster was declared and metropolitan Melbourne shifted to Stage 4 restrictions. A curfew across Melbourne from 8 p.m. to 5 a.m. was imposed, a 5 km (3.1 mi) radius restriction was added, and other restrictions that had previously been applied only to selected postcodes were applied to the whole of metropolitan Melbourne. A permit system was introduced for any residents that still needed to travel to work outside of their 5 km radius.

On 6 September (Father's Day), the "Roadmap for Reopening" was announced; a series of four steps towards "COVID Normal" which would begin on 13 September. In the "First Step", which applied to metropolitan Victoria, several restrictions were eased, including a reduction of the curfew, some loosening of rules around outdoor exercise and social interactions, the introduction of a "bubble" that allowed single people living alone to nominate one person to be allowed to visit them during the first two steps, and increased limits for weddings, funerals and religious gatherings. At the same time, it was announced that regional Victoria would move to the "Second Step", which included a staged return of students to onsite learning as well as the reopening of outdoor public pools and further increases to limits for weddings, funerals and religious gatherings.

On 18 October 2020, regional Victoria moved to "Step Three", which included the reopening of most businesses to the public, increased seating for hospitality, the allowance of visitors for all residents and the resumption of some indoor sports. At the same time, the 5 km limit in metropolitan Victoria was increased to 25 km (16 mi) and the two-hour time limit was removed. However, the border between metropolitan and regional Victoria (often referred to as the "ring of steel") was strengthened with extra checkpoints added.

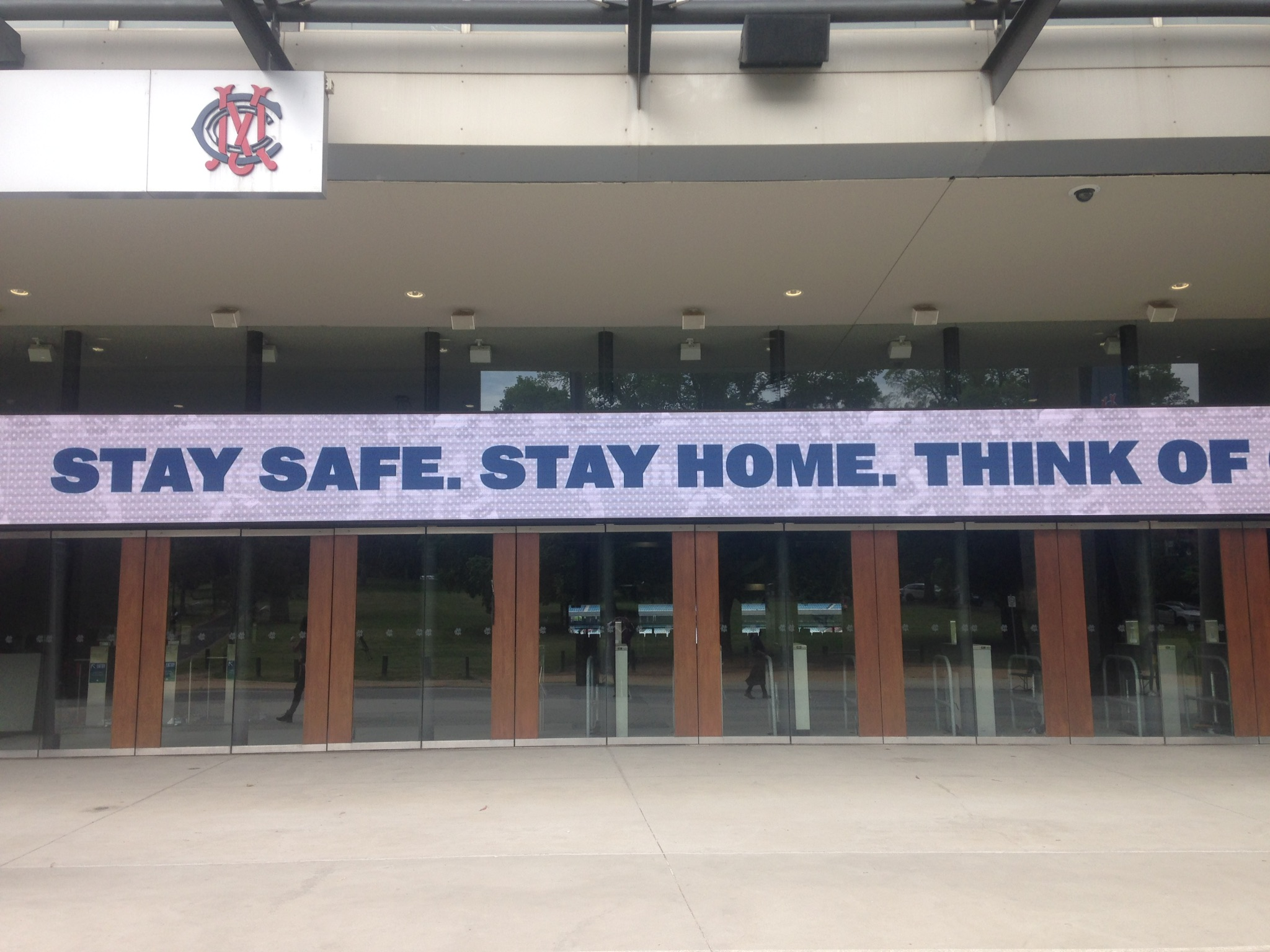
Gate 2 of the Melbourne Cricket Ground ahead of the 2020 AFL Grand Final, which was played in Brisbane

On 26 October, metropolitan restrictions were eased, with residents allowed to leave home for any reason, all retail businesses allowed to reopen, hospitality venues allowed to seat patrons, further relaxations on outdoor gatherings, and allowance of visitors to all residents, with some caveats. The 25 km restriction and "Ring of steel" remained in place, however. With a length of 112 days, Victoria's second lockdown was the then longest continuous lockdown world-wide.

On 8 November, metropolitan restrictions were brought into line with regional restrictions with travel now being allowed to and from anywhere in the state. Indoor recreation, community and entertainment venues were also reopened. Restrictions on accommodation were also loosened in an effort to encourage intrastate tourism. It was also announced that, subject to public health advice, Victoria would move to the "Last Step" on 22 November.

On 27 November 2020, Victoria recorded its 28th consecutive day of 0 new cases and 0 deaths, and had 0 active cases, epidemiologically eliminating the virus.

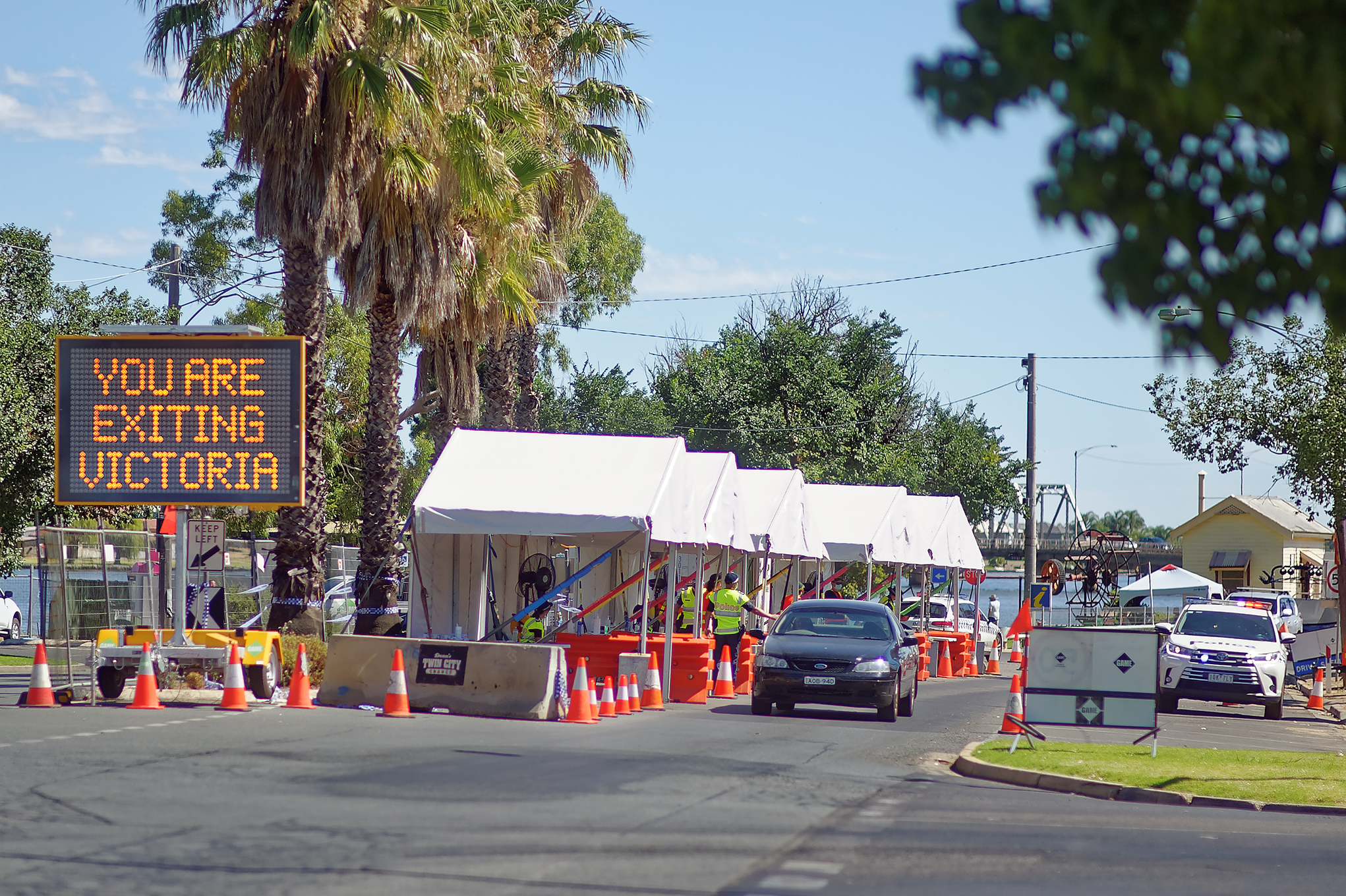
Victoria Police checkpoint at Yarrawonga on 12 January 2021

==== Resumption of hotel quarantine ====
On 30 November, the Victorian government announced that a new dedicated agency, "COVID-19 Quarantine Victoria" (CQV), had been created. The interim Commissioner of CQV is the Commissioner of Corrections, Emma Cassar. CQV is part of the government's response to the COVID-19 Hotel Quarantine Enquirys' interim report. It will oversee all parts of the Victorian quarantine program: mandatory quarantine for people entering Australia, Health Hotels for positive and suspected cases, or close contacts, and Frontline Worker Accommodation. The CQV Commissioner will be supported by three Deputy State Controllers. Deputy Chief Health Officer Professor Ben Cowie will lead the CQVs' health management. Victoria Police Deputy Commissioner Ross Guenther will provide expertise in enforcement. As of 15 January 2021 the third Controller was still to be appointed. On 5 May 2021, the CQV general manager of infection control, Matius Bush, was stood down by the Minister for Government Services Danny Pearson pending a conduct review. Bush breached infection controls twice by: refusing a COVID test at a quarantine hotel when requested by Defence personnel; and failing to sanitise or change his mask when returning to a quarantine hotel from a coffee shop. Reports about the breaches were leaked and published in The Australian newspaper.

On 17 December, the Victorian ombudsman tabled a report in the Victorian Parliament in which she found the 4 July lockdown of public housing towers In Melbourne breached human rights laws.

On 30 December, Victoria's 61-day streak of zero community cases came to an end as three community cases were identified, linked to the New South Wales outbreak. As a precautionary measure for New Year's Eve the Victorian Government reduced household gatherings from 30 people to 15 and mandated masks within an indoor setting. The border to New South Wales closed at 11:59 pm on 31 December, with returning Victorian residents from "green zones" that returned before the deadline made to isolate until they received a negative test result. Those that returned afterwards would have to get tested and isolate for 14 days, aligning the restrictions with visitors from the Northern Beaches and Greater Sydney that had been enforced 11 days prior.

=== 2021 ===
On 3 February 2021, a quarantine hotel worker at the Grand Hyatt Melbourne, a "resident support officer" involved in the Australian Open tennis quarantine program, was found to have COVID-19. From 11:59 pm Victoria immediately reintroduced some rules, tightened some, and put off imminent easing of some restrictions. The plan, from 8 February (Monday), to allow up to 75 per cent of office workers back into their workplaces was put on hold. Masks were mandatory indoors, and only 15 persons were allowed at private events. The infected man had visited at least 14 businesses from 29 January to 1 February, but was able to give contact tracers a detailed list of places and times. Persons who were at those places at those times were tested and isolated for 14 days. Testing site hours were extended from 4 February, opening at 8 am. More drive-through lanes were added, and additional testing sites opened. By 5 February, genomic sequencing confirmed that the Hyatt worker was infected with the more contagious "UK strain" of COVID-19.

==== Third lockdown ====
On 12 February, it was announced that a five-day lockdown under Stage 4 restrictions would take effect beginning at 11:59 pm. AEDT, due to a cluster of 13 cases tied to a Holiday Inn quarantine hotel near Melbourne Airport, which have been assumed to be the UK variant. It was alleged by health officials to have been spread on a hotel floor due to a patient's use of an aerosol-generating nebuliser, which is normally banned under hotel quarantine. By 14 February the cluster had grown to 16, and by 16 February, the number of confirmed infections had increased to 19. By 19 February, the Melbourne Holiday Inn outbreak had increased to 22, one person was admitted to intensive care, and about 3,515 contacts were quarantined.

Residents were not to leave their homes except for essential shopping, exercise, caregiving, essential work, or participating in a professional sporting event. They were also limited to shop or exercise within five kilometres of their homes. During this time, face masks were mandatory at all times out-of-home, with all public gatherings banned, and all schools closed. As they accounted for the majority of UK variant cases, international arrivals into Victoria were also suspended. All Australian states and territories placed travel restrictions upon Victoria. Premier Andrews stated that these infections were "moving at a velocity that has not been seen anywhere in our country over the course of these last 12 months." Special dispensation was given to the 2021 Australian Open, which became crowdless effective 11:30 pm AEDT on 12 February in the midst of the night's final match (play was temporarily suspended at that time to remove all spectators from the court).

The lockdown was lifted as anticipated at 11:59 pm on 17 February. Despite this, Victoria did not allow any incoming international flights "indefinitely".

Remaining restrictions included:

- Masks mandatory inside,
- Masks outdoors when unable to keep social distance,
- 5 person limit on home visits,
- 20 person limit for outdoor gatherings.

==== May ====
As of 9 May 2021 Victoria had no cases of community transmission for 72 days.

On 24 May in northern Melbourne, 4 cases of COVID-19 in the community were reported; this broke Victoria's streak of 86 days with no community transmission. Another 5 community cases, for a total of 9, were reported on 25 May. 4 of them were family contacts of a man, who may have been the source of the outbreak, who tested positive on 2 May. As a result, restrictions in Greater Melbourne were again tightened from 6pm on Tuesday, 25 May, to at least Friday, 4 June. Restrictions included:

- mandatory wearing of masks indoors (children under 12 exempted)
- private gatherings, limited to 5 people
- public gatherings, limited 30 people
- limits on visitors to hospitals and aged care reinstated
- Melbourne residents were allowed to travel out of the city, but had to observe restrictions as if they were still in Melbourne
- no changes to the number of people allowed in workplaces, shops, bars, or beauty services.

Relaxation of "density caps" in hospitality venues which had been planned, was put on hold. Cultural and sports event were allowed, but the AFL "paused" ticket sales for Victorian-based games.

==== Fourth lockdown ====
By 27 May the Melbourne outbreak had risen to 26 cases. There were over 150 exposure sites and 11,000 contacts had been linked through contact tracing to the outbreak. As a result of the growing outbreak Victoria entered its fourth lockdown, statewide, as of 11:59pm on 27 May. The restrictions were initially planned to last for at least 7 days until 11:59pm on 3 June. By 1 June the number of cases in the Victorian outbreak had reached 60 and on 2 June the lockdown was extended for another 7 days. By June 7 there were 81 active COVID cases in the outbreak. The lockdown ended, with some restrictions remaining, just before midnight on 10 June.
During the lockdown leaving home was initially only allowed for 5 reasons:

- Food and supply shopping (only within 5 kilometres (3.1 miles) of home)
- Authorised work
- Care and caregiving, health
- Exercising, for up to two hours:
  - with no more than one other person
  - within 5 km of home
- To get a COVID-19 vaccination.

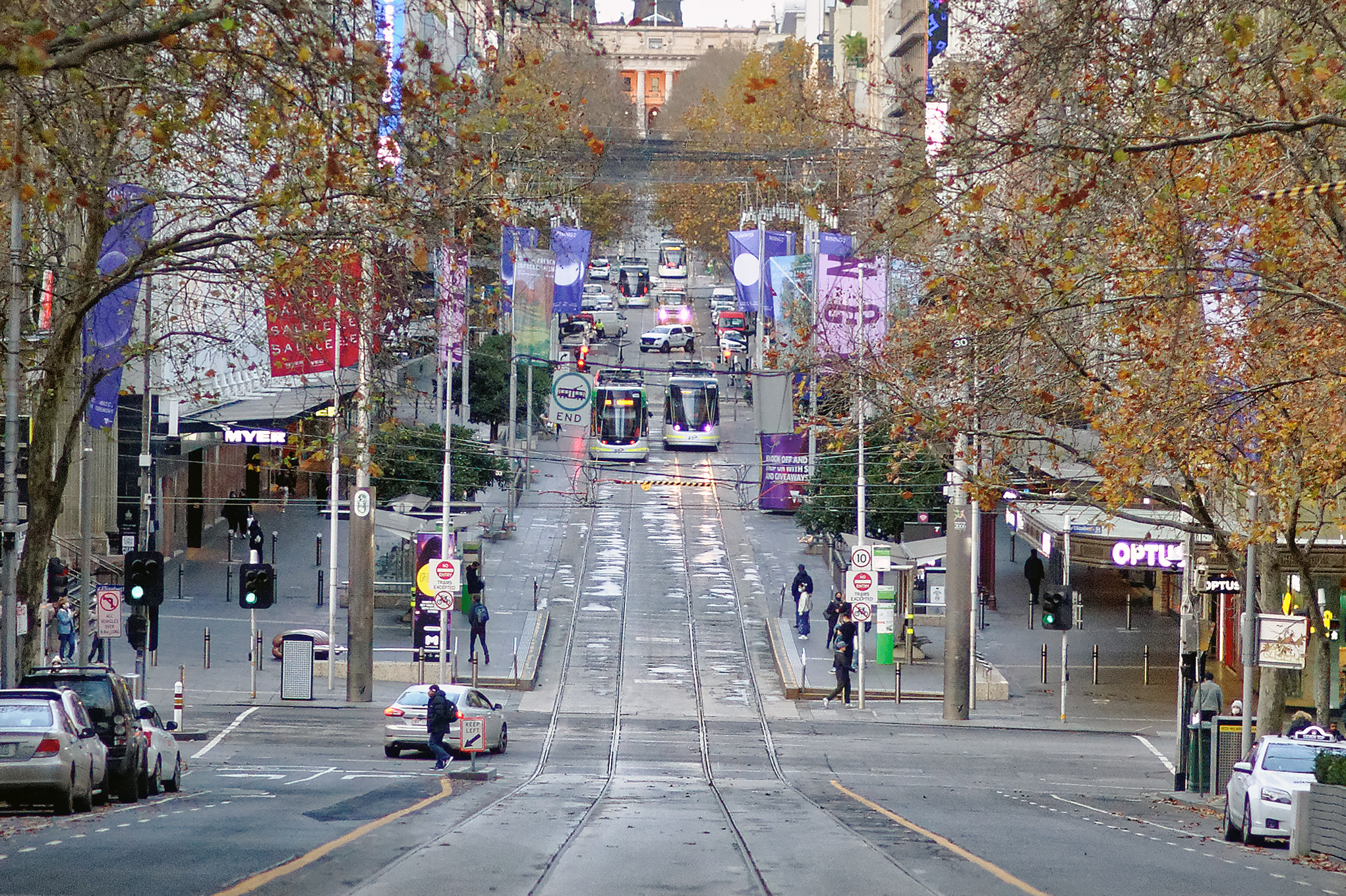
Afternoon peak hour in Bourke Street, Melbourne, 4 June 2021, during the fourth lockdown

Otherwise:

- Schools closed (some exemptions)
- Higher education, online only
- Childcare centres and kindergartens, stay open
- Hairdressers, beauty salons and similar, closed
- Entertainment venues, closed
- Only take-away food allowed from cafes and restaurants
- No public or private gatherings
- No hospital or nursing home visits (some exemptions)
- Funerals limited to 10 people, plus those running the event
- Weddings not allowed (some exemptions)
- Masks mandatory outside the home, unless exempted.

There were anti-lockdown protests in Melbourne on 28 May.

Due to the outbreak, all Australian states imposed a range of restrictions on travellers from Victoria, either banning entry, only allowing state residents back in, requiring home isolation for 7 days under Victorias' rules, 14 days hotel quarantine, or other measures. New Zealand paused the travel bubble with Victoria from 7:59pm on 25 May. As a result of the pausing of the travel bubble, the Melbourne Rebels' scheduled Super Rugby Trans-Tasman match against the Highlanders was forced to be relocated from Queenstown, New Zealand to Sydney. On 3 June the stay-at-home order from NSW Health, for anyone in NSW who had been in Victoria since May 27, was extended by a week.

The fourth lockdown meant that a number of other interstate professional sporting matches that were due that week had to either be played in empty stadiums, or relocated to alternative venues. The A-League match between Western United and Melbourne Victory on 28 May, the AFL match between the Western Bulldogs and Melbourne on 28 May and the AFL matches scheduled on 29 May (Collingwood against Geelong at the MCG and St Kilda against North Melbourne at Marvel Stadium) were played in empty stadiums, while the AFL match between Richmond and Adelaide scheduled for Sunday 30 May and the NRL match between the Melbourne Storm and the Gold Coast Titans scheduled for 5 June were both relocated interstate, to Sydney and the Sunshine Coast respectively.

After the number of cases in the Victorian outbreak had reached 60 by 1 June, on 2 June the lockdown in metropolitan Melbourne was extended for another 7 days. Some restrictions were eased:

- the 5 km travel limit was extended to 10 km (6.2 miles),
- school attendance allowed for years 11 and 12,
- authorised work now includes some outdoors work.

Use of the Service Victoria QR code check-in was required across Victoria for places like supermarkets and shops.

The Victorian outbreak rose to 63 cases by 3 June, all in Greater Melbourne. As a result, from 11:59 pm that day some lockdown restrictions in regional Victoria were eased:

- movement in regional areas was unrestricted (to Melbourne was still restricted)
- students could return to school

There were 81 active COVID cases in the outbreak by June 7. There were also 3 separate clusters with unknown sources in Victoria by then: 32 cases in Whittlesea; 9 at the Arcare aged care centre in Maidstone; and 14 at a cluster in West Melbourne. The West Melbourne cluster was found to be of the fast spreading Delta COVID variant, raising the possibility the fourth Victorian lockdown could be extended again.

The lockdown ended on 10 June at 11:59 pm, with some restrictions remaining.

- no visitors in the home
- must wear a mask both indoors and outdoors
- travel limited to 25 km (16 mi) radius of home.

==== June ====
Due to a growing cluster in Bondi, Sydney, from 11:59pm on 24 June, border entry was barred to non-Victorian residents who had been in Greater Sydney and Wollongong in the previous 14 days as those areas were considered to be red zones. Returning Victorians had to get a red zone permit and quarantine at home for 14 days.

==== July ====
From 11:59pm on 11 July, Victoria closed its border to all New South Wales and Australian Capital Territory residents to try to prevent the delta variant entering the state. ACT Chief Minister Andrew Barr tweeted that it was "incredibly disappointing and frustrating" after more than a year with no local COVID-19 cases that the border was being closed to Canberrans. 'Border bubble' arrangements for border towns remained in place.

==== Fifth lockdown ====
On 14 July, after 11 COVID cases were detected in the state, Victoria reintroduced the requirement to wear face masks in workplaces, in schools, and when social distancing was not possible, outdoors. Most cases were linked to removalists from NSW who picked up from the Ariele apartments in Maribyrnong on 8 July without face masks. On return to NSW the removalists tested positive. As a result, the apartment block, with 130 residents, was put into a 14-day lockdown on 13 July, which was 'reset' by the new cases.

On 15 July, it the Premier announced that Victoria would enter a snap lockdown for 5 days from 11:59pm on 15 July (Thursday) until 11:59pm on 20 July (Tuesday). This was the third Victorian lockdown in 2021, and the fifth since the start of the pandemic in Australia. There were 18 cases in this outbreak in Victoria, 4 recorded on this day, all of which linked back to "incursions" from NSW. There were 1,500 primary close contacts and 75 exposure sites in Victoria.

On 20 July the Premier announced that Victoria's snap lockdown would be extended, with current settings to continue for the next seven days until Tuesday, 27 July at 11.59pm - the Delta variant was confounding Victoria's public health experts and is moving faster than anything they've seen before.

On 22 July, the death of a 48-year-old woman from Victoria the previous week was linked by the Therapeutic Goods Administration (TGA) to "probable" thrombosis with thrombocytopenia syndrome (TTS), after vaccination with AstraZeneca.

On 24 July there was an anti-lockdown protest in Melbourne. There were 6 arrests, 4 people charged, and 74 infringement notices issued. There were also protests in Brisbane, and in Sydney where several people were arrested, infringement notices issued and over 50 people charged. Assistant police commissioner Luke Cornelius responded: "It beggars belief that the protest today could, if mass spreading occurs, result in an extension of the very thing they are protesting for: an end to the current lockdown and a reopening of business, which is something we are all working so hard to achieve."

On 27 July at 11:59pm the 5th lockdown was lifted with strict restrictions still remaining.

- no visitors in the home
- must wear a mask both indoors and outdoors
- students can return to school
- public gatherings are limited to 10 people
- pubs, restaurants, bars, gyms and retail can reopen with density limits
- community sport is back but spectators not allowed

==== Sixth lockdown ====
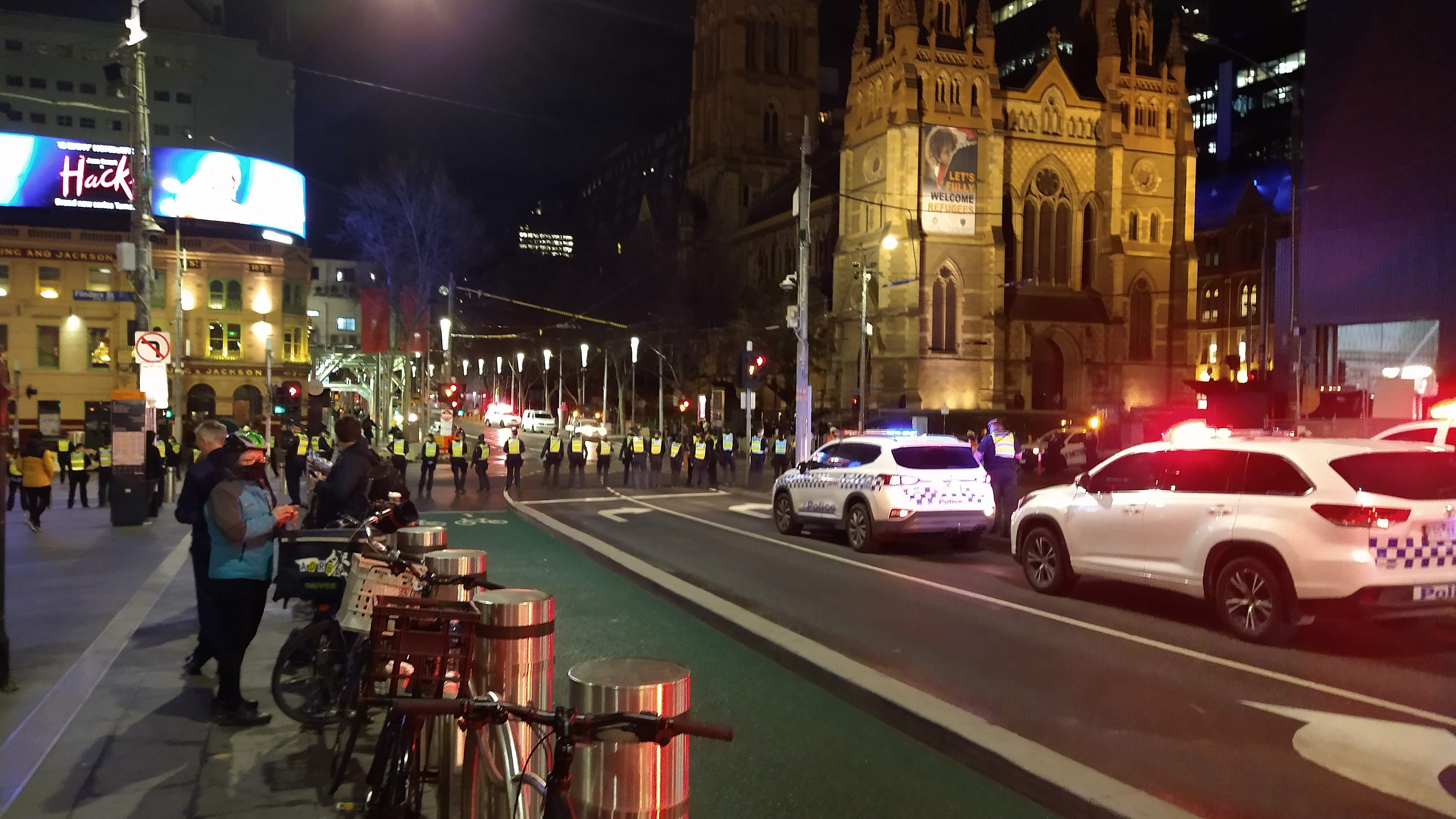
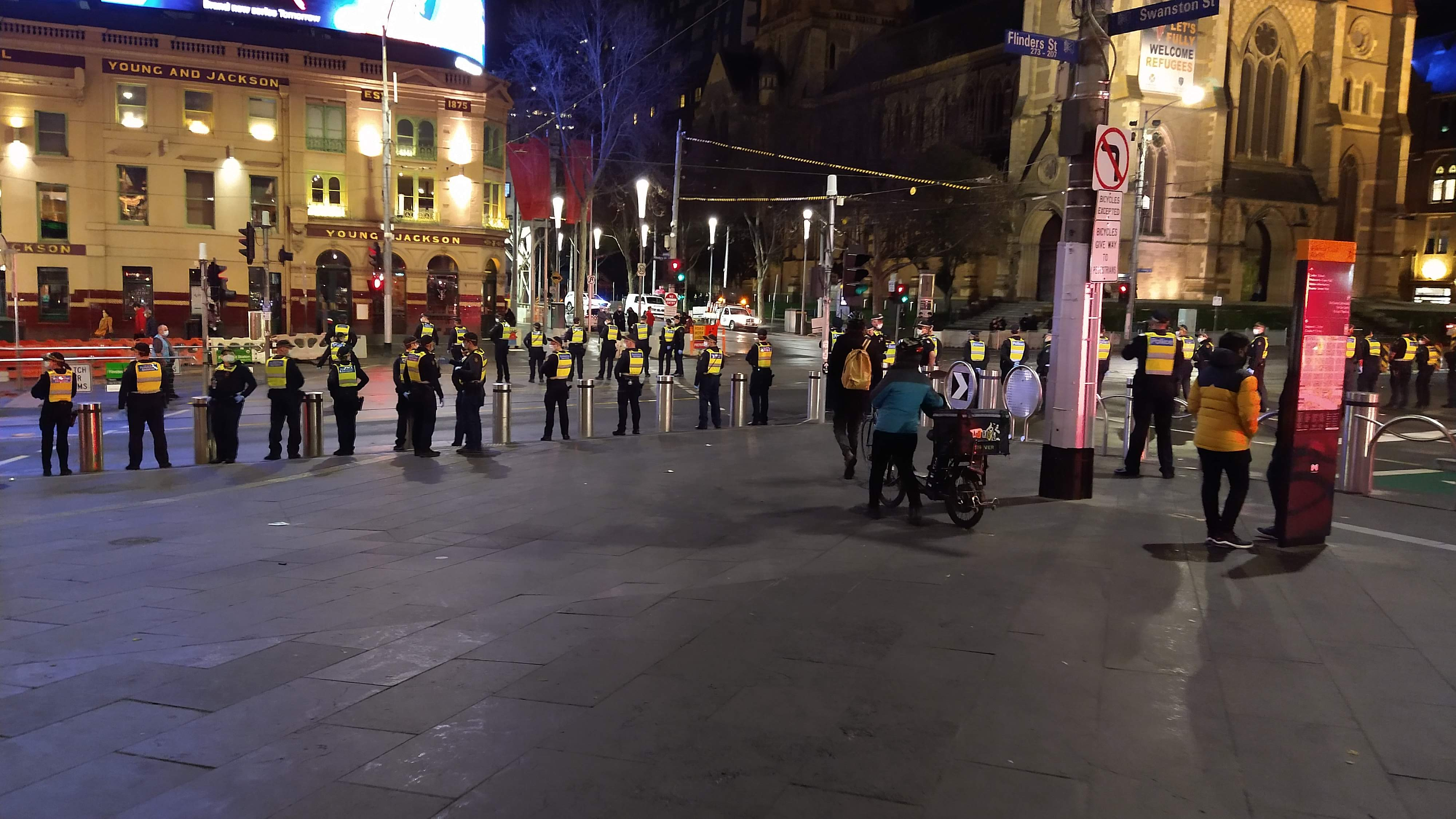
Police immediately after anti-lockdown protests on Flinders Street (around 8:30pm on 5 August 2021)

On 5 August 2021, in response to the detection of six new community cases, the Victorian Government announced their sixth lockdown, commencing that evening at 8 pm for seven days. At about 7pm that day there was an anti-lockdown protest of up to 400 people in Flinders Street, Melbourne.

Regional Victoria was released from its sixth lockdown at 11:59pm on 9 August.

On 11 August the lockdown was extended for 7 days. This followed the state having 20 new cases, 5 with an unknown source.

On 16 August the lockdown was extended for another 14 days, with the overnight curfew reinstated and a target end date of 2 September.

On 19 August, Melbourne marked 200 days of lockdowns since the beginning of the pandemic.

On 4 October, Melbourne marked 245 days of lockdowns and became the city with the longest cumulative time in lockdown in the world.

On 21 October, Melbourne ended its final lockdown with a total 262 cumulative days of strict stay-at-home orders, making it one of the most locked down cities in the world.

==== Regional Victoria - Seventh lockdown ====
On 21 August at 1pm, regional Victoria was also placed into its seventh lockdown and other restrictions tightened, such as the 5 km limit for essential shopping, and exercise activities. Hospitality was again takeaway only, most retail stores closed and schooling online only. Sporting venues, skate parks, playgrounds, and outdoor exercise equipment all closed. Construction statewide returned to a 25 per cent capacity limit. The 9pm-5am curfew in metropolitan Melbourne was not enacted in regional Victoria. This action followed 61 new state cases of COVID-19 on 19 August, one in Shepparton. By the afternoon of 20 August rapid PCR testing brought the cluster in Shepparton at least 21 cases. 48 of the new locally acquired cases from 19 August were linked to known outbreaks, 22 were in isolation during their infectious period. 11 separate "mystery cases" were in suburbs including Airport West, Frankston, Keysborough, Docklands and Yarraville. After there were 27 cases in 2 days at a childcare centre in Broadmeadows, among others, childcare centres were restricted to essential workers.

The same day there was another anti-lockdown protest in Melbourne city, which became violent. Up to 4,000 people marched and over 200 were arrested, 3 for assaulting police. Police responded with pepper spray when protesters threw objects at them. 7 police officers were injured, 6 of those hospitalised. 236 fines were issued. Those arrested were each fined AU$5,452. Smaller protests were also held in Adelaide, Brisbane, Darwin, Perth, and in Sydney where over 45 people were arrested.

On 29 August, following a year high 92 new cases detected in the community in a single day, the Victorian Government announced that the statewide lockdown was to be extended.

First deaths since 2020

On 31 August the deaths of 2 women with COVID-19 were reported in Victoria. The women both died at their homes, one was aged in her 40s from Darebin, the other was in her 60s from Hume. They were the first COVID deaths reported in Victoria since 30 November 2020, 9 months. The same day there were 76 new locally acquired cases, 45 linked to existing outbreaks and 36 in isolation while they were infectious.

==== September ====
On 1 September, following new cases reaching triple digits (120 cases) in a single day for the first time since 2 September 2020, the lockdown was extended again with a target end date of 23 September. An additional target was getting 70% of the eligible population of Victoria receiving their first dose of either the Pfizer or AstraZeneca vaccines by that date.

On 3 September, another overnight death from COVID-19 was reported, a man in his 60s, bringing state deaths to 823. There were also 208 new cases of COVID-19. There were 1,176 active cases coming from 48,572 test results on 2 September. That day around 6,000 tests were done in Shepparton, mostly day 13 tests of people in isolation. 33,511 doses of vaccine were administered too at state-run sites that day.

On 9 September there was another Victorian COVID-19 death. A Coburg man in his 70s died in hospital, he was not vaccinated, bringing state deaths to 824. There were 344 new locally acquired cases, of which 149 have been linked to known outbreaks. 127 (up 16) were hospitalised, 33 in ICU with 21 requiring a ventilator. 319,027 vaccinations were administered at state-run sites, and 42,998 test results were received. By this day, 64 per cent of Victorians had received their first dose of a COVID-19 vaccine.

Also on 9 September at 11:59 pm, lockdown restrictions in regional Victoria, except Greater Shepparton, were eased. Greater Shepparton's restrictions were eased on 15 September, with Ballarat re-entering lockdown on the same day.

On 14 September, the deaths of 2 more people were reported. They were:

- a man is his 20s from Hume, who died in his home and was only discovered to have COVID-19 after his death
- a woman in her 80s from Brimbank

Total deaths reached 826. There were also 445 new COVID cases. By the same day:

- Over 65% of the over 16-year-old population had received one dose of vaccine
- Over 40% were fully vaccinated.

On 15 September, another 2 deaths were reported, bringing state deaths to 828, as well as 443 new cases. There were 4,083 active cases, 173 were hospitalised, 44 in intensive care and 23 on ventilators.

Also on 15 September, at 11:59pm Ballarat went back into lockdown, its eighth, for at least 7 days. This followed the town having 4 COVID cases as well as "widespread" wastewater detection. The Ballarat International Foto Biennale photographic exhibition, already delayed from 28 August by the regional lockdown, had been rescheduled to open on the 15th.

On 17 September 2021, Victoria reached the milestone of 70% partially vaccination of the 16+ eligible population.

On 19 September, at 11:59pm Greater Geelong, Surf Coast Shire and Mitchell Shire went back into lockdown, their eighth, for at least 7 days. This followed both Greater Geelong and Mitchell reporting cases and Surf Coast showing positive waste water detections with no confirmed source. Greater Geelong and the Surf Coast exited lockdown by 27 September as scheduled, but the Mitchell Shire lockdown was extended with no set end date.

By 22 September, Victoria had another 3 deaths in 24 hours bringing the state COVID-19 death toll to 836, and 628 new cases, exceeding the previous record of 625 daily new cases set in 2020. The lockdown of Ballarat ended at midnight this day.

By 23 September there were another 4 deaths, taking the outbreak total to 20, and total state deaths to 240 since March 2020. With 766 new daily cases, another record high was set. Active cases were at 6,666.
The dead were:

- 3 men: 1 in his 70s and 1 his 80s both from Hume, and 1 in his 80s from Moreland
- 1 woman in her 90s from Hume

257 were hospitalised with COVID-19. Of these 257 there were:

- 60 in intensive care, 41 on ventilation
- 81% were not vaccinated, 15% partially vaccinated, only 3% fully vaccinated

State vaccinations were at:

- 45% double dose
- 75 per cent single dose

Victoria was rationing the Pfizer COVID-19 vaccine, with Premier Andrews blaming the Commonwealth government for supply issues.

Also notably by 23 September, at 235 days, Melbourne set a record for the world's longest lockdown. As of this date, the city was expected to be locked down until "late October".

On 26 September at 11:59pm, the 7 day Geelong and Surf Coast lockdowns ended as scheduled, but Mitchell Shire's lockdown was extended with no end date set.

On 28 September, the Latrobe Valley went into lockdown for 7 days. Restrictions were the same as Melbourne, but without a curfew.

===== Protests =====
On 20 September, there was a violent protest by hundreds of people against mandatory vaccination for construction workers outside the Construction, Forestry, Maritime, Mining and Energy Union (CFMEU) headquarters. In order to be allowed to work, tradespeople were required to have had at least one dose of vaccine by 23 September (Thursday). The union building was damaged and riot police employed pepper spray and rubber bullets. As a consequence, combined with an increase in transmission of COVID-19 in the industry, from 11.59pm that night all building and construction industry worksites in Ballarat, Geelong, Metropolitan Melbourne, Mitchell Shire and the Surf Coast were shut down for two weeks. By 5 October, 7 COVID cases were linked to this protest.

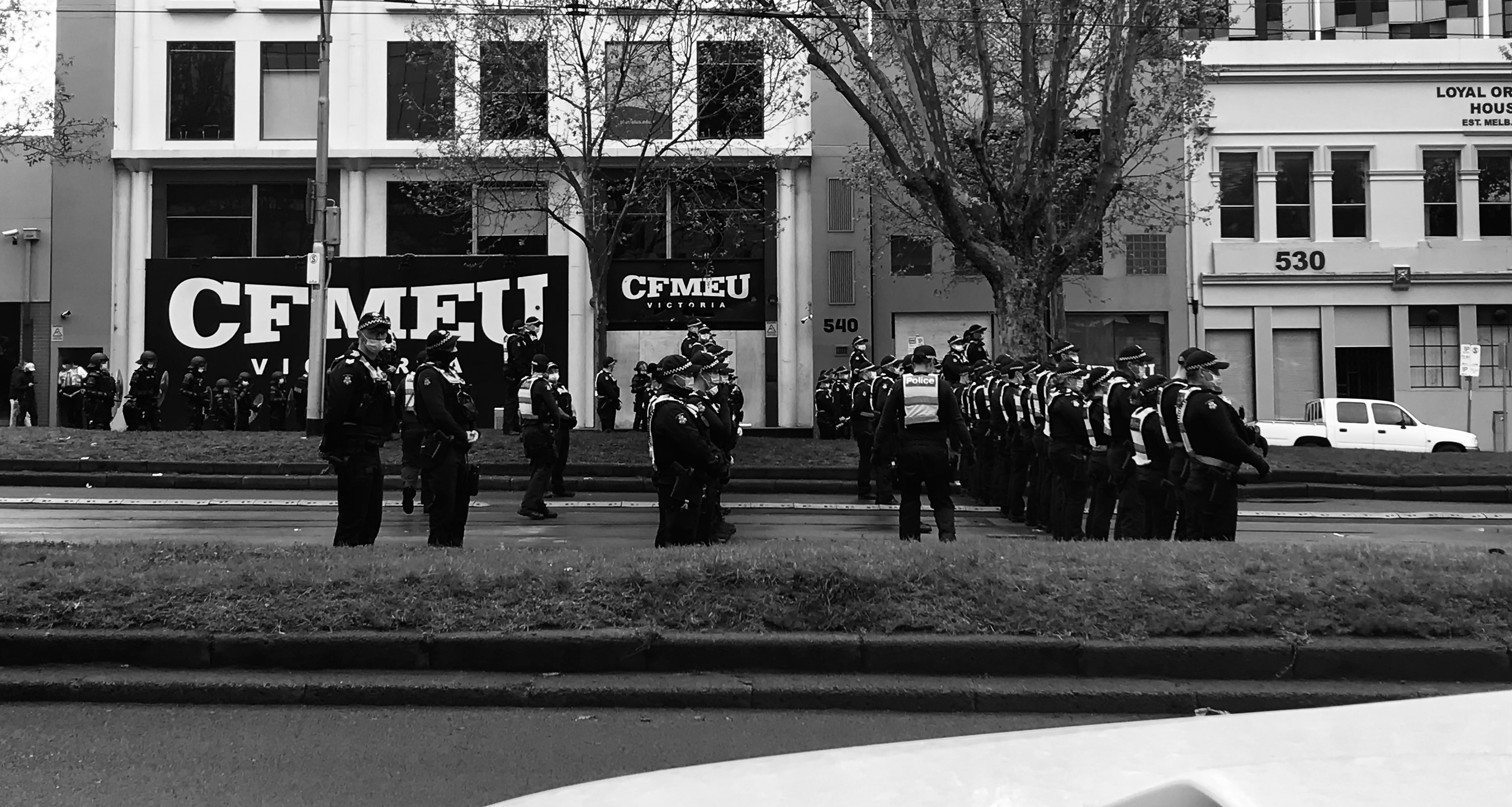
Police lines to guard the CFMEU headquarters on Elizabeth Street, 21st, September, 2021.

On 21 September in Melbourne, there was another large protest against a wide range of pandemic response related issues, including the previous days' construction industry shut down. The "Victorian Workers Rally For Freedom" march started near to the CFMEU headquarters at 10am, went through the CBD, past state Parliament, Flinders Street railway station, then onto and blocking the West Gate Freeway. At least one media reporter was assaulted and objects thrown at police. Riot police again used tear gas and rubber bullets. The construction shutdown could cost the industry nearly AU$500 million per day. There were 62 arrests related to the protest.

On 22 September in Melbourne city there was yet another protest with up to 1,000 people converging on the Shrine of Remembrance. After a stand-off for a few hours with police surrounding them, protesters dispersed at about 5pm. Two police officers were injured by thrown bottles and more than 200 people were arrested. An estimated 300 fines were issued for not complying with stay-at-home directives. The Shrine was left strewn with left behind garbage and its walls had been urinated on. At least one protester there was hospitalised by the next day with COVID-19.

On 23 September a strong police presence was seen in Melbourne at State Parliament, CFMEU offices, and the Shrine. 92 arrests were made as police checked that people were lawfully in the CBD in compliance with the current Chief Health Officers' directives. Some arrests were for outstanding warrants.

The protests, with verbal and physical abuse of their staff in public places on their way to work resulted in the closure, for at least four days, of a vaccination centre at Melbourne Town Hall, and also a drop-in clinic for the homeless near Queen Victoria Market.

On 24 and 25 September, there was again a strong presence of police in Melbourne to stop protesters gathering. More than 200 were arrested across the city on the 24th as police acted to prevent people assembling, and more than 90 arrests on the 25th in Melbourne and St Kilda.

==== October ====
On 2 October there was another street protest against mandatory vaccination requirements for authorised workers.

On 5 October Victoria reported 4 deaths. There were also 1,763 new cases, a state and national record high, surpassing the 1,599 record set in NSW on 10 September 2021.

- The daily new cases number had been over 1,000 for 6 days, raising the 7-day average to 1,340 cases
- active infections reached 14,368
  – over twice the peak of the 2020 'second wave'
- construction sites reopened at 25% capacity, after a 2-week shutdown
- 7 COVID cases were linked to a violent protest outside the CFMEU union headquarters on 20 September

On 8 October Victoria reported 5 deaths. There were also 1,838 new cases, a new state and national record high, again surpassing the 1,599 case record in NSW, and the states' own record set on 5 October.

The dead were:

- 2 men, 3 women
  - man in his 80s, City of Brimbank; in his 70s, City of Moreland
  - woman in her 80s from Whittlesea; in her 70s, Greater Shepparton; in her 70s, City of Knox
- active infections reached 16,823
- 620 were hospitalised, 114 in ICU, 76 on ventilation
- outbreak deaths rose to 75, and total state deaths to 895

Also on 8 October at 11:59 pm Mildura, a regional city in north-western Victoria, entered a 7-day lockdown.

On 14 October Victoria reported 11 deaths, raising state deaths to 945, of them 125 were during the states' delta outbreak. There were also 2,297 new cases, another state and national record high, surpassing the 1,838 record cases reported in Victoria on 8 October 2021. The dead included:

- 9 men, 2 women
  - 3 men, in their 50s, 60s and 70s, from Hume
  - man in his 50s from City of Moonee Valley
  - man in his 60s from Moreland
  - 2 men, 1 in his 60s, 1 his 70s, from Melton
  - man in his 80s from Brimbank
  - man in his 70s from Greater Shepparton
  - 2 woman, 1 in her 70s, 1 in her 80s, from Knox
- active infections reached 20,505
- 706 people were hospitalised, 147 in ICU (98% un-vaccinated), 100 on ventilation
- the 7-day average was then approximately 1,806 cases

On 16 October Victoria reported 7 deaths, raising state deaths to 957, of them 138 were during the states' delta outbreak. There were also 1,993 new cases, not a record, but still surpassing the 1,838 record cases reported in Victoria on 8 October 2021.
The people who died were:

- 3 men, 3 women, and a teenager
  - 1 in their 50s, 2 their 60s, 1 their 70s, 2 their 80s and,
    - a 15-year-old
      – with other health conditions
  - a man in his 50s from Hume
  - a woman in her 60s from Casey
  - a woman in her 60s from Darebin
  - a woman in her 70s from Whittlesea
  - a man in his 80s and from Darebin
  - a man in his 80s from City of Moonee Valley
- active infections reached 21,647, total cumulative cases reached 63,836
- 798 people were hospitalised, 163 in ICU (89.2% un-vaccinated), 106 on ventilation

==== November ====
On 15 November an inquest began into 50 deaths, 45 from COVID-19, that occurred in July and August 2020 at St Basil's Homes for the Aged, Fawkner, Melbourne. It was the deadliest COVID-19 outbreak in an aged care setting in Australia. On 28 November, the Omicron variant spread from southern Africa to Sydney and Darwin by aircraft, and would go on to become the dominant variant in Victoria by the end of the year.

==== December ====
On 2 December, Parliament passed the Public Health and Wellbeing Amendment (Pandemic Management) Bill, which had been the subject of heated protests since October.

On 23 December, Victoria had 8 deaths and 2,095 new cases.

On 24 December, the state reintroduced mandatory wearing of masks. With the exception of in private homes, masks must be worn indoors. Major events also required patrons to be masked while moving around, but not if seated outdoors.

On 30 December, there were 7 deaths raising the states' total to 1,525, and 5,919 new cases raising the total to over 176,000 since the pandemic began. There were over 28,000 active cases.

Also on 30 December a Big Bash League cricket match between the Melbourne Stars and the Perth Scorchers was cancelled after a positive case of COVID-19 among the players.

=== 2022 ===
On 5 January, 11 deaths were reported raising state deaths in the current outbreak to 731, and 17,636 new COVID-19 cases. There were 51,317 active cases.
Hospitalisations rose to 591, including 53 in intensive care units, and 20 patients being ventilated.

On 6 January, 6 deaths were reported raising total state deaths to 737, and a state record of 21,997 new COVID-19 cases. There were 61,120 active cases.
Hospitalisations rose to 631, including 51 in intensive care units, and 22 patients being ventilated.

On 8 January, 9 deaths were reported raising state outbreak deaths to 752, 1,574 in total. There were 51,356 new COVID-19 cases reported. State health authorities are now including positive rapid antigen test (RAT) results in new daily case numbers. 26,428 new (probable) cases were detected by rapid tests, 24,928 by PCR tests. There were 83,390 active cases.
Hospitalisations rose to 731, with 109 in intensive care units including 22 patients being ventilated.

On 9 January, 2 deaths were reported raising state outbreak deaths to 758, and 1,580 in total. There were 78,093 new COVID-19 cases reported. 17,190 new (probable) cases were detected by rapid tests, 17,618 by PCR tests.
There were 161,065 active cases.

On 10 January, there were 13 deaths, raising the outbreaks total to 771 and 1,593 total deaths since March 2020. There were 37,994 new cases. Of them, 18,503 probable cases were detected by RAT tests, and 19,491 by PCR from 59,670 tests. There were more than 171,000 active cases.
Hospitalisations rose to 861, a new Victorian record, including 117 in intensive care units, and 27 patients being ventilated. The previous high for hospital admissions was 851 on 18 October 2021.

On 11 January, 21 deaths were reported raising state outbreak deaths to 792, and 1,614 in total. There were 40,127 new COVID-19 cases reported. 18,314 new (probable) cases were detected by RAT tests, 21,693 by PCR tests.
There were 209,715 active cases.
Hospitalisations rose to 946, a new record, and 69 were in intensive care.

On 12 January, 25 deaths were reported raising state outbreak deaths to 817, and 1,639 in total. They were aged in their 60s, 70s, 80s, 90s, and 100s. 7 of the deaths were from December 2021.
There were 37,169 new COVID-19 cases reported. 16,843 new cases were reported as detected by RAT tests, 20,326 by PCR tests. 62,406 PCR tests were processed, raising the pandemic total to 18,201,482. There were 221,726 active cases.
Hospitalisations rose to 953, another Victorian record, including 111 in ICU (69 active cases and 42 cleared cases), and 29 patients being ventilated.
19.9 per cent of Victorians, or 1,046,192 people aged 18 and over have had three doses of a COVID-19 vaccine.

On 13 January, 18 deaths were reported raising state deaths to 1,657 in total. They were aged in their 30s, 50s, 60s, 70s, 80s, and 90s. 12 were from the 4 previous days, mostly the 2 previous days, and 6 of the deaths were from November or December 2021.
There were 34,836 new COVID-19 cases reported. 15,440 new cases were reported as detected by RAT tests, 19,396 by PCR tests. 62,445 PCR tests were processed, raising the pandemic total to 18,263,927. There were 239,396 active cases.
Hospitalisations rose to 976, another Victorian record, including 79 in ICU including 33 cleared cases and 30 ventilated.
21.2 per cent of Victorians aged 18 and over have had three doses of a COVID-19 vaccine.

On 14 January, 23 deaths were reported raising state deaths to 1,681 in total. They were aged in their 30s, 50s, 70s, 80s, and 90s. 17 deaths were from the 7 previous days, mostly the 2 prior days, and 6 of the deaths were from late 2021.
There were 25,526 new COVID-19 cases reported. 12,857 new cases were reported as detected by RAT tests, 12,669 by PCR tests. 59,952 PCR tests were processed, raising the pandemic total to 18,323,879. There were 227,105 active cases.
Hospitalisations rose to 1,054, another Victorian record, including 80 in ICU including 35 cleared cases and 30 ventilated.
22.4 per cent of Victorians aged 18 and over had three doses of a COVID-19 vaccine.

Also on 14 January, the state government announced that it would be creating two "medi-hotels", with over 300 bed capacity, beginning 17 January. This is intended to reduce pressure on the states' hospital system by freeing beds for higher need patients.

On 15 January, 13 deaths were reported raising state deaths to 1,691 in total.
There were 28,128 new COVID-19 cases reported. 10,337 were reported as detected by RAT tests, and 17,791 by PCR tests. Total COVID cases reached 462,488. 59,031 PCR tests were processed, raising the pandemic test total to 18,382,910. There were 237,559 active cases.
Hospitalisations rose to 1,114, including 122 in ICU and 35 of those ventilated.
~23 % of Victorians aged 18 and over had three doses of a COVID-19 vaccine.

On 16 January, 6 deaths were reported raising state deaths to 1,696 in total. There were 22,429 new COVID-19 cases reported. 10,370 were reported as detected by RAT tests, and 12,059 by PCR tests. Total COVID cases reached 475,605. 49,698 PCR test results were received, raising the pandemic test total to 18,3432,608. There were 245,040 active cases.
Hospitalisations rose to 1,229, a record high, including 129 in ICU and 38 of those ventilated.

On 17 January, 22 deaths were reported raising state deaths to 1,718 in total. They were aged in their 50s, 60s, 70s, 80s and 90s. 11 of the deaths were reported as occurring "... in the last two days".
There were 20,180 new COVID-19 cases reported. 11,747 were reported as detected by RAT tests, and 8,433 by PCR tests. Some RATs were performed up to 5 days previously. Total COVID cases reached 475,474 (from PCR tests). 39,725 PCR test results were received, raising the pandemic PCR test total to 18,472,333. There were 235,035 active cases.
Hospitalisations fell to 1,152, including 93 in ICU, including 34 cleared cases, and 43 of those ventilated.

On 18 January, 18 deaths were reported raising state deaths to 1,737 in total. They were aged in their 50s, 60s, 70s, 80s and 90s. There were 20,769 new COVID-19 cases reported. 10,043 were reported as detected by RAT tests, and 10,725 by PCR tests. Some RATs were performed up to 5 days previously. 49,838 PCR test results were received, raising the pandemic PCR test total to 18,522,171. There was an increase in active cases from 235,035 to 253,827.
Hospitalisations rose to 1,173, with 93 in ICU (including 32 cleared cases) and 42 of those ventilated.

==== Code brown ====
Also on 18 January, the state declared a 'Code Brown' emergency, effective from mid-day on 19 January 2022. It applied to all hospitals in Melbourne, and 6 regional hospitals. This declaration was intended to allow additional capacity to receive a possible surge of admissions. A Code Brown is more commonly used for emergencies such as incidents causing mass casualties and natural disasters.

On 19 January, 15 deaths were reported raising state deaths to 1,751 in total. They were aged in their 50s, 60s, 70s, 80s and 90s. There were 21,966 new COVID-19 cases reported. 10,273 were reported as detected by RAT tests, and 11,693 by PCR tests. Some RATs were performed up to 5 days previously. 51,067 PCR test results were received, raising the pandemic PCR test total to 18,573,238.. There was a fall in active cases from 253,827 to 246,894.
Hospitalisations rose to 1,206, with 86 in ICU (including 40 cleared cases) and 36 of those ventilated.

On 20 January, 20 deaths were reported raising state deaths to 1,771 in total. They were aged in their 50s, 70s, 80s, 90s and 100s. There were 18,167 new COVID-19 cases reported. 8,144 were reported as detected by RAT tests, and 10,023 by PCR tests. 43,119 PCR test results were received, raising the pandemic PCR test total to 18,616,357. There was a rise in active cases from 246,894 to 252,399.
Hospitalisations fell from 1,206 to 1,096, with 87 in ICU (including 34 cleared cases) and 34 of those ventilated.

On 21 January, another 20 deaths were reported raising state deaths to 1,791 in total. They were aged in their 50s, 60s, 70s, 80s, and 90s. There were 16,016 new COVID-19 cases reported. 7,584 were reported as detected by RAT tests, and 8,432 by PCR tests. 39,179 PCR test results were received, raising the pandemic PCR test total to 18,655,536. There was a fall in active cases from 252,399 to 217,505.
Hospitalisations fell from 1,096 to 1,029 with 83 in ICU (including 37 cleared cases) and 39 of those ventilated.

On 22 January, 14 deaths were reported raising state deaths to 1,805 in total. They were aged in their 30s, 50s, 60s, 70s, 80s, and 90s. There were 13,091 new COVID-19 cases reported. 6,466 were reported as detected by RAT tests, and 6,625 by PCR tests. 32,435 PCR tests were processed, raising the pandemic PCR test total to 18,687,971. There was a fall in active cases from 217,505 to 191,058.
Hospitalisations fell from 1,029 to 1,002, with 84 in ICU (including 36 cleared cases) and 44 of those ventilated.

On 23 January, 17 deaths were reported raising state deaths to 1,822 in total. They were aged in their 70s, 80s, and 90s. There were 11,695 new COVID-19 cases reported. 7,207 were reported as detected by RAT tests, and 4,488 by PCR tests. 21,975 PCR tests were processed, raising the pandemic PCR test total to 18,709,646. There was a fall in active cases from 191,058 to 186,073.
Hospitalisations fell from 1,002 to 998, with 87 in ICU (plus 32 cleared cases) and 47 of those ventilated.

On 24 January, 29 deaths were reported raising state deaths to 1,850 in total. They were aged in their 30s, 70s, 80s, and 90s. There were 14,836 new COVID-19 cases reported. 8,539 were reported as detected by RAT tests, and 6,297 by PCR tests. Total COVID cases reached 564,216 (from PCR tests). 30,726 PCR tests were processed, raising the pandemic PCR test total to 18,740,372. There was a fall in active cases from 186,073 to 183,154.
Hospitalisations rose from 988 to 1,057 with, fell to 82 in ICU (plus 37 cleared cases), and 47 of those ventilated.

On 25 January, 35 deaths were reported raising state deaths to 1,885 in total. They were aged in their 40s, 50s, 70s, 80s, and 90s. There were 13,507 new COVID-19 cases reported. 6,974 were reported as detected by RAT tests, and 6,533 by PCR tests. 34,835 PCR tests were processed, raising the pandemic PCR test total to 18,775,207. There was a fall in active cases from 183,154 to 139,562.
Hospitalisations rose from 1,057 to 1,089 with, fell to 77 in ICU (plus 36 cleared cases), and 40 of those ventilated.

On 26 January, 15 deaths were reported raising state deaths to 1,900 in total. They were aged in their 50s, 70s, 80s, 90s and 100s. There were 13,755 new COVID-19 cases reported. 7,625 were reported as detected by RAT tests, and 6,130 by PCR tests. 31,218 PCR tests were processed, raising the pandemic PCR test total to 18,806,425. There was a fall in active cases from 139,562 to 119,153.
Hospitalisations fell from 1,089 back to 1,057, stayed at 77 in ICU (plus 40 cleared cases) and 40 of those ventilated.

On 27 January, 39 deaths were reported raising state deaths to 1,939 in total. They were aged in their 30s, 60s, 70s, 80s, and 90s. There were 12,755 new COVID-19 cases reported. 7,410 were reported as detected by RAT tests, and 5,345 by PCR tests. 24,467 PCR tests were processed, raising the pandemic PCR test total to 18,830,892. There was a fall in active cases from 119,153 to 101,605.
Hospitalisations fell from 1,057 to 988, stayed at 77 in ICU (plus 37 cleared cases) and unchanged at 40 of those ventilated.

On 28 January, 31 deaths were reported raising state deaths to 1,970 in total. They were aged in their 40s to 100s. There were 12,250 new COVID-19 cases reported. 6,006 were reported as detected by RAT tests, and 6,244 by PCR tests. 31,422 PCR tests were processed, raising the pandemic PCR test total to 18,862,314. There was a fall in active cases from 101,605 to 79,836.
Hospitalisations fell from 988 to 953, down to 76 in ICU (plus 38 cleared cases) and 39 of those ventilated.

On 29 January, 20 deaths were reported raising state deaths to 1,988 in total. They were aged in their 40s to 100s. There were 10,589 new COVID-19 cases reported. 6,110 were reported as detected by RAT tests, and 4,479 by PCR tests. 25,172 PCR tests were processed, raising the pandemic PCR test total to 18,887,486. There was a fall in active cases from 79,836 to 78,294.
Hospitalisations fell from 953 to 889, down to 69 in ICU (plus 42 cleared cases) and 35 of those ventilated.

On 31 January, 35 deaths were reported, raising state deaths to 2,029 in total.

On 12 October, at 11:59pm, Victoria's COVID-19 pandemic declaration ended after 903 days.

=== 2024 ===
On 27 November 2024, a health alert was issued, with an increase in hospitalisations to 194, up by 12% in the last week, and an increase of lab-confirmed cases in the last week to 1,597, a 10% increase over the last week and 63% increase over the last month. The alert recommended staying home if sick, taking a test if having symptoms, staying up to date with vaccines and boosters, and wearing a mask if visiting sensitive settings such as hospitals, healthcare, aged care, disability care, and Indigenous Australian health services.

=== 2025 ===
The Australian Bureau of Statistics (ABS) reported that COVID-19 remained the leading cause of death in the category of acute respiratory infections. Although the number of cases increased between November 2024 and January 2025, the ABS counted fewer cases compared to earlier years. At the same time, COVID-19 cases remain higher among Indigenous populations compared to non-Indigenous population.

== Impacts ==
=== Arts and culture ===
Many exhibitions, festivals and other events were cancelled, postponed or reduced in size due to restrictions on public gatherings and health concerns. This caused a significant reduction in the numbers of people engaging in arts and cultural activities in Victoria, dropping to a low of 23% in November 2021.

In turn, many artists and others employed in creative industries became unemployed. In April 2020, only 47% of the arts and culture sector remained in operation. While some economic assistance was provided by governments, their eligibility requirements excluded over 193,000 of these workers.

Hundreds of events were affected including:

- The 2020 annual Melbourne Food and Wine Festival (due to start in March 2020) was postponed to Spring.
- The 2020 Melbourne International Comedy Festival (scheduled for 25 March – 19 April 2020) was cancelled due to banned public gatherings of more than 500 people.
- The 2020 Melbourne International Jazz Festival (scheduled for 29 May – 12 June) was cancelled; however, it was replaced by a virtual online event by These Digital Times.
- The inaugural Rising Festival was postponed in 2020, in 2021 a snap lockdown started at midnight on 27 May, the second day of the festival, and was then extended a week. The remainder of the Festivals' already reduced programme was cancelled. The Victorian Government funded Rising to replace the Melbourne International Arts Festival and White Night.
- The 2020 and 2021 annual Royal Melbourne Show (due to start in mid-September) were cancelled.
- The 2020 annual Royal Geelong Show (scheduled for October) was cancelled.
- The 2020 Golden Plains Festival avoided the national lockdown imposed soon after it ran in March, but in December 2020 the 2021 festival was cancelled.
- Melbourne's New Year's Eve fireworks at the end of 2020 were cancelled.
- The 2021 Rainbow Serpent Festival, normally held on the Australia Day long weekend in Lexton, had its physical events cancelled. The Festival was instead to be replaced by a streaming event.
- Melbourne's 2021 Moomba Festival was cancelled for the first time. However within a week "Moomba 2.0" had been created. In place of the normal Moomba attractions, Lord Mayor Sally Capp said Moomba 2.0 will be: "... a series of fun, family friendly events and attractions across the city that will help bring the buzz back to Melbourne."
- The 2020 Melbourne International Flower & Garden Show (scheduled for 25–29 March 2020) was cancelled.
- The 2020 and 2021 PAX Australia (scheduled for October) were cancelled. PAX Online, taking place virtually, replaced PAX Australia both years.

=== Economics ===
The Pandemic had the biggest impact on Victoria's state economy out of all states and territories of Australia. Its Gross State Product (GSP) fell for the 2019-2020 and 2020-2021 Financial Years - the first time in 30 years that the state economy contracted. The cumulative economic loss over the course of the Pandemic up to December 2022 was estimated to be $69.5 billion.

=== Education ===
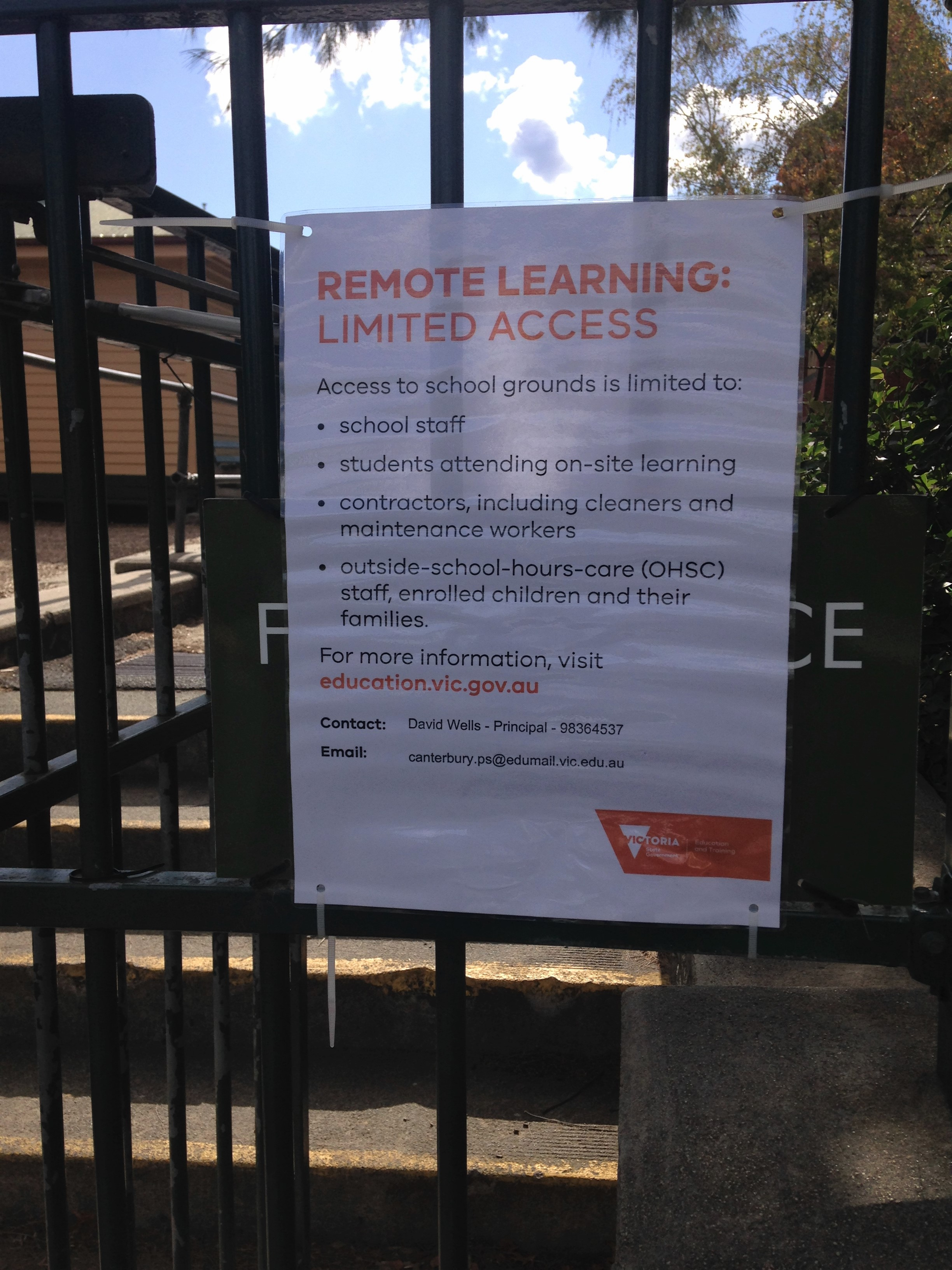
Sign outside a school in Melbourne restricting access to school grounds during a lockdown period.

Schools, universities and other educational institutions were heavily impacted. Classroom attendance was replaced with virtual or 'remote learning' across Victoria for much of 2020, 2021 and 2022. When some in-person teaching resumed between lockdown periods, facilities operated within statewide regulations that, at various times, restricted the numbers of students and staff, mandated masks and vaccination requirements. Most of these restrictions were removed by the end of 2022.

Subsequent research has found the mental and physical health impacts on these events on children and teaching staff in Victoria in particular, given the length and extent of lockdowns. These include increased rates of anxiety and depression, anti-social behaviour, and perceived stress.

=== Event cancellations ===
- The 2020 Australian Grand Prix (scheduled for 15 March) was cancelled.
- The 2021 Australian Grand Prix was postponed, then later cancelled on 6 July 2021.
- The 2021 Australian MotoGP at Phillip Island was cancelled on 6 July 2021.
- The 2021 VFL finals series was cancelled on 1 September 2021, with no premiership awarded.
- The 2021 VFL Women's Grand Final was initially postponed and then cancelled on 10 September 2021, with no premiership awarded.

== Lockdown statistics ==
Melbourne had six lockdowns, totalling 262 days:

- Lockdown 1: March 26 to May 12, 2020 – 43 days
- Lockdown 2: July 8 to October 27, 2020 – 111 days
- Lockdown 3: February 12 to February 17, 2021 – 5 days
- Lockdown 4: May 27 to June 10, 2021 – 14 days
- Lockdown 5: July 15 to July 27, 2021 – 12 days
- Lockdown 6: August 5 to October 21, 2021 – 77 days

There were approximately 186 days of remote learning for school students in Melbourne.

== Statistics ==
COVID-19 cumulative cases in Victoria

View source data.

COVID-19 daily cases in Victoria

View source data.

== See also ==
- Timeline of the COVID-19 pandemic in Australia
- COVID-19 pandemic in Australia
- COVID-19 pandemic
