= Funfair (disambiguation) =

A fair is a gathering of people for a variety of entertainment or commercial activities.

Funfair may also refer to:

- Amusement park
- Midway (fair)
- Sideshow alley (in Australia)
- Traveling carnival (US English)
- Travelling funfair (British English)
- Volksfest (in Germany)

== Music ==
- "Funfair" (song), written for the 1968 musical film Chitty Chitty Bang Bang
- Funfair (Nobukazu Takemura album), released in 1999
- Funfair (Rip Slyme album), released in 2007
- Fun Fair, by MC Cheung from This is MC, released in 2023

== Other uses ==
- Funfair (horse), winner of the 2012 Colleen Stakes

== See also ==
- Fair (disambiguation)
- Fairground (disambiguation)
- Fun Fare (disambiguation)
