= Ballarat Show =

- Observed by: People from Ballarat area
- Type: Local
- Celebrations: Agricultural displays, sideshows, fashion parades
- Date: Second weekend of November
- Frequency: Annual

The Ballarat Show is an annual event held at the Ballarat Showgrounds run by the Ballarat Agricultural and Pastoral Society.

Established in 1887, the Ballarat Show is principally an agricultural event which focuses on the primary industries of Victoria, and rural lifestyle of many Tasmanians with events such as livestock judging, equestrian events, animal breeders competitions, produce competitions and wood chopping, although it also incorporates live entertainment, sporting events, food tasting, and fashion shows. A popular feature of the show is the sideshows which feature showrides, foodstalls, games of skill, and showbag stalls.

The show runs for three days, Friday through to Sunday, ending on the second Saturday in October. The Friday is a public holiday in the City of Ballarat, Hepburn Shire and selected regions in the Golden Plains Shire, known as Show Day. The Saturday is known as family day and usually involves many discounts and savings on showbags and rides from the other days.

Like its southern counterpart, the Royal Melbourne Show, over recent years the event has shifted towards more of a carnival atmosphere than its previously more agrarian focus.

In 2020 and 2021 the Show was cancelled due to the COVID-19 pandemic. The 2021 show is scheduled for 12 to 14 November.
