= Robert Day (cartoonist) =

American cartoonist

- Born: September 25, 1900 San Bernardino, California, U.S.
- Died: February 7, 1985 (aged 84) Gravette, Arkansas
- Areas: Cartoonist, Illustrator
- Notable works: Fun Fare; a Treasury of Reader's Digest Wit and Humor; The New Yorker cartoonist
- Spouse: Ethel Fabian

Robert James Day (September 25, 1900 – February 7, 1985) was an American cartoonist and book illustrator.

Day studied at the Otis Art Institute in Los Angeles between 1919 and 1927, while also on staff at the Los Angeles Times.

Day was a long-time contributor to The New Yorker, with his work appearing from September 1931 to May 24, 1976, including eight covers. According to Kirkus Reviews, he specialized in satirizing "[the] so-called athletic pursuits, [and also] the foibles of war and peace." His All Out for the Sack Race (Random House, 1945) collected many of his New Yorker cartoons.

Day illustrated Fun Fare; a Treasury of Reader's Digest Wit and Humor. The original 1949 edition was published by Reader's Digest in collaboration with Bob Hope. The original edition of Fun Fare comprised 300 pages of short comic stories illustrated in color by Day. The book was still one of the best-selling general titles three years later in 1952.

== Bibliography ==
As illustrator, unless otherwise noted

- All Out for the Sack Race (Random House, 1945) — Day's New Yorker cartoons
- (written by Hildegarde Dolson) We Shook the Family Tree: A Bumper Crop of Fun (1946)
- Fun Fare; a Treasury of Reader's Digest Wit and Humor (Reader's Digest, 1949) — selected in collaboration with Bob Hope. Cover illustration signed Robt Day
- (written by Arthur Godfrey) Stories I Like to Tell (Simon & Schuster, 1952)
- (written by Leo Rosten) Rome Wasn't Burned in a Day: The Mischief of Language (Doubleday, 1972)
