= Wittingslow Amusements =

Australian traveling carnival

Wittingslow Amusements was an Australian traveling carnival.

Founder Thomas George Wittingslow made his start during the Great Depression in the early 1930s. After a brief apprenticeship at a city fun parlour, Thomas went out on his own in 1932, working small shows and fairs in country Victoria. Returning to Melbourne for his first Royal Melbourne Show, Thomas began what was to become a lifelong association.

After six years of war service, Thomas returned to the industry in 1946 and with son Des began working fairs in large provincial towns. They ventured into the first amusement rides at the Royal Melbourne Show, when merry-go-rounds or carousels were popular after years of war-time austerity. The Melbourne Moomba Festival of 1948 saw Wittingslow present the first new generation "thrill" rides. Over the next 30 years, the Wittingslow family business grew steadily with three generations playing an active role.

In 1982 Tom Wittingslow formed a partnership with Terry Cartlidge and engineer and owner of CAMAC Ride manufacturing. This led to ventures into new ride designs and construction led to successful projects, such as the Sea World Corkscrew rollercoaster on Queensland's Gold Coast and many other thrill rides. Disagreements between the parties led to the dissolving of this partnership in 1986. CAMAC went onto building other notable rides such as the Lethal Weapon rollercoaster and other rides throughout Southeast Asia.

The Wittingslow Carnival operated at all major agricultural shows, including Melbourne, Sydney, Brisbane and Adelaide, and many street festivals in Melbourne. Since the 1950s, Wittingslow rides have also operated at the Rye and Rosebud Christmas Carnivals on the Mornington Peninsula.

The Wittingslow operation went into receivership in 2001 ending an era for Australia's east coast agricultural shows. Since going into receivership, Wittingslow has returned, and is now trading as Amusements Australia.
