= Martin & Reid =

British publisher

Martin & Reid of Bishopsgate were a British publisher of the 1940s. They produced children's comics such as Jolly Chuckles, Merry-go-round and Fun Fare (1946).

== Titles ==
- The Mascot - All Sport Boys Magazine 1950s
