= Fun Fare; a Treasury of Reader's Digest Wit and Humor =

Fun Fare
- 1949 first edition
- Illustrator: Robert Day (cartoonist)
- Language: English
- Genre: Non-fiction, humour
- Publisher: Reader's Digest
- Publication date: 1949
- Publication place: United States
- Pages: 300

Fun Fare; a Treasury of Reader's Digest Wit and Humor is a best-selling publication of Reader's Digest. The original 1949 edition was produced in collaboration with Bob Hope. The original edition of Fun Fare comprised 300 pages of short comic stories illustrated in color by cartoonist Robert James Day, signed on the cover as "Robt Day". The book was still one of the best selling general titles three years later in 1952.
