= Melbourne Royal Show =

Annual agricultural show in Melbourne, Australia

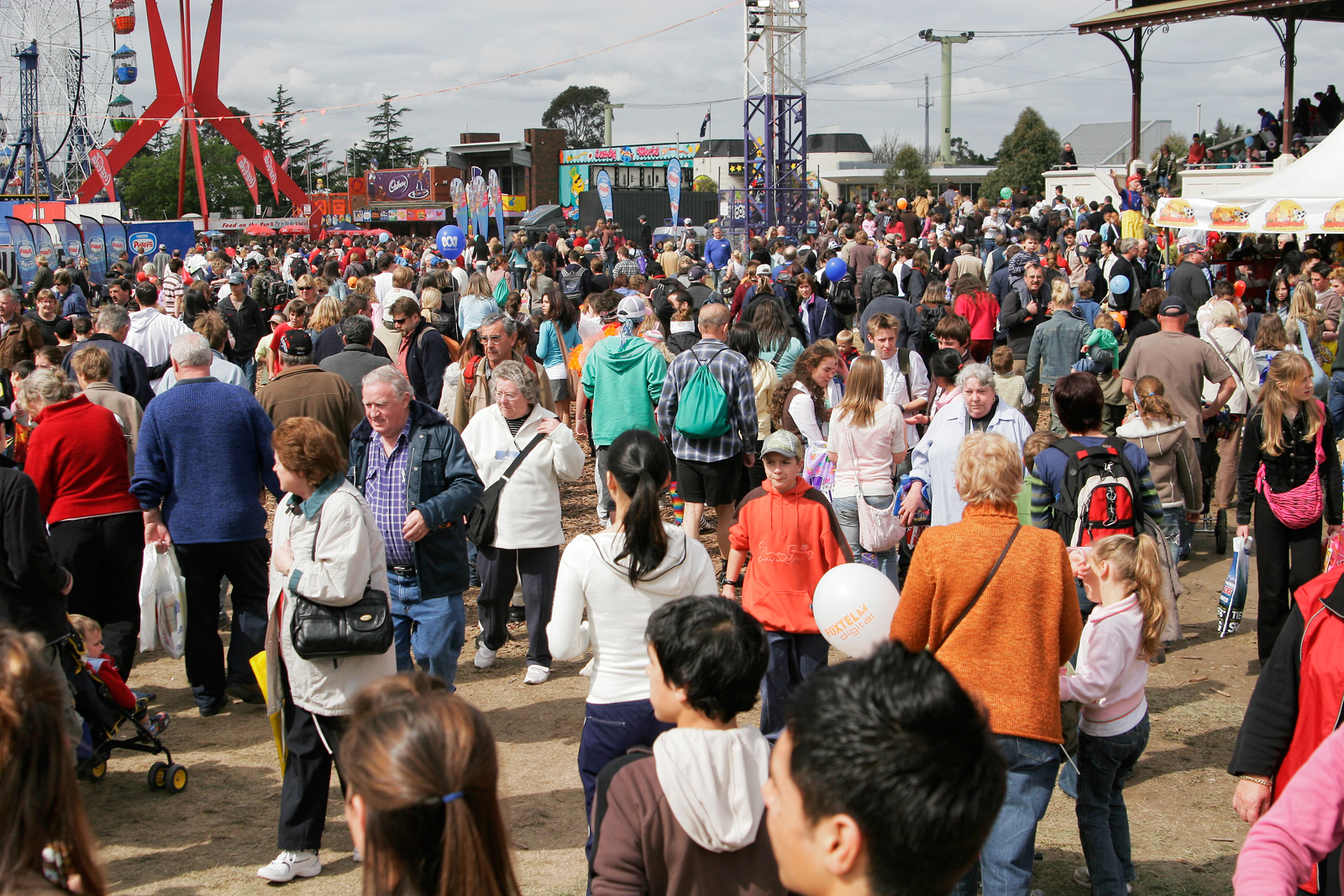
- Crowds at the Melbourne Royal Show
- Genre: Agricultural show
- Begins: Late September
- Ends: Early October
- Frequency: Annual
- Locations: Melbourne Showgrounds. Ascot Vale, Victoria, Australia
- Years active: 178
- Inaugurated: 1848
- Most recent: 25 September - 5 October 2025
- Next event: 24 September - 4 October 2026
- Attendance: 500,000 (2010)
- Organiser: Royal Agricultural Society of Victoria
- Website: royalshow.com.au

The Melbourne Royal Show (known until 2022 as the Royal Melbourne Show) is an agricultural show held at Melbourne Showgrounds every September. It is organised by Melbourne Royal (formally the Royal Agricultural Society of Victoria) and has been running since 1848. Each year Melbourne Royal Show attracts attendances of up to half a million people.

== About ==
The traditional purpose is the display of rural industry, including livestock and produce with its associated competitions and awards however the show also features amusement rides and a sideshow alley, as well as the Australian tradition of 'showbags', carry bags containing samples of products produced by various commercial enterprises.

A prominent feature during showtime are the many rides including a permanent wooden Mad Mouse roller coaster which resided at the grounds until 2001, owned by Wittingslow Amusements. A permanent chairlift also resided onsite until 2005. The site has its own railway station, used during special events located on the Flemington Racecourse line. The Thursday of the show was once observed as the Show Day public holiday in Melbourne; this holiday was abandoned in 1994.

While the Royal Show is the main show in Victoria, many cities and towns in regional Victoria host smaller shows, such as the Royal Geelong Show, Bendigo Show, Ballarat Show, Warragul Show, Whittlesea Show and the Shepparton Show.

== History ==
The show was founded in 1848. There was no show in 1915 to 1918 and 1940 to 1945 when the showgrounds were requisitioned for military use during WWI and WWII. In 2020 and 2021 the show was cancelled due to social distancing measures and mass gathering restrictions during the COVID-19 pandemic. In 2022, the Royal Melbourne Show was rebranded to Melbourne Royal Show.

== Displays ==
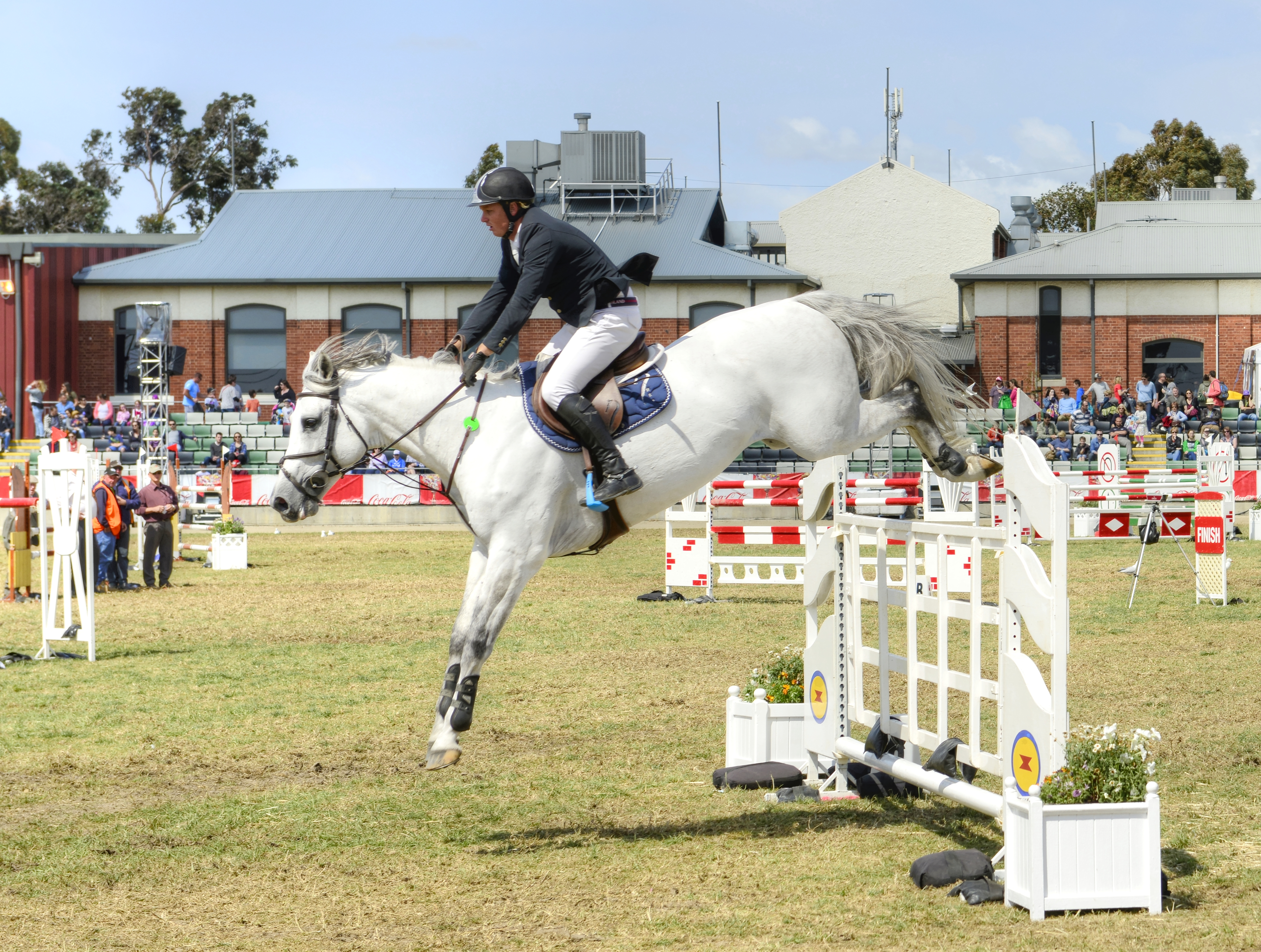
Equestrian Competition.

=== Competitions ===
The major rural competitions of the Melbourne Royal® Show include the:

- Melbourne Royal Alpaca Competition
- Melbourne Royal Beef Cattle Competition
- Melbourne Royal Beef Carcase Competition
- Melbourne Royal Dairy cattle Competition
- Melbourne Royal All Breeds Dog Competition
- Melbourne Royal Horses in Action Competition
- Melbourne Royal Poultry Competition
- Melbourne Royal Sheep Competition,
- Melbourne Royal Fleece Competition
- Melbourne Royal Art, Craft & Cookery Competition
- Melbourne Royal Woodchop Championships.

The major equestrienne competition of Australia is the Garryowen Equestrienne Turnout which is held here. This is a memorial trophy to Mrs Violet Murrell's bravery in attempting to save her horse, Garryowen from a fire. The competition is judged on mount, costume, saddlery, riding ability and general appearances of horsewomen.

There are also Art, Craft and Cookery Competitions.

=== Pavilions ===
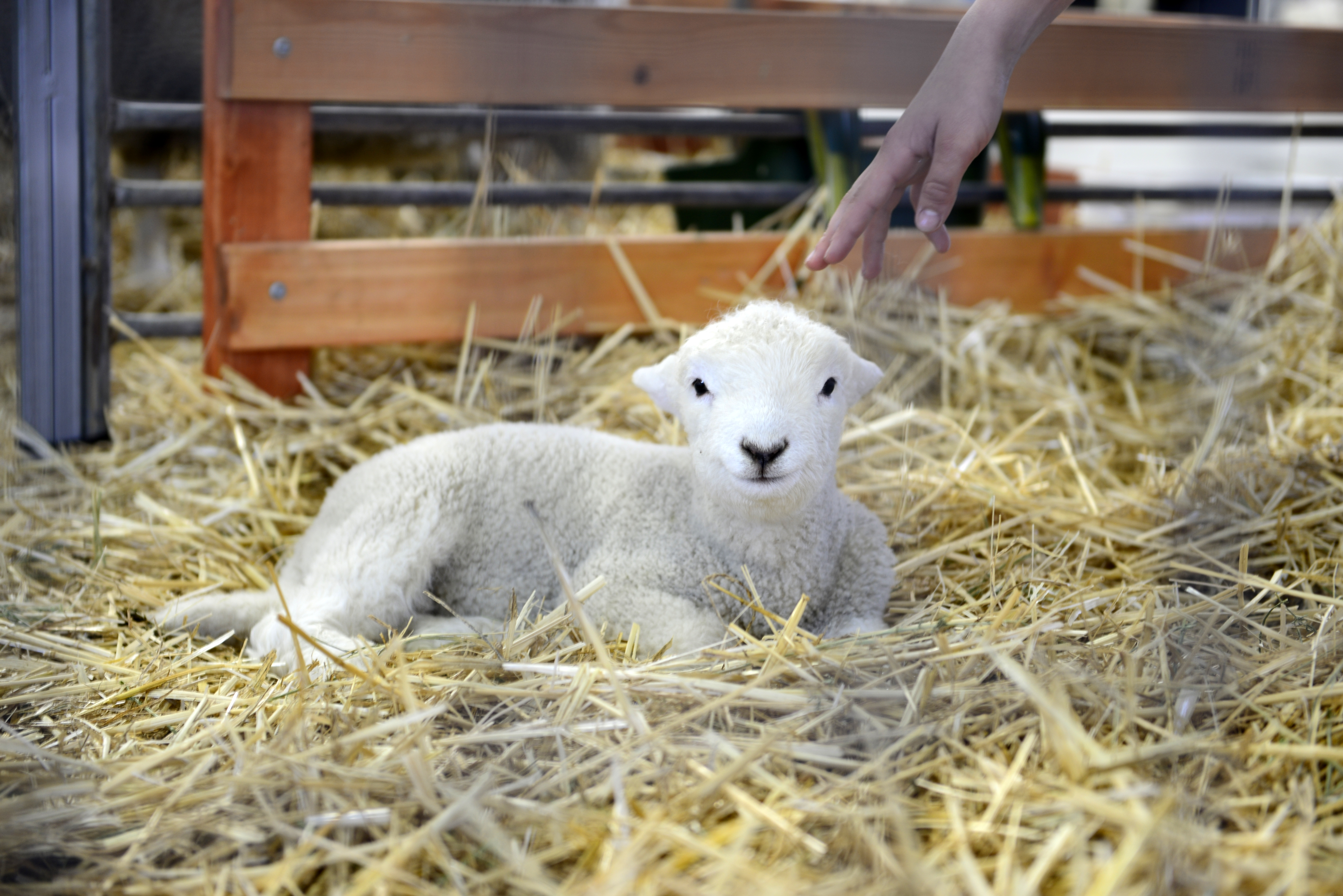
A lamb in the petting area at the 2013 show

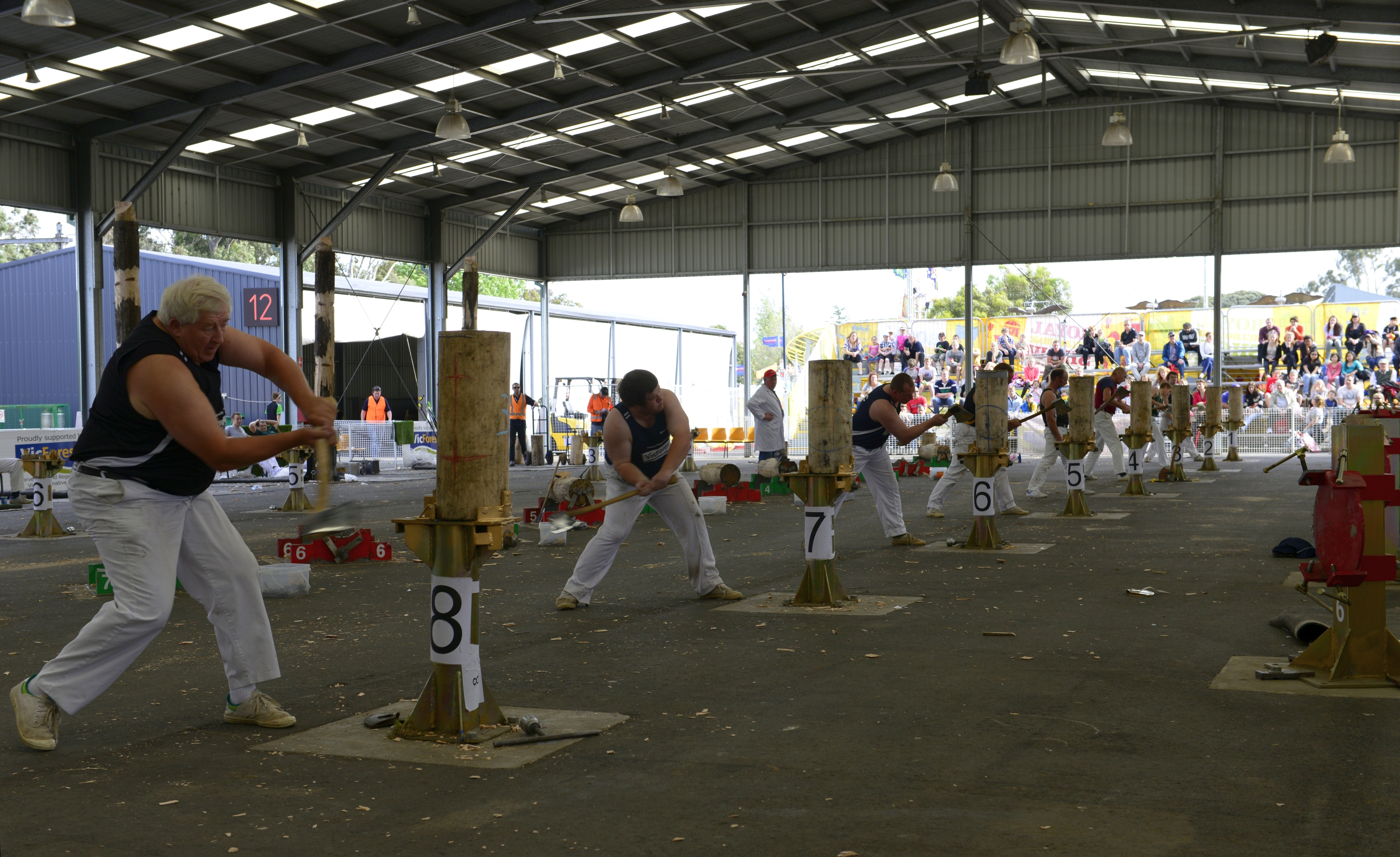
Wood chopping contest

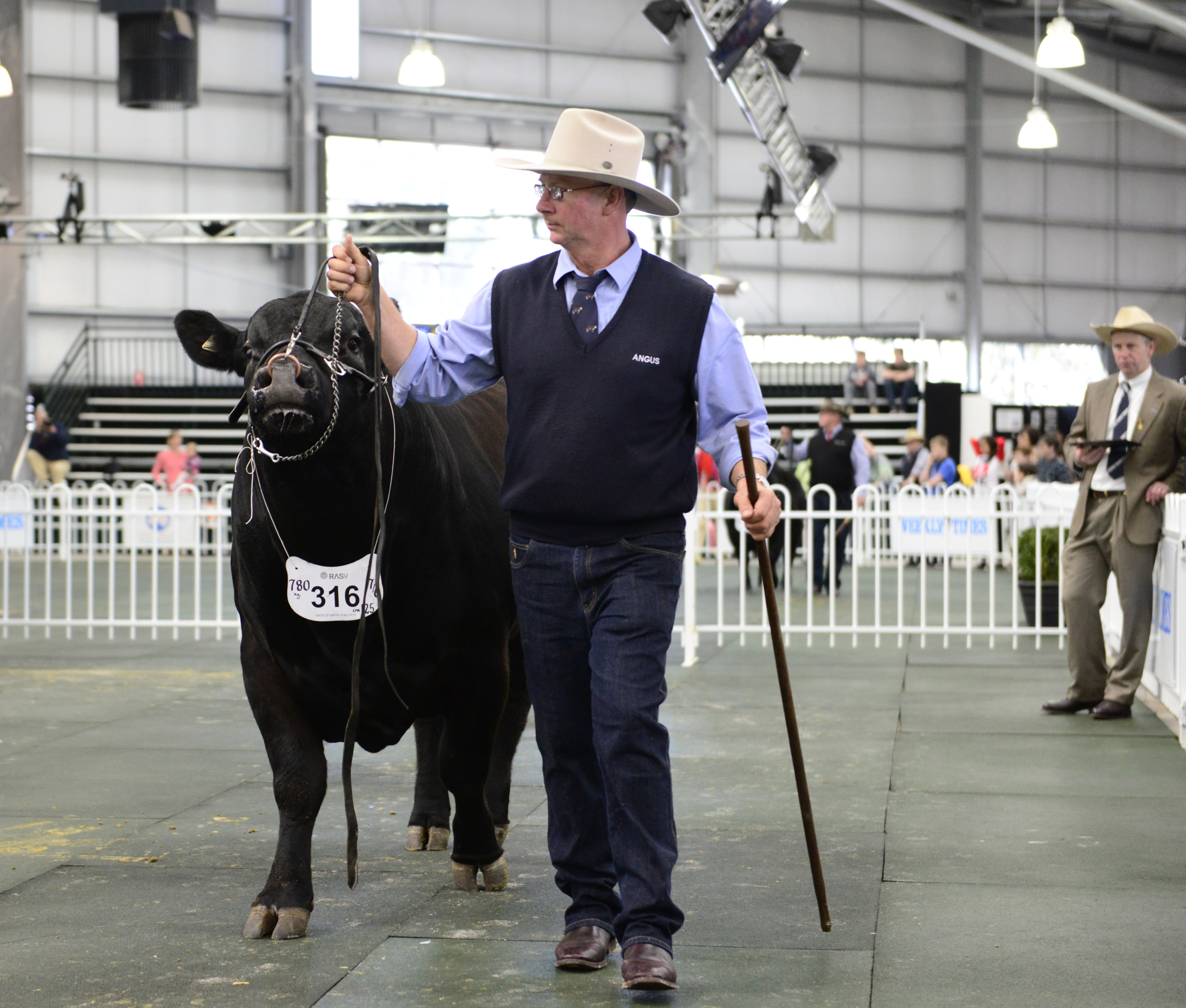
Cows on show

Located all around the Showgrounds are a total of sixteen pavilions and arenas. These include:-

- The Grand Pavilion is the primary site for showbags. It is also the home of large food hall, 'Eat Street'.
- The Grand Boulevard is a boulevard with selected themed commercial sites scattered along the spine sweeps across the full length of the site.
- The Entertainment Dome was a roofed attraction that replaced the "Herald Sun Town Centre" in 2012. An entertainment venue with food stalls, a major stage (designed for major events/shows), and also a smaller stage for music acts. In 2012 it hosted the My Kitchen Rules live show. In 2016, the Entertainment Dome was replaced by the open Town Square, which featured a full performance stage, a high-dive act, seating, shading, food operators and large screens.
- The Main Arena is a 9,000 square metre open air arena where crowds can watch the special events and entertainment.
- The 9News Lifestyle & Local Heroes Pavilion held in Victoria Pavilion, which includes educational displays for children, Channel 9 activations and various retail outlets.
- The Animal Nursery has baby animals.
- The Farmhouse is an interactive animal space including shearing and milking demonstrations and activities including pat-a-chook, pat-a-pig, grinding grains and digging for veggies.
- The Woodchop Pavilion has woodchopping competitions during the day attracting competitors from Australia and around the world.
- The Livestock Pavilion. is a huge pavilion where visitors can see animals or watch what's happening on the judging rings.
- The Art, Craft & Cookery Pavilion is full of crafts such as knitting, crochet, decorated cakes, clothing, leather goods, cookery, homemade jewellery and glass decorations. In 2017 it was changed to the Spotlight Makers Pavilion.
- The Dog Pavilion: Over the course of the Melbourne Royal Show thousands of dogs are judged to find the Best in Show.

== Educational ==
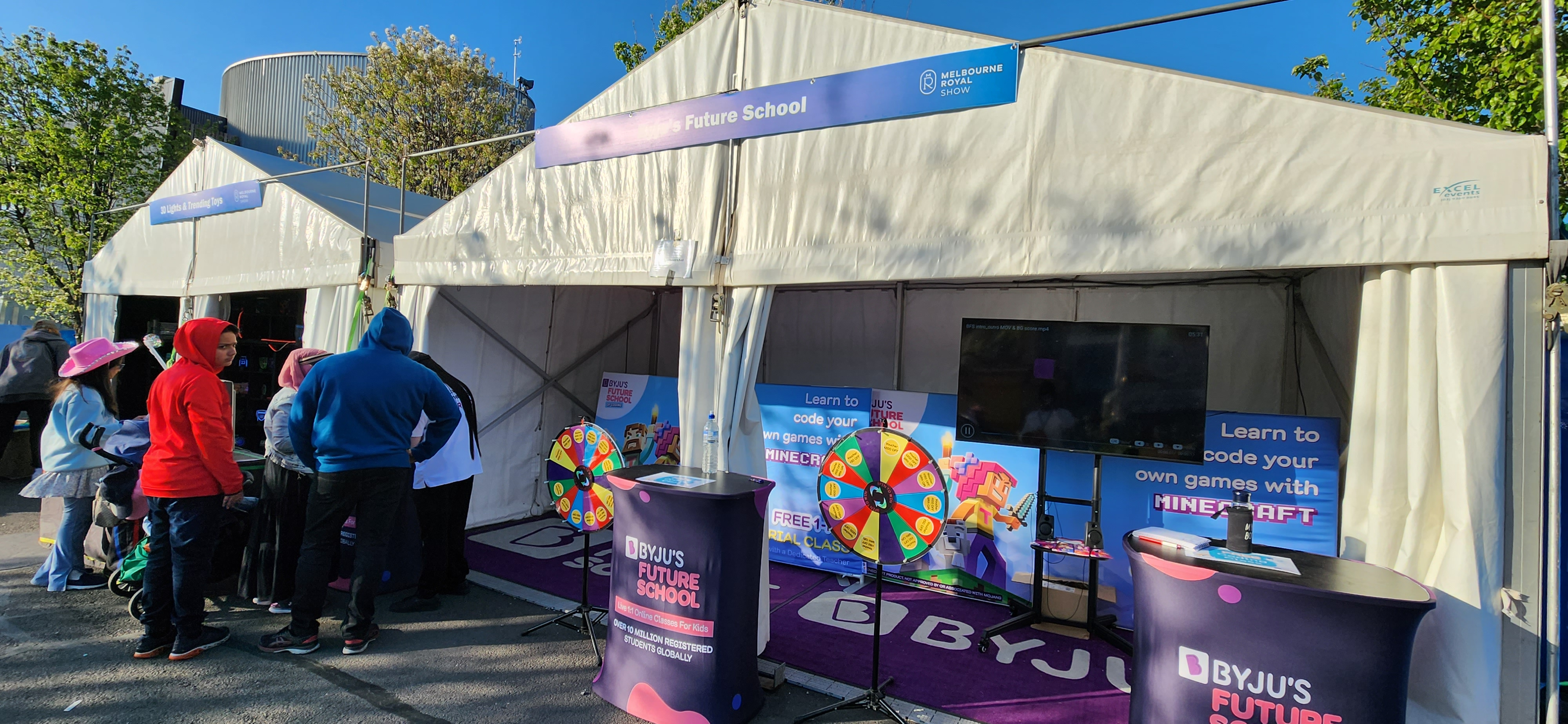
Byjus Future School at Melbourne Royal Show

There are a number of other services which is displayed in the Melbourne Royal Show this year in 2022. Australian Firefighters Calendar stall displayed calendars for 2022 and 2023 as a part of fundraising initiative for firefighters of Australia. Online Education Service provider - Byju's Future School also displayed a stall in this year's show which attracted parents and children from a diverse background motivating them to take online classes.

== Entertainment ==
Entertainment consists of multiple live performances, activities and displays. Entertainers have included Mickey and Minnie Mouse, Peppa Pig, Dorothy the Dinosaur from the children's group The Wiggles, Play School and Hi-5 concert, Sampson the Monster truck, clowns, caricature artists and many more. In addition to 774 ABC Melbourne radio outside broadcast. There is a nightly fireworks display and live performances. Lights, colours and sound provide a unique atmosphere in the Carnival precinct at night.

=== Rides ===
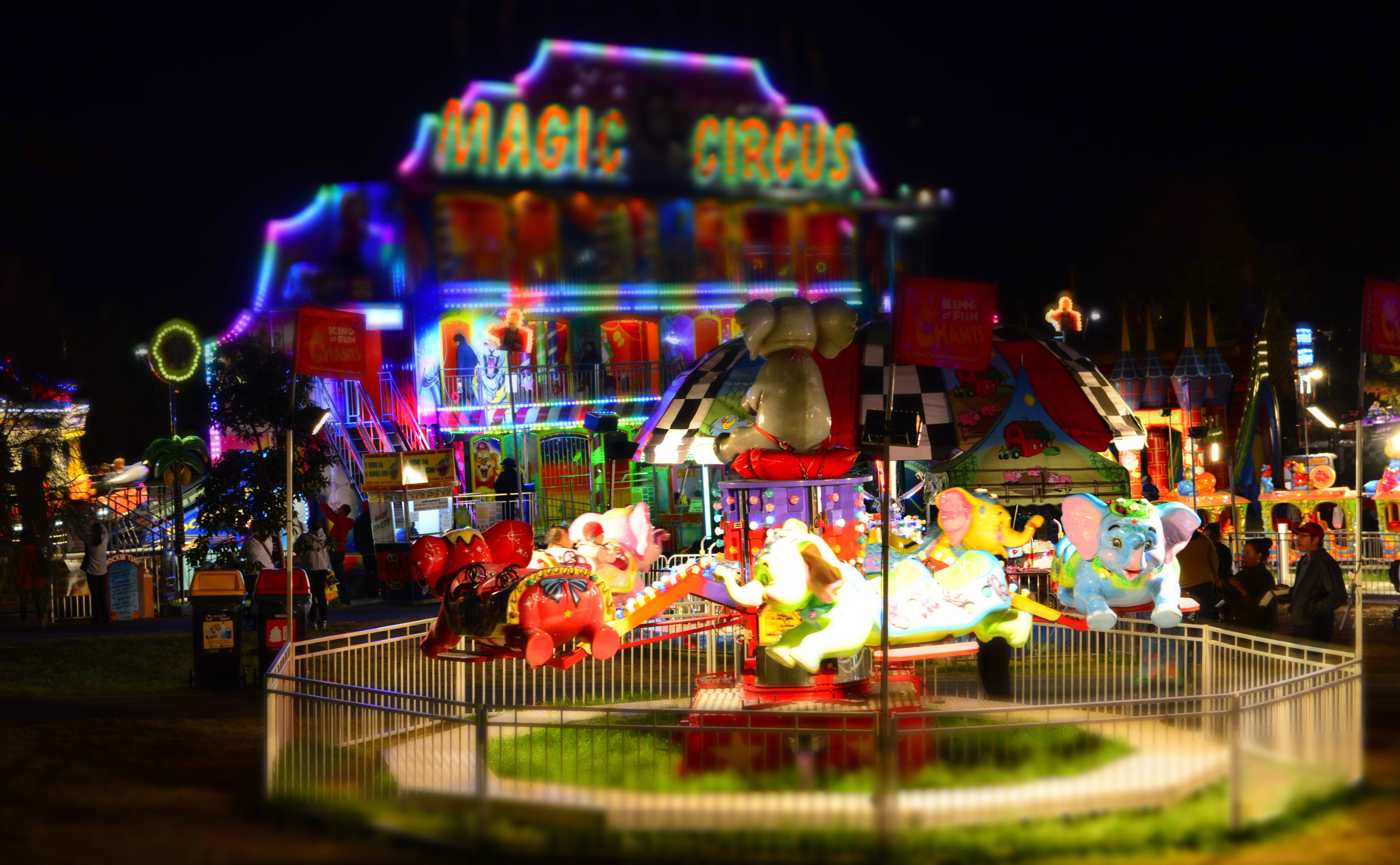
Rides at the Melbourne Show 2013

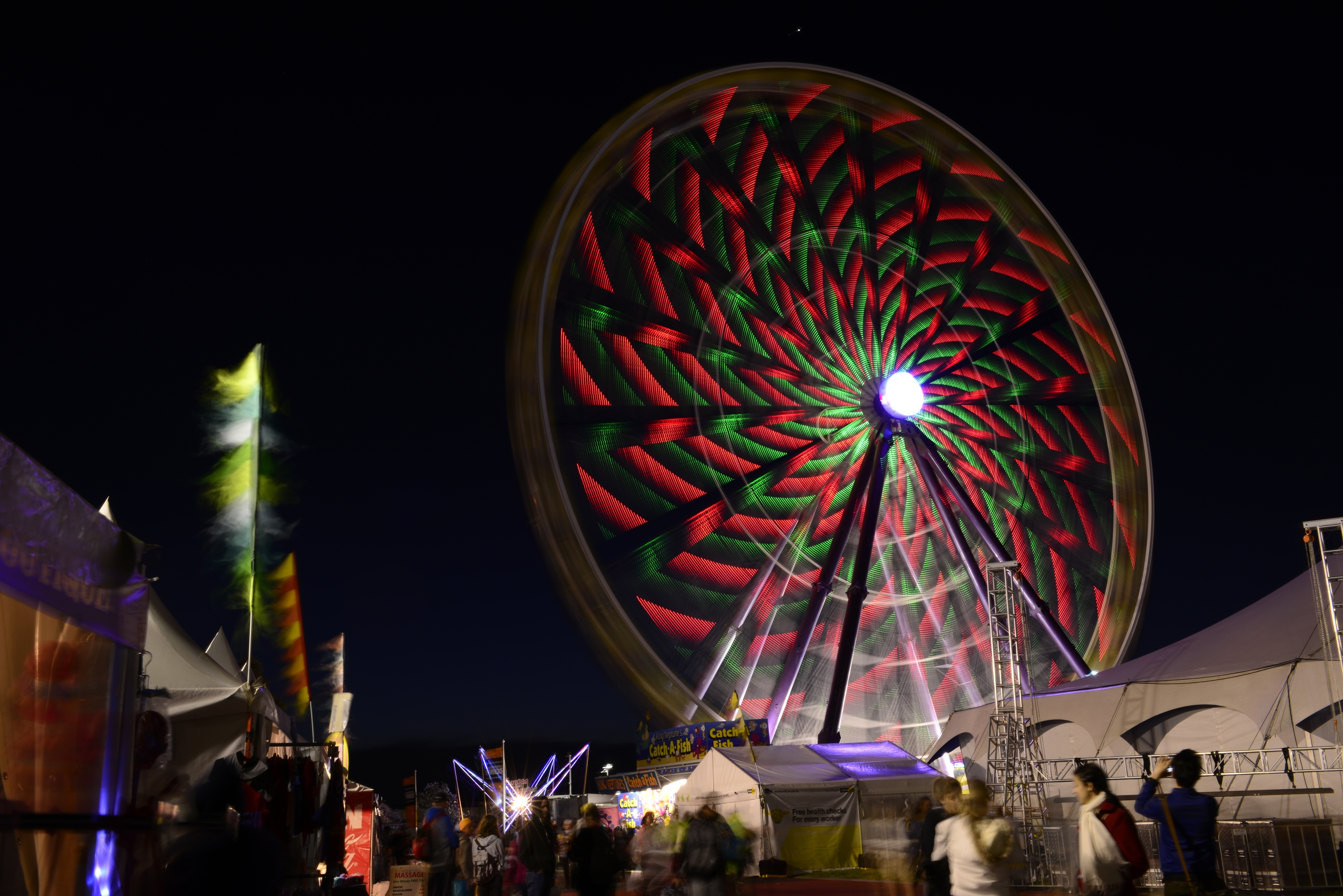
Rides at the Melbourne Show 2013

- Wave Swinger
- Cliff Hanger
- Crazy Spinning Coaster
- Dodgem Cars
- Ferris Wheel
- Rockin' Tug
- Hard Rock
- Techno Jump
- Taipan
- No Limit
- Mad Mouse
- Chaos
- Pirates Revenge Flume Ride
- Roller Ghoster
- Breakdance
- Free Style
- Rock Star
- Xtreme
- Kamikaze
- Power Surge
- Space Roller
- Hangover(replaced the Twin Flip, in 2012)
- XXXL
- Rebel
- Python Loop Coaster
- Mega Drop
- The Beast(Australia's first KMG XXL)
- Fury

The children's rides include:

- Grand Carousel
- Jump Around
- Taxi Jet Car
- Circus Swing
- Harley Hog Motor Bike Ride
- Rockin' Tug
- Flash Dance
- Shark Inflatable
- Tiger Inflatable
- Elephant Jet
- Miniature Railway
- Go Gator Coaster
- Circus Circus
- F1 Euro Slide
- Undersea Mini Wheel
- City Bridge Convoy
- Samba Balloon Ride
- Aladdin Mini Jet
- Cup & Saucer Ride
- Outback Pony Rides
- Outback Rattler
- Free Fall
- Mini Jet
- Train Ride
- Ferrari 500 Racers
- Magic Swans
