= Rip Slyme discography =

- Studio albums: 11
- Extended plays: 2
- Live albums: 1
- Compilation albums: 5
- Singles: 33
- Video albums: 8
- Remix albums: 1

The discography of Japanese musical act Rip Slyme consists of ten studio albums, five compilation albums, two extended plays, one live album, eight video albums and thirty-three singles. Rip Slyme debuted as an independent act on File Records in 1995, releasing material with them until their major label debut under Warner Music Japan in 2000. The band's second album under Warner, Tokyo Classic (2002) was a commercial success, selling over 1,000,000 copies.

Some of the band's most commercially successful songs include "Rakuen Baby" (2002) and "Nettaiya" (2007), summer-themed songs that have both been certified Platinum or higher by the Recording Industry Association of Japan.

Rip Slyme collaborated with the rock band Quruli twice in 2006, when they released the singles "Lovi" and "Juice" simultaneously. The group have worked together with guitarist Tomoyasu Hotei twice: once in 2006 on the single "Battle Funkastic" that mashed-up Rip Slyme's "Funkastic" with Hotei's "Battle Without Honor or Humanity" (2000), and in 2011 when Rip Slyme recorded a cover of Hotei's song "Bambina" for his collaborations album All Time Super Guest.

== Studio albums ==
List of albums, with selected chart positions
Title	Album details	Peak positions	Sales (JPN) (Note: Sales provided by Oricon database and are rounded to the nearest thousand copies.)	Certifications
Title	Album details	JPN	Sales (JPN)	Certifications
Talkin' Cheap	Released: February 21, 1998 (JPN); Label: File Records; Formats: CD, digital download	—		
Five	Released: July 25, 2001 (JPN); Label: Warner Music Japan; Formats: CD, digital download	6	312,000	RIAJ: Gold
Tokyo Classic	Released: July 24, 2002 (JPN); Label: Warner; Formats: CD, digital download	1	955,000	RIAJ: Million
Time to Go	Released: July 16, 2003 (JPN); Label: Warner; Formats: CD, digital download	1	391,000	RIAJ: 2× Platinum
Masterpiece	Released: November 3, 2004 (JPN); Label: Warner; Formats: CD, digital download	2	268,000	RIAJ: Platinum
Epoch	Released: November 29, 2006 (JPN); Label: Warner; Formats: CD, digital download	5	123,000	RIAJ: Platinum
Funfair	Released: November 28, 2007 (JPN); Label: Warner; Formats: CD, digital download	2	134,000	RIAJ: Gold
Journey	Released: June 10, 2009 (JPN); Label: Warner; Formats: CD, CD/DVD, digital download	4	83,000	RIAJ: Gold
Star	Released: March 2, 2011 (JPN); Label: Warner; Formats: CD, digital download	7	34,000	
Golden Time	Released: December 4, 2013 (JPN); Label: Warner; Formats: CD, CD/DVD, digital download	7	30,000	
10	Released: September 30, 2015 (JPN); Label: Warner; Formats: CD, digital download	13	13,000	

== Compilation albums ==
List of albums, with selected chart positions
Title	Album details	Peak positions	Sales (JPN)	Certifications
Title	Album details	JPN	Sales (JPN)	Certifications
Yapparip: Ultime Early Years Collection 1995—2000	Released: October 10, 2003 (JPN); Label: File Records; Formats: CD, digital download	7	60,000	
Good Job! (グッジョブ!, Gujjobu!)	Released: August 31, 2005 (JPN); Label: Warner; Formats: CD, digital download	1	546,000	RIAJ: 2× Platinum
Good Times	Released: August 4, 2010 (JPN); Label: Warner; Formats: 2CD, 2CD/DVD, 2LP, digital download	2	191,000	RIAJ: Gold
Bad Times	Released: December 1, 2010 (JPN); Label: Warner; Formats: 2CD, digital download	11	31,000	
Greatest Five	Released: July 16, 2025 (JPN); Label: Warner; Formats: 3CD, digital download	4	28,302	

== Extended plays ==
Title	Album details
Lip's Rhyme	Released: October 21, 1995 (JPN); Label: File Records; Formats: CD, digital download
Digest 10	Released: September 16, 2015 (JPN); Label: Warner; Formats: Rental CD

== Remix albums ==
List of albums, with selected chart positions
Title	Album details	Peak positions	Sales (JPN)
Title	Album details	JPN	Sales (JPN)
Rip Slyme Orchestra+Plus	Released: February 26, 2003 (JPN); Label: Warner; Formats: 2CD	11	39,000

== Live albums ==
List of albums, with selected chart positions
Title	Album details	Peak positions	Sales (JPN)
Title	Album details	JPN	Sales (JPN)
Live at Budokan 2002.07.25	Released under the pseudonym O.T.F; Released: August 14, 2002 (JPN); Label: Warner Indies; Formats: CD	13	30,000

== Box sets ==
List of box sets, with selected chart positions
Title	Album details	Peak positions	Sales (JPN)
Title	Album details	JPN	Sales (JPN)
20th Anniversary Complete Single Box	Released: April 20, 2014 (JPN); Label: Warner; Formats: 23CD	76	1,000

== Singles ==
=== As lead artists ===
List of singles, with selected chart positions and certifications
Title	Year	Peak chart positions		Sales (JPN)	Certifications	Album
Title	Year	Oricon Singles Charts	Billboard Japan Hot 100 (Note: Sources for chart positions are as follows: "Rakuen Baby", "Hot Chocolate", "Tales", "Taiyō to Bikini", "Love & Hate", "Supreme", "Stairs", "Good Day", "Journey", "Hoshi ni Negai o", "Mata Au Hi made 2010 (Tomita-ryū)", "Scar", "Good Times", "Sense of Wonder", "Amai Seikatsu (La dolce vita)", "Bambina (Bambino Mix)", "Run with...", "Long Vacation", "Jungle Fever", "Sly", "Wanna?", "Kono Michi o Yukō", "Peace", "Popcorn Nancy", "Jump", "Feel", "Take It Easy".)	Sales (JPN)	Certifications	Album
"Hakujitsu" (白日; "Daylight")	1996	48 (Note: 2001 re-release ("Hakujitsu xx") position. "Hakujitsu" / "Mahiru ni Mita Yume" as a double a-side did not chart on the Oricon single charts.)	—	14,000		Talkin' Cheap
"Mahiru ni Mita Yume" (真昼に見た夢; "Daytime Dream")	1996	—	—			Talkin' Cheap
"Fade Away"	1998	—	—			Talkin' Cheap
"At the Lounge"	1998	—	—			Talkin' Cheap
"Tones"	1998	—	—			Talkin' Cheap
"Kaze ni Fukarete" (風に吹かれて; "Blown in the Wind")	1998	—	—			Talkin' Cheap
"Underline No. 5"	2000	—	—			Non-album single
"Mata Au Hi made" (マタ逢ウ日マデ; "Until the Day We Meet Again")	2000	95	—	2,000		Five
"Steppers Delight" (ステッパーズ・ディライト, Suteppāzu Diraito)	2001	23	—	113,000		Five
"Zatsunen Entertainment" (雑念エンタテインメント; "Idle Entertainment")	2001	8	—	80,000		Five
"One"	2001	4	—	325,000	RIAJ (digital): Gold; RIAJ (physical): Gold (Note: A gold certification in Japan prior to 2003 certifies a single as having 200,000 copies shipped to record stores.)	Tokyo Classic
"Funkastic"	2002	2	—	231,000	RIAJ (physical): Gold	Tokyo Classic
"Rakuen Baby" (楽園ベイべー; "Paradise Baby")	2002	2	81 (Note: Charted in 2008.)	301,000	RIAJ (digital): Platinum; RIAJ (physical): Gold	Tokyo Classic
"Blue Be-Bop"	2002	4	—	173,000	RIAJ (physical): Gold	Time to Go
"Joint"	2003	2	—	130,000	RIAJ (physical): Gold	Time to Go
"Dandelion"	2004	2	—	75,000	RIAJ (physical): Gold	Masterpiece
"Galaxy"	2004	5	—	100,000	RIAJ (physical): Gold	Masterpiece
"Tasogare Surround" (黄昏サラウンド; "Twilight Surround")	2004	5	—	77,000	RIAJ (physical): Gold	Masterpiece
"Hot Chocolate"	2006	6	78 (Note: Charted in 2010.)	87,000	RIAJ (physical): Gold	Epoch
"Hey, Brother" (Note: A special release single for the film Mamiya Kyodai.)	2006	11	—	20,000		Non-album single
"Luvi" (ラヴぃ) (Rip Slyme to Quruli)	2006	3	—	58,000		Epoch
"Blow" (ブロウ, Burō)	2006	6	—	50,000	RIAJ (cellphone): Gold; RIAJ (physical): Gold	Epoch
"I.N.G"	2007	—	—			Funfair
"Nettaiya" (熱帯夜; "Tropical Night")	2007	3	—	69,000	RIAJ (ringtone): 3× Platinum; RIAJ (digital): 2× Platinum; RIAJ (physical): Gold	Funfair
"Speed King"	2007	12	—	21,000	RIAJ (digital): Gold	Funfair
"Taiyō to Bikini" (太陽とビキニ; "Sun and Bikini")	2008	7	3	32,000	RIAJ (digital): Gold	Journey
"Stairs"	2009	12	8	18,000		Journey
"Hoshi ni Negai o" (星に願いを; "Wish Upon a Star")	2009	—	82			Good Times
"Mata Au Hi made 2010 (Tomita-ryū)" (マタ逢ウ日マデ2010～冨田流～; "Tomita-style")	2010	10	25	7,000		Good Times
"Run with..."	2013	—	16			Golden Time
"Long Vacation" (ロングバケーション, Rongu Bakēshon)	2013	26	12	5,000		Golden Time
"Jungle Fever" (ジャングルフィーバー, Janguru Fībā)	2013	26	11	4,000		Golden Time
"Sly"	2013	33	3	4,000		Golden Time
"Kono Michi o Yukō" (この道を行こう; "Let's Go Down this Path")	2015	30	68	5,000		10
"Peace" (ピース, Pīsu)	2015	30	22	5,000		10
"Naisho de Onegai Shimasu" (ナイショデオネガイシマス; "Please Keep It a Secret")	2015	30	—	5,000		Non-album single
"Popcorn Nancy"	2015	26	47	5,000		10
"Jump" (with Chay)	2015	26	49	5,000		10
"Itsu made mo" (いつまでも; "Forever")	2015	26	—	5,000		10
"Take It Easy"	2016	TBA	88			Non-album single
"—" denotes items which were released before the creation of the Billboard Japan Hot 100, items that did not chart or items that were ineligible to chart because no physical edition was released.

=== As featured artists ===
List of singles, with selected chart positions and certifications
Title	Year	Peak chart positions		Sales (JPN)	Album
Title	Year	Oricon Singles Charts	Billboard Japan Hot 100	Sales (JPN)	Album
"We Are the Wild" (among Gathering of the All-Stars)	2000	32	—	30,000	Non-album single
"Battle Funkastic" (Hotei vs Rip Slyme)	2006	8	—	68,000	Soul Sessions
"Juice" (Quruli to Rip Slyme)	2006	5	—	43,000	Non-album single
"Wanna?" (Okamoto's vs Rip Slyme)	2014	—	97		VXV
"Feel" (among Unborde All Stars)	2016	—	53		Feel + Unborde Greatest Hits

=== Promotional singles ===
List of promotional singles with selected chart positions and certifications
Title	Year	Peak chart positions			Certifications	Album
Title	Year	Billboard Japan Hot 100	RIAJ monthly ringtones (Note: The RIAJ "Reco-kyō" monthly ringtone chart is a depreciated chart that ran from 2006 until 2009.) (Note: Sources for chart positions are as follows: "Tales", "Remember", "Love & Hate".)	RIAJ Digital Track Chart (Note: The RIAJ Digital Track Chart is a depreciated chart that ran from 2009 until early 2012 and tracked full-length cellphone downloads.) (Note: Sources for chart positions are as follows: "SpongeBob no Theme", "Good Day", "Rock 'n' Roll Radio", "Scar", "Good Times".)	Certifications	Album
"Tales"	2007	79	45	—	RIAJ (digital): Gold	Funfair
"Remember" (featuring Mongol800)	2008	—	73	—		Funfair
"Supa Sonic"	2008	—	—	—		"Taiyō to Bikini" (single)
"Splash"	2008	—	—	—		"Taiyō to Bikini" (single) / Journey
"Love & Hate"	2008	49	42	—		"Stairs" (single) / Journey
"Supreme"	2008	19	—	—		"Stairs" (single)
"SpongeBob no Theme" (スポンジ・ボブのテーマ) (Note: Animated series SpongeBob SquarePants Japanese theme song)	2009	—	—	39		Non-album single
"Good Day"	2009	10	—	41		Journey
"Journey"	2009	100	—	—		Journey
"Rock 'n' Roll Radio"	2009	—	—	98		Journey
"Good Times"	2010	21	—	24		Good Times
"Scar"	2010	11	—	11	RIAJ (cellphone): Gold	Good Times
"Sense of Wonder" (センス・オブ・ワンダー, Sensu obu Wandā)	2011	5	—	—		Star
"Amai Seikatsu (La dolce vita)" (甘い生活～La dolce vita～; "The Sweet Life")	2011	28	—	—		Star
"Bambina (Bambino Mix)" (バンビーナ, Banbīna) (Note: Hotei Tomoyasu collaboration and cover for his album All Time Super Guest.)	2011	52	—	—		All Time Super Guest
"Jack Goes On" (Note: Remake of "The Beat Goes On", in a commercial campaign for Jack Daniel's whiskey.)	2011	—	—	—		Star
"Ride On" (Note: Theme song for the film Boku-tachi Kyūkō: A-Ressha de Ikō.)	2011	—	—	—		Star
"Ah! Yeah!"	2013	— (Note: Charted at number 95 on the Adult Contemporary Airplay chart.)	—	—		Golden Time
"Metropolis" (メトロポリス, Metoroporisu)	2015	— (Note: Charted at number 74 on the Radio Songs sub-chart.)	—	—		10
"Baile Tokyo"	2016	— (Note: Charted at number 57 on the Radio Songs sub-chart.)	—	—		Non-album single
"—" denotes items which were released in periods before or after the RIAJ ringtone or digital track charts existed, or items that did not manage to chart.

== Video albums ==
List of media, with selected chart positions
Title	Album details	Peak positions	
Title	Album details	JPN DVD	JPN Blu-ray
Shortcuts!	Released: March 26, 2003 (JPN); Label: Warner; Formats: DVD	3	—
Rough-Cut Five	Released: April 13, 2005 (JPN); Label: Warner; Formats: DVD	4	—
Cut It Now!	Released: May 23, 2007 (JPN); Label: Warner; Formats: DVD	5	—
Rip Slyme Funfair Tour Final at Budokan	Released: July 16, 2008 (JPN); Label: Warner; Formats: DVD	7	—
Quick Cut	Released: September 23, 2009 (JPN); Label: Warner; Formats: DVD	7	—
Good Times DVD: The Complete Music Video Clips 2001-2011	Released: September 28, 2011 (JPN); Label: Warner; Formats: DVD	5	—
Good Times DVD: The Best Live Performance 2002-2011	Released: November 9, 2011 (JPN); Label: Warner; Formats: DVD	3	—
Dance Floor Massive IV Plus+	Released: March 26, 2014 (JPN); Label: Warner; Formats: DVD, Blu-ray	20	51
