= Royal Geelong Show =

Annual event

Coordinates: 38.1705°S 144.3744°E

- Also called: 'The Show'
- Observed by: Geelong
- Type: northern public holiday
- Significance: Royal Geelong Agricultural & Pastoral Society Incorporated
- Celebrations: Agricultural displays, sideshows, fashion parades
- Date: Thursday through to Sunday, ending on the third Sunday in October
- Frequency: annual

The Royal Geelong Show is an annual event held at the Geelong Showgrounds. Established in 1855, it is principally an agricultural event which focuses on the primary industries of Victoria, and rural lifestyle of many Victorians with events such as livestock judging, equestrian events, animal breeders competitions, produce competitions and wood chopping, although it also incorporates live entertainment, sporting events, food tasting, and fashion shows. A popular feature of the show is the sideshows which feature showrides, foodstalls, games of skill, and showbag stalls.

Unlike its capital-city counterpart, the Royal Melbourne Show, over recent years the Royal Geelong Show has maintained its agricultural focus, with displays of many classes of animals, and has a carnival atmosphere.

The show runs for four days, from Thursday through to Sunday, ending on the third Sunday in October. The Saturday is known as family day and usually involves many discounts and savings on showbags and rides.

The show was cancelled in 2020 and 2021 because of the COVID-19 pandemic.
