= Sideshow alley =

Australian term for amusements

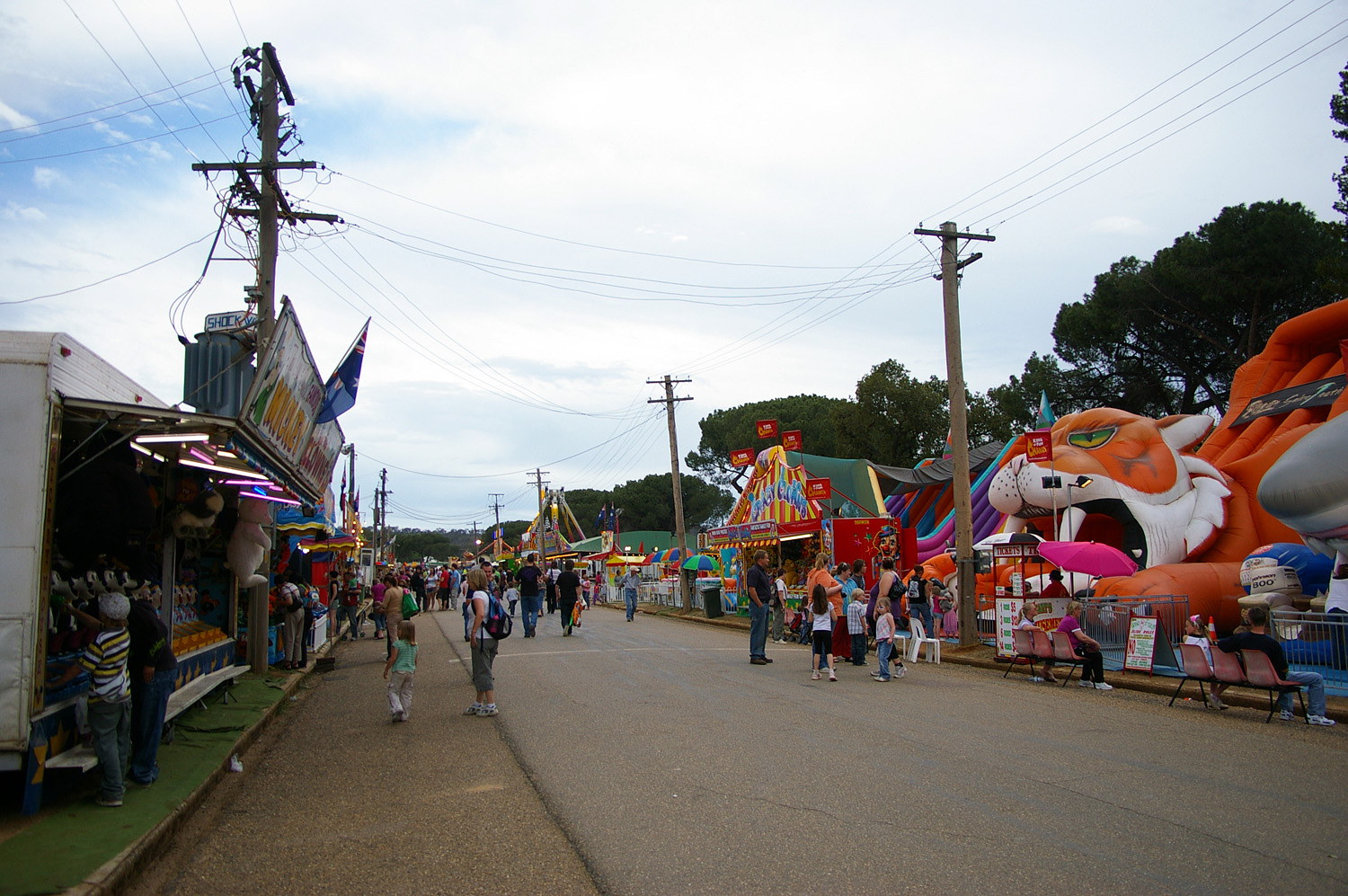
Sideshow alley at a show in Wagga Wagga, New South Wales

A sideshow alley is an Australian term for the cluster of attractions that may accompany public events such as agricultural shows. It is similar to the American term 'midway'. Australian sideshows typically comprise a variety of amusement rides, games, and concession booths, run by a community of independent operators known as 'showies'.

== History ==
The origins of the Australian sideshow alley can be traced back to the ancient fair culture of Britain. By the 1880s, they were a regular part of agricultural shows in Australia.

Sideshows in Australia have changed considerably in the last 40 years. The 1970s saw the removal of freak shows, strip shows and other non-family entertainments. This was accompanied by an influx of expensive thrill rides and novelties imported from the United States and Europe.

Higher expenses and running costs and inflated public liability premiums are among the recent challenges facing the 500-plus families that make up today's sideshow alley and travelling amusement industry in Australia.
