= Hoadley's Chocolates =

Australian confectionery company

Hoadley's
- Type: Private (1913–72)
- Industry: Food
- Founded: 1913
- Founder: Abel Hoadley
- Defunct: 1972; 54 years ago
- Fate: Acquired by Rowntree Mackintosh Confectionery in 1972, merged to it
- Headquarters: Australia
- Products: Chocolate bars
- Brands: Polly Waffle; Violet Crumble

Hoadley's Chocolates was an Australian confectionery company founded in 1913 famous for the Polly Waffle and Violet Crumble chocolate bars. The company was bought by Rowntree Mackintosh Confectionery in 1972, which was acquired by Nestlé in 1988.

== History ==
=== Origin ===
Hoadley's Chocolates had its origin in A. Hoadley and Company, a jam company founded in South Melbourne in 1889 by English businessman Abel Hoadley. The company originally manufactured jams, but expanded its range to include preserved fruits, candied fruits and peels, and sauces using fruit from Hoadley's orchards at nearby Burwood. In 1895, Hoadley opened the Rising Sun Preserving Works in St Kilda Road, and by 1901 had four preserving factories.

To overcome the seasonal nature associated with his fruit products, Hoadley diversified, and in 1901 or 1902 bought the former factory of Dillon, Burrows & Co. near Princes Bridge. He then shifted his company's emphasis more towards confectionery products and commenced the production of cocoa and chocolate. In 1910 Hoadley sold the jam company to Henry Jones Co-operative, retaining only the confectionery side of the business and the Princes Bridge factory, trading under the name Hoadley & Sons Ltd. Hoadley soon began looking for investors in a new business venture exclusively making chocolates. Application for registration of the new company, Hoadley's Chocolates Ltd, was filed in 1913 and the new company was operating by the end of the year. Hoadley retired the same year and passed control of the company to four of his sons: Walter as managing director, Peter as Purchasing Officer, Albert as Marketing Officer and Charles as Chairman of Directors (although in reality this was a minor role due to his active personal life outside the family business). Hoadley died in 1918 but the company continued under his sons.

The company's first product was the Violet Milk Chocolates (later called Hoadley's Chocolate Assortment) named after Hoadley's wife's favourite flower, launched the year the new company was founded. Later that year the company launched the Violet Crumble; (Note: Some sources put the date of the introduction of the Violet Crumble as later than 1913, possibly 1917 to 1923, and credit its invention to Hoadley's sons.) Hoadley originally wanted to just call the product 'Crumble' but discovered this would cause problems in obtaining a trademark, and continued his homage to his wife by calling the product the Violet Crumble.

=== Expansion ===
Originally, the sale of Hoadley's products was limited to just Victoria (mainly Melbourne). Earliest records for interstate sales appeared in Western Australia in 1921, with advertisements for Violet Crumble by the Perth department store Boans in the lead-up to Christmas. They were sold by the box, for two shillings and sixpence (25 cents) and individual bars became available for sale the following year. In 1923 Hoadley's registered Violet Crumble as a trademark. Advertisements for Violet Crumble later appeared in interstate newspapers, including the Adelaide Advertiser, with records dating back to at least 1923.

In the 1930s the company was on the verge of bankruptcy, but was brought back to profitability mostly through a series of imaginative marketing campaigns by Albert, such as series of collectable cards, many featuring popular Australian an international sporting celebrities of the day, included with various product lines.

Hoadley's Violet Chocolates, c. 1947

During the 1940s sales and profits for the company continued to rise and in 1947 the Polly Waffle was launched, which went on to become Hoadley's second most popular product line behind the Violet Crumble. Like the Violet Crumble and Violet Chocolate Assortment before it, the Polly Waffle followed the company's tradition of a mostly purple wrapper.

In the post-war years the company continued to operate under Hoadley's sons and more product lines were introduced to the market. Later (possibly in or around 1962) Albert's son Gordon assumed the role of managing director and presided over the company until its takeover by Rowntree's in 1972.

=== New ownership ===
After years of financial struggles in the 1960s, Hoadley's Chocolates was bought out by the British chocolate manufacturer Rowntree's in 1972, when it then became known as Rowntree Hoadley Ltd. The new company rationalised its product line and some of the less popular products from the Hoadley's Chocolates era were discontinued. New confectionery items, many non-chocolate, were added to the product range.

In 1988 Rowntree Hoadley was acquired by the Swiss conglomerate Nestlé and the remaining Hoadley's products were then sold originally under the Rowntree Nestlé brand and later just as Nestlé.

In 2018 Nestlé sold the rights to the Violet Crumble to South Australian confectioner Robern Menz. In 2019 Menz also bought the rights to the Polly Waffle from Nestlé, which the company had discontinued in 2009. Production is expected to recommence in 2023.

== Products ==
=== Confectionery ===
Hoadley's products prior to the company's takeover by Rowntree's included

- 5 Star Bubble Gum: discontinued, date unknown.
- Arctic Mints: green and white peppermint-flavoured candy balls with a milk chocolate centre packaged in a cardboard can. Discontinued, date unknown.
- Bertie Beetle: introduced in 1963, still in production (now made in New Zealand).
- Clancy Bar: wafers with a jam centre coated in dark chocolate. The bar took its name from the poem Clancy of the Overflow and Hoadley's promoted the product through sponsored readings of the poem on various radio stations around the country. Believed to have been first produced in the 1950s (possibly 1956) it is now discontinued, date unknown.
- Crumblettes: bite-sized pieces of Violet Crumble packaged in a rectangular box. Discontinued, date unknown.
- Lady Beetle: a white chocolate version of Bertie Beetle, possibly with caramel pieces rather than honeycomb. It was only available in showbags but is now discontinued, date unknown.
- Luncheon: a wafer bar filled with caramel cream and peanuts coated in milk chocolate. Discontinued, date unknown.
- MinTex Bar: A twin-layer bar of peppermint fudge and caramel base dipped in milk chocolate.
- Polly Waffle: introduced in 1947, discontinued in 2009. Due to resume production (by Robern Menz) in 2023.
- Tex-Bar: A twin-layer bar with a caramel base and a malt cream fudge top coated in dark chocolate. Advertised as "the King of candy bars". Discontinued, date unknown.
- Violet Crumble: introduced in 1913, still in production.
- Violet Chocolate Assortment: an assortment of various flavoured milk chocolates packaged in a box. Hoadley's original product, it appears to have been discontinued around the time of the company's buy-out by Rowntree's.
- White Knight: believed to have been first produced in the 1950s (c1956), discontinued in 2016. (Note: As well as the White Knight there were also caramel, musk and spearmint varieties. However, these varieties appear to have been products of Rowntree Hoadley, rather than Hoadley's Chocolates, and production appears to have ceased prior to the Nestlé takeover in 1988.)

=== Other consumables ===
Hoadley's also made consumable products that were not confectionery, including:

- cough mixture

== Marketing strategies ==
From the 1930s, Hoadley's used a number of imaginative marketing strategies and alternate distribution channels to increase their sales.

=== Chocolate boxes ===
In the 1950s Hoadley's began the manufacture of elaborate hard plastic chocolate boxes featuring embossed designs, sold with their Violet Chocolate Assortment. The original theme was a pale purple colour featuring a wave-like sculptured lid and a gold ribbon embedded with violets on its upper left. Later designs included a rose theme (available in multiple colours) and an Oriental theme which was marketed as 'Pagoda Chocolates'. These boxes are now sought after by collectors and may be found at auctions and auction sites.

=== Collectable cards ===
During the 1930s and 1940s a number of Hoadley's products came with collectable cards. Collection series included:

- Empire Games and Test Teams (cricket)
- Victorian Football League players.
- Victorian football "action" series
- the Wild West

Depending on the series and year of printing, sets had between 50 and 100 cards. These cards are now sought after by collectors and may be found at auctions, auction sites and trading card dealers.

=== Radio broadcasts ===
In 1956 to promote their new Clancy Bar, Hoadley's Chocolates commissioned the reading of the Banjo Paterson poem Clancy of the Overflow (from which the chocolate bar was named) across a number of radio stations across the country (possibly in the evenings of Monday 20 to Wednesday 22 August). Radio stations that participated in this event included:

- 2HD Newcastle
- 2KA Katoomba
- 2UW Sydney
- 3UZ Melbourne
- 4BC Brisbane
- 4SB Kingaroy
- 5AU Port Augusta
- 5KA Adelaide
- 5RM Renmark
- 6PM Perth
- 7HO Hobart
- 7LA Launceston

=== Showbags ===
As well as being sold in shops, Hoadley's products wee also available in showbags at annual Australian shows such as Brisbane's Ekka and Sydney's Royal Easter Show. These included:

- Bertie Beetle showbag: following the success of the introduction of the Bertie Beetle the product gained its own showbag in 1965, mostly containing a number of Bertie Beetle chocolates and was traditionally the cheapest showbag on sale at the shows.
- Hoadley's Chocolate showbag (later the Violet Crumble showbag): contained an assortment of Hoadley's products including one or more Polly Waffles, Violet Crumbles and White Knights. When Hoadley's first began producing Bertie Beetle in 1963, it first appeared in this showbag at the Sydney Royal Easter Show of that year.
- Lady Beetle showbag: following the success of the Bertie Beetle showbag, a similar bag featuring the Lady Beetle (a white chocolate version of Bertie Beetle) was launched in the 1970s. It did not prove as successful and was later withdrawn from sale, possibly before the Nestlé takeover.

The contents of these showbags varied over the years.

=== Sponsorships ===
In 1966 Hoadley's Chocolates began sponsoring Hoadley's Battle of the Sounds, an annual contest for unsigned music bands which began the previous year. Hoadley's sponsorship of the contest continued until the company's buy-out by Rowntree's in 1972.

== Factory locations ==
Hoadley's factory near Princes Bridge, South Melbourne c. 1900

Hoadley's Chocolates had factories and other major premises in the following cities:

- Melbourne: Hoadley's original confectionery factory was the former premises of Dillon Burrows & Co. located on the south bank of the Yarra River near Princes Bridge, to the west of St Kilda Road. The factory was demolished around 1983 for the construction of Southbank, with production transferred to the Rowntree Hoadley factory at Campbellfield in the northern suburbs, which was extended in 1977 to cater for increased product lines. The factory is still in operation under Nestlé's ownership.
- Adelaide: in the post-war years (exact date unknown) Hoadley's opened a large factory in Carrington Street (on or near the corner of Surflen Street) in Adelaide and transferred production of the Violet Crumble from their South Melbourne factory. Following Rowntree's buy-out in 1972 this factory was extensively utilised for Rowntree-Hoadley's expanded product line, especially for many non-chocolate products. In the 1980s production at this factory began scaling back as the company consolidated operations in Melbourne, which lead to large-scale workforce redundancies. By the time of the Nestlé takeover in 1988, all operations had ceased and the plant had closed. While Nestlé still maintains a manufacturing presence in Adelaide, it is not in the same premises.
- Sydney: a large factory and distribution centre was constructed at Rosebery in South Sydney in the post-war years. Following Rowntree's buy-out in 1972, production was subsequently scaled back and transferred to Rowntree-Hoadley factories in other cities, eventually leaving only the distribution centre before all operations ceased in the late 1970s. In 1981, the derelict premises were destroyed in a major fire. Another factory existing in Annandale in Sydney's inner west, opened c1962 by the company's managing Director Gordon Hoadley. It is believed to have closed in the 1970s when operations were consolidated after the company was bought out by Rowntree's and production transferred to Melbourne.

== Later issues ==
=== Consumer backlash ===
Following Nestlé's takeover of Rowntree Hoadley Ltd in 1988, many of the original Hoadley's products were subsequently withdrawn from sale creating backlash from the Australian public. Campaigns were often started by consumer groups pressuring Nestle to re-introduce the discontinued products.

In the early-mid 2000s, Nestlé withdrew the Bertie Beetle Showbag from sale at annual shows, citing production costs as the product was now manufactured in New Zealand and shipped to Australia. A public campaign was started pressuring Nestlé to bring back the showbag, which was a crowd favourite. In 2007 Nestlé relented and the showbag was again available, first reappearing in that year's Sydney Royal Easter Show. In 2006 the price of the showbag, traditionally $2, was raised to $3, resulting in public backlash. In 2007 the showbag returned to its previous price and has remained at $2 since.

The Polly Waffle chocolate bar, originally developed by Hoadley's, were later commercialised by Rowntree Mackintosh and then by Nestlé.

In mid-2009, Nestlé introduced a new recipe for the Polly Waffle along with new packaging. The new product was the same appearance as the older one, but contained a more sugary and brittle wafer and was not popular with the buying public. After 62 years production Nestlé discontinued the Polly Waffle on 23 November 2009 citing poor sales. In 2019 Nestlé signed a deal with the South Australian confectioner Robern Menz (who previously bought the rights to Violet Crumble from Nestlé in 2018) for production to resume at that company's factory in Adelaide, partly financed with federal government funding. Production is slated to recommence in 2023.

In 2010 Nestlé discontinued production of "fun size" packets of Violet Crumble citing production costs. Despite calls from the public to re-introduce these bags, Nestlé refused. In 2019, after the rights to the product were purchased by and production was transferred to Robern Menz, the bags reappeared in supermarkets. In 2020 the company launched new flavours, including caramel.

In 2014 Nestlé signed a deal that resulted in White Knight bars only being available from the major supermarkets Coles and Woolworths, along with a few small confectionery shops. Previously sold at a lower price reflecting the bar's smaller size (25g), the two supermarkets soon raised the product's price to match that of larger chocolate bars (typically weighing 50g-80g). In spite of public complaints, Nestlé refused to intervene (nor make the product available for sale through other retailers) and sales subsequently fell. In 2016, Nestlé discontinued production of the White Knight, citing poor sales.

=== Production stoppages ===
At the peak of its operations the company was the biggest customer in Victoria for sugar produced by CSR, the Colonial Sugar Refining company. In 1988 Rowntree Hoadley temporarily ceased production after running out of sugar after a strike by CSR workers, and stood down around 700 members of its workforce.

=== Rosebery fire ===
On the afternoon of 3 October 1981 a major fire broke out at the Rowntree-Hoadley factory in Rosebery, Sydney. The factory, which had already ceased operations and demolition work begun, was completely destroyed by the blaze, which was not extinguished until the following morning.
