= Polly Waffle =

Chocolate bar

- Product type: Chocolate bar
- Current owner: Menz Confectionery
- Country: Australia
- Introduced: 1947
- Discontinued: 2009; 17 years ago
- Previous owners: Hoadley's

Polly Waffle is a 50 gram Australian chocolate bar. It is a waffle wafer tube filled with marshmallow and coated in compound chocolate. The confection had been introduced in 1947 by the Hoadley's Chocolate Company, then taken over by Rowntree Mackintosh Confectionery in 1972. When Rowntree Mackintosh was acquired by Nestlé in 1988, the Swiss company continued producing Polly Waffles until they were discontinued in 2009.

In 2019, it was announced that Australian confectioner Robern Menz, since January 2022 rebranded Menz Confectionery, had signed an agreement with rights holder Nestlé to produce the bites version of Polly Waffle. The relaunch of the product occurred in April 2024.

== History ==
Abel Hoadley opened a jam factory in South Melbourne, Victoria, in 1889, trading as A. Hoadley & Company. By 1895, business had expanded rapidly and Hoadley built a five-storey premises, the Rising Sun Preserving Works. He produced fruit preserves, including jams and jellies, candied fruit and peels, sauces, and confectionery, and employed a workforce as large as two hundred. By 1901, there were four preserving factories and a large confectionery works. Hoadley had acquired the firm of Dillon, Burrows & Co. and extended his products to vinegar, cocoa, and chocolate.

In 1910, the jam business was sold to Henry Jones Co-operative Ltd and in 1913, Hoadley's Chocolates Ltd was formed. The same year, Hoadley produced his first chocolate assortment. Hoadley's Chocolates made the first Polly Waffle bar in Melbourne in 1947. It was conceived by company accounts supervisor and family friend, Mayfield B. Anthony.

In 1972, Hoadley's Chocolates was acquired by Rowntree Mackintosh Confectionery and became known as "Rowntree Hoadley Ltd". In 1988, Nestlé acquired Rowntree. The Rowntree chocolate brands were initially branded as Nestlé-Rowntree, until Nestlé dropped the 'Rowntree' name altogether.

During the 1970s, the advertising slogan for Polly Waffle was "mmm, crunch, aah!".

In mid-2009, a new recipe for Polly Waffle was released along with new packaging announcing the change. The new product was the same appearance as the older product, but contained a more sugary and brittle wafer. On 23 November 2009 Nestlé discontinued Polly Waffle after 62 years due to poor sales.

In 2015, Melbourne-based company Chocolate Works released "The Great Aussie Waffle Log", a product specifically designed to mimic the Polly Waffle, in response to a social media campaign calling for the resurrection of the classic bar.

In 2019, Adelaide confectioner Robern Menz signed a deal with Nestlé to produce the Polly Waffle, a year after purchasing the rights to produce the Violet Crumble, also from Nestlé. The company said in 2020 that the chocolate bar would be back to stores in 2022, but by January 2022 this date was pushed back to 2024. As of April 2024, the Polly Waffle has been brought back to store shelves in the form of Polly Waffle Bites, which are Polly Waffles in the form of small bite-sized orbs.

== In popular culture ==
"Polly Waffle" is sometimes used by Australians as a euphemism for faeces. In May 2014, a member of the Liberal Party of Australia described a government budget delivered by Treasurer Joe Hockey as "about as popular as a Polly Waffle floating in a public pool".

A popular childhood prank involved throwing a Polly Waffle into a public swimming pool, to imitate faeces.

It is also used to describe lies told by loquacious politicians, since 'pollie' is Australian slang for 'politician' and 'waffle' means 'to speak or write vaguely and evasively'. "The pollie without the waffle" has been used as a slogan for election campaigns.
