= Bertie Beetle =

Chocolate bar

- Product type: Chocolate bar
- Produced by: Nestle
- Country: Australia
- Introduced: 1963
- Previous owners: Hoadley's Chocolates

Bertie Beetle is a small chocolate bar manufactured by Nestlé. It consists of a chocolate coated bar containing small pieces of honeycomb that is shaped like an anthropomorphised beetle. It was originally created as a way to use up honeycomb left over from the production of Violet Crumble bars. Originally manufactured in Australia, today they are manufactured in a factory in New Zealand.

For many years, Bertie Beetles were generally only available to the public in showbags sold at Australian agricultural shows.

== History ==
The Bertie Beetle was first produced in 1963 by Hoadley's Chocolates, who were later taken over by the Rowntree Company and became Rowntree Hoadley Ltd (the company was later acquired by Nestlé in 1988). Intended to rival MacRobertson's (later Cadbury's) Freddo Frog, it was launched with advertisements featuring VFL footballer Ron Barassi, and was sold in shops until the 1970s. At some point after, a deal was made to only sell the chocolate at shows and exhibitions in showbags.

In 2007, Bertie Beetle multi-packs were briefly available in supermarkets under Nestlé's Willy Wonka sub-brand. Bertie Beetles returned to select confectionery stores in 2018. In 2019 Peters launched a Bertie Beetle ice cream.

Bertie Beetle stopped having pieces of honeycomb in them when Nestlé no longer made Violet Crumble, but it retains honeycomb flavour.

=== Showbags ===
Bertie Beetles are best known for their inclusion in the cheap classic Bertie Beetle showbag, sold at various shows around Australia. Although initially included in Hoadley's Chocolate Showbag starting in 1963 (alongside Polly Waffle, Violet Crumble and White Knight bars), Bertie Beetle did not receive its own bag until 1965. The showbag, which as of 2022 comes with a few Bertie Beetles and other confections such as Red Ripperz, was sold for A$2 for many decades, increasing to $3 in 2006, returning to $2 in 2007, and increasing to $3 again in 2022.

The Bertie Beetle showbag is one of the most popular showbags ever made. At the 2017 Brisbane Ekka, more than 250,000 showbags were sold. When the showbag was briefly withdrawn from sale at shows, Nestlé bowed to the ensuing consumer pressure and recommenced sale of the bag. In 2023, production issues saw supply of the showbag rationed at shows in Brisbane, Adelaide and Melbourne, which also led it to being withdrawn from sale at the 2023 Perth Royal Show.

Other variants of the Bertie Beetle showbag are offered with more items and at a higher price. In 2003, the Bertie Beetle Bonanza showbag was created to celebrate the 40th anniversary of Bertie Beetle, which came with many Bertie Beetles as well as a choice of a branded cooler bag or a basketball. In 2006, there were four variants: a small red bag, a medium-sized blue bag, a large gold bag, and the '1-2-3' bag, containing those three bags and some extras. In 2009, there were a number of bags, including Bertie Beetle Blue, Gold, and Platinum bags along with the Bertie Beetle Bonanza bag and a Bertie Beetle Triple Deal bag, which like the 1-2-3 bag contained the three coloured Bertie Beetle bags. In 2013, a 50th anniversary special edition of the Bertie Beetle showbag was made available, consisting of 50 Bertie Beetle chocolates and a mask. In 2019, the Bertie Beetle Retro Showbag was introduced to the range; it included a retro paper bag, Bertie Beetle chocolate bars and a choice of a bucket hat, socks, a collector's tin or 2 enamel camping mugs with retro graphics. In 2021 the most expensive Bertie Beetle showbag variant sold for $18. The Bertie Beetle showbag brand is currently managed by showbag company Chicane Marketing, which acts as an agent for Nestlé and produces other branded showbags for the multinational company.

In 2016, a range of Bertie Beetle showbags and other products were made available to purchase online. The Bertie Beetle Biggest Showbag included 80 Bertie Beetle chocolates. The Bertie Beetle Bounty Box included 150 Bertie Beetle chocolates and comes in a gift box. The Bertie Beetle Bulk Bundle is a carton of 250 Bertie Beetles, and the Bertie Beetle Huge Haul included 350 Bertie Beetle chocolates.

No longer available is Lady Beetle, Bertie's white chocolate equivalent, which had its own, slightly more expensive showbag.

== Ingredients ==
The standard weight of the bar is 10 grams. Ingredients are Sugar, Vegetable Fat, [Emulsifiers (Soy Lecithin, 492)], Milk Solids, Toffee Pieces (8%) – Sugar, Glucose Syrup derived from wheat, Vegetable Fat, Sodium Bicarbonate – Cocoa, Emulsifier (Soy Lecithin), Salt, Flavourings.
