= Kariwara District Scout Headquarters =

Former textiles factory in Melbourne, Victoria, Australia

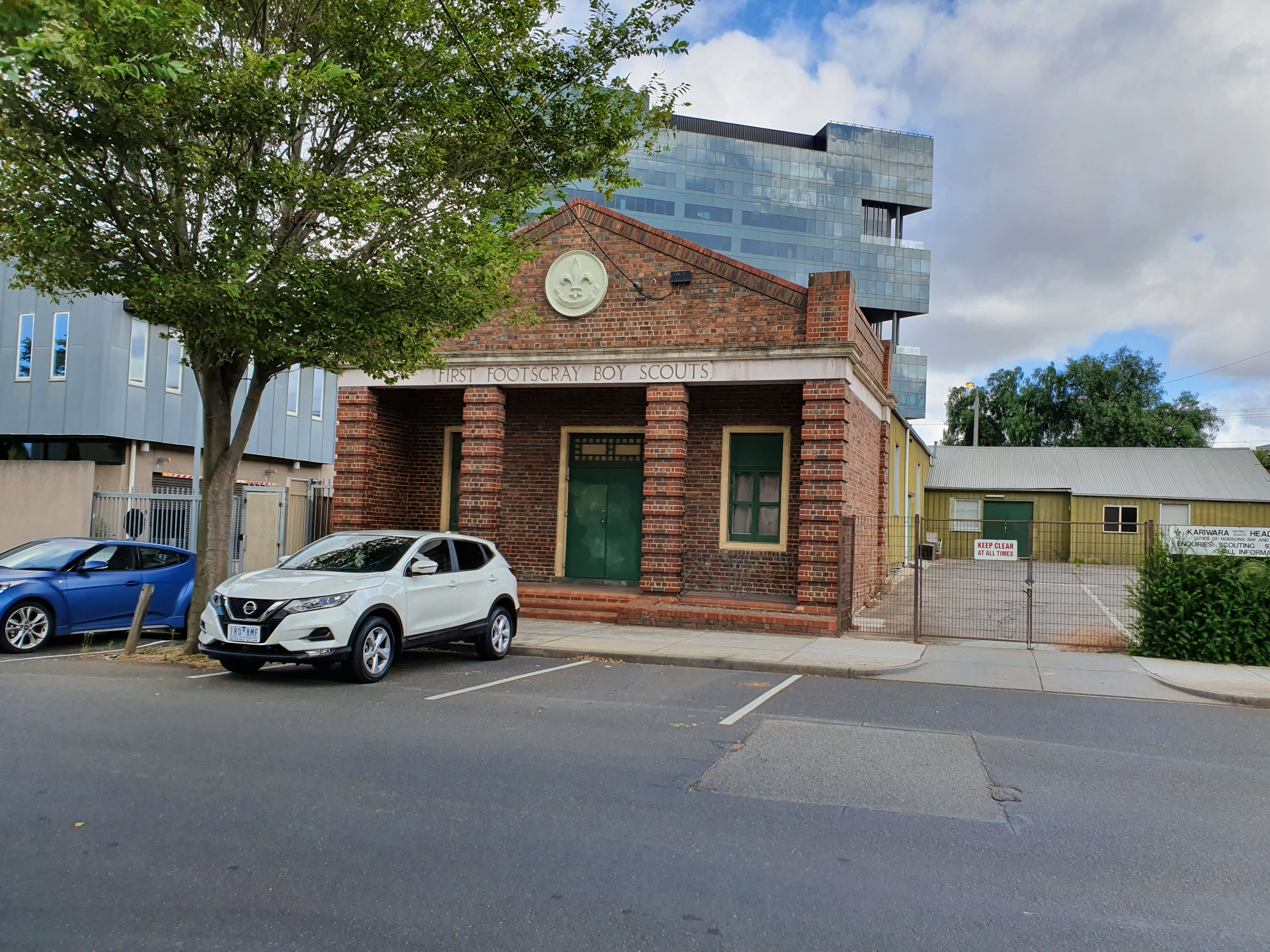
- The scout hall in 2020

- Location within Melbourne
- Interactive map of the Kariwara District Scout Headquarters area
- Alternative names: First Footscray Scout Hall; Kariwara Scout Hall

General information
- Status: Completed
- Type: Scout hall
- Architectural style: Stripped Classical
- Location: 4 Hyde Street, Footscray, Melbourne, Victoria, Australia
- Coordinates: 37°48′13″S 144°54′05″E
- Completed: 1925; 101 years ago (building completed)
- Client: Scouting movement in Australia

Technical details
- Material: Red bricks, iron roof

Victorian Heritage Register
- Official name: Kariwara District Scout Headquarters
- Type: Registered place
- Designated: 4 September 1997
- Reference no.: H1343
- Heritage overlay no.: HO47
- Category: Community Facilities

The Kariwara District Scout Headquarters, previously known as the First Footscray Scout Hall, is a heritage-listed scout hall, located at 4 Hyde Street in Footscray, an inner-western suburb of Melbourne, in Victoria, Australia. Founded as a scouting organisation in 1909, it was the first permanent scout hall in Victoria, completed in 1925 and modified several times since, the building has been in continual used by the Scouting movement since the 1920s.

The site was added to the Victorian Heritage Register on 4 September 1997 in recognition of its historical and social importance. The Victorian branch of the National Trust identified the site on an unknown date as having some form of heritage potential and was added by the City of Maribyrnong to a non-statutory local heritage list, also on an unknown date.

== History ==
In 1908, Robert Baden-Powell trialled a boy's camp off Poole in Dorset and wrote a manifesto for the proposed Boy Scout movement. He retired from the British Army two years later to dedicate the setting up of the Boy Scout movement. By 1909, Boy Scout troops sprang up in the United Kingdom, Europe and various parts of the British Empire. The movement was often spontaneous and in some troops there was often no adult troop leader.

The First Footscray Boy Scout troop was formed in 1909 and by 1913 held a lease on the land from the Victorian Railways Department. In 1925, a converted wood-workshop was repurposed as a permanent scout hall. The brick facade incorporating a Scout emblem was completed in 1929. Cub Scouts, Rover Scouts (both c. 1919) and Girl Guides (1946) have used the site as the centre of their activities. The hall was also used as a recruitment centre during World War II. The Scouting movement has continued to use the site to the present day.

== Description ==
The hall contains carved fire surrounds, a fleur-de-lis candelabra, and brushwood chairs and table.

The site has a long-term association with Charles Hoadley CBE, a geologist who was part of Douglas Mawson's Australasian Antarctic Expedition from 1911 to 1914. With Mawson's consent, the Footscray Rover crew took on the name 'Mawson's Rovers'. Hoadley became Scoutmaster of 1st Footscray in 1921 and was instrumental in finding and having the hall moved to its present location. In 1924 he was invited to organise Scout Leader training in Victoria. In 1926 he instigated the first Scout Leader training course and in conjunction with a friend, purchased land at Gembrook which they donated to the Scout Association and "Gilwell Park" the Associations principal Scout Park was founded. From 1928 to 1937, Hoadley was the Chief Commissioner for Scouting in Victoria. In 1932 he re-organised the Scout Movement within Victorian and decentralised the administration. Appointed a Commander of the Order of the British Empire in 1936, Hoadley died in 1947, while chairman of the State Executive Committee of the Scout Association of Victoria.

== See also ==
- Scouting and Guiding in Victoria
- List of places on the Victorian Heritage Register in the City of Maribyrnong
