= Violet Crumble =

Australian brand of chocolate coated honeycomb bar

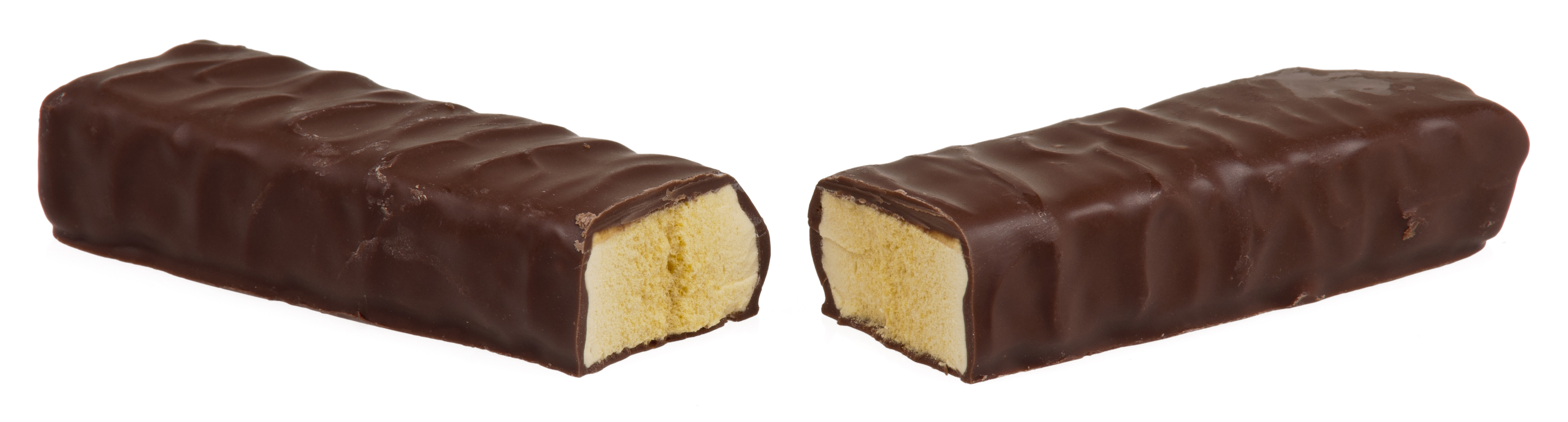
- Product type: Chocolate bar
- Current owner: Robern Menz
- Produced by: Robern Menz
- Country: Australia
- Introduced: 1913
- Previous owners: Nestlé; Hoadley's
- Website: violetcrumble.com.au

Violet Crumble is an Australian chocolate bar. The bar is a crumbly honeycomb toffee centre coated in a layer of compound chocolate. It was first made by Hoadley's Chocolates in South Melbourne around the year 1913; and is currently made in Adelaide, South Australia by Robern Menz after a period of ownership by Nestlé. Its advertising slogan is "It's the way it shatters that matters", and previously was "Nothing else matters". The bar shares similarities to the Crunchie bar made by British firm Cadbury. Aside from Australia, it is available in the city of Hong Kong, the US state of Hawaii, and in Mollie Stone's Markets, Cost Plus World Market, Five Below, and Ralphs within the United States.

== History ==
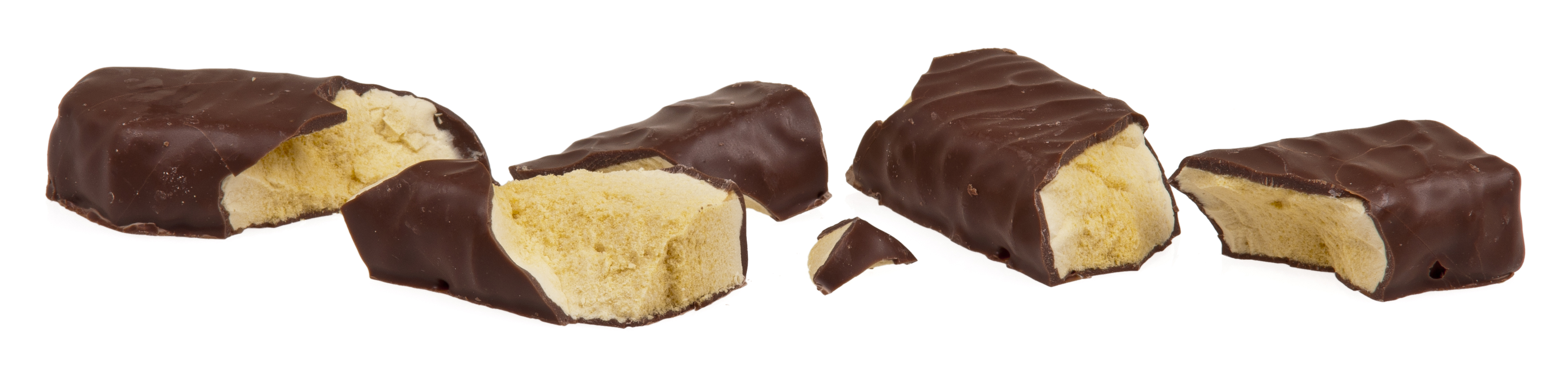
A Violet Crumble shown shattered after hitting a hard surface

Abel Hoadley opened a jam factory in South Melbourne, in 1889, trading as A. Hoadley & Company. By 1895, business had expanded rapidly and Hoadley built a five-storey premises, the Rising Sun Preserving Works. He produced jams, jellies, fruit preserves, candied peels, sauces, and confectionery and employed a workforce as large as 200. By 1901, there were four preserving factories and a large confectionery works. Hoadley had acquired the firm of Dillon, Burrows & Co and extended his products to vinegar, cocoa, and chocolate. In 1910, the jam business was sold to Henry Jones Co-operative and in 1913, Hoadley's Chocolates was formed.

The same year, Hoadley produced his first chocolate assortment and packed them in a purple box decorated with violets, in tribute to his wife's favourite colour and flower. Within the box assortment was a piece of honeycomb that became so popular that Hoadley decided to produce an individual honeycomb bar.

This proved trickier than first thought because, as the pieces of honeycomb cooled, they absorbed moisture and started sticking together. This hygroscopic nature of honeycomb led Hoadley to eventually dip his bars in chocolate, to keep the honeycomb dry and crunchy, creating the Violet Crumble bar in 1913.

Hoadley wanted to name the bar "Crumble," but the name could not be trademarked. He instead chose "Violet Crumble," reportedly after his wife's favorite flower. The original packaging featured a purple wrapper with a small flower logo. Violet Crumbles have a crispier texture than Crunchie bars.

Hoadley's Chocolates was acquired by English company Rowntree's in 1970, which produced Violet Crumble in Adelaide until 1985. Rowntree's was acquired in 1988 by Nestlé, which moved production to the northern Melbourne suburb of Campbellfield.

On 11 January 2018, Robern Menz purchased the Violet Crumble brand and its associated intellectual property, plant and equipment for an undisclosed sum, and production restarted on 10 October 2018.

=== Timeline ===
- 1913, Hoadley's Chocolates made the first Violet Crumble bar in Melbourne.
- 1972, Hoadley's Chocolates was acquired by Rowntree's and became known as Rowntree Hoadley Ltd.
- 1989, Nestlé acquired Rowntree's. The Rowntree chocolate brands were initially branded as Nestlé-Rowntree until Nestlé dropped "Rowntree".
- 2009, Nestlé changed the shape of the Violet Crumble to a wider, flatter bar. The honeycomb formulation was also changed to make it shatter into small pieces when bitten into.
- 2010, Nestlé included the popular Violet Crumble “bags” product (not the bars) on their list of deleted products
- 2012, an attempt at regaining name and recipe rights for the Violet Crumble was made by young entrepreneur Bryan Hoadley, a descendant of Abel Hoadley.
- 2018, in January Robern Menz announced their plans to acquire the rights and equipment to take over production and commenced production in October.
- 2019, in March bags of Violet Crumble went on sale, for the first time in nine years, in independent grocery stores such as IGA.

=== Packaging ===
The hygroscopic nature of the honeycomb centre was problematic. Competitors tried to prove the bars were not fresh by squeezing them. Hoadley responded by instituting a strict coding system to keep track of the shelf life (12 months) and ensure that deteriorated bars were not sold. He also searched worldwide for a new type of airtight wrapper that would keep the bar fresh. Eventually French company La Cellophane invented a moisture-resistant metallised cellophane especially for Violet Crumble.

== Production ==
The honeycomb is produced and conveyed into an air-conditioned area where it is cut into bars, then goes through chocolate-coating machines. The bars are double-coated to seal the honeycomb from the air. Cooling tunnels take the bars to the automatic wrapping machines.

Bertie Beetle, a small chocolate bar sold at stores and shows around Australia, was introduced in 1963 to use up broken pieces of Violet Crumble.

== See also ==
- List of chocolate bar brands
- List of confectionery brands
