= Crunchie =

British chocolate bar made by Cadbury

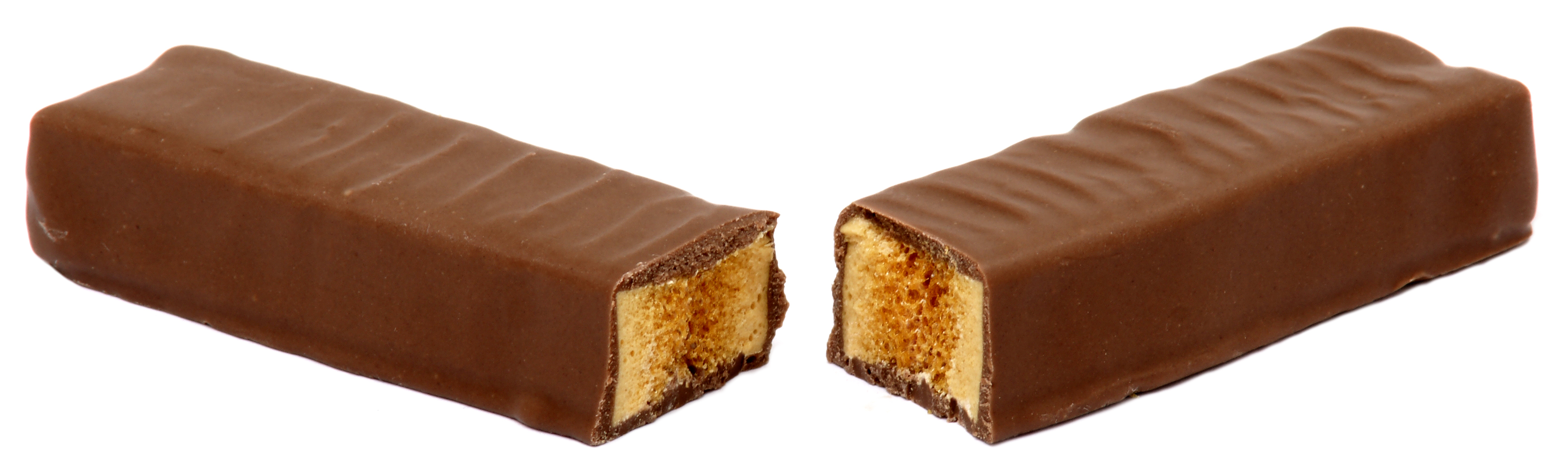
- Product type: Confectionery
- Current owner: Cadbury
- Country: United Kingdom
- Introduced: 1929; 97 years ago

Crunchie is a brand of chocolate bar with a centre of honeycomb/cinder toffee, (Note: Known as "sponge toffee" in Canada as well as "hokey pokey" in New Zealand.) manufactured by British confectionery company Cadbury, currently produced in Poland. It was originally launched by J. S. Fry & Sons in 1929; a very similar product named Violet Crumble was already invented in Australia in 1913. The Crunchie bar is widely available in several countries around the world and has also been grey imported elsewhere.

== Manufacture ==
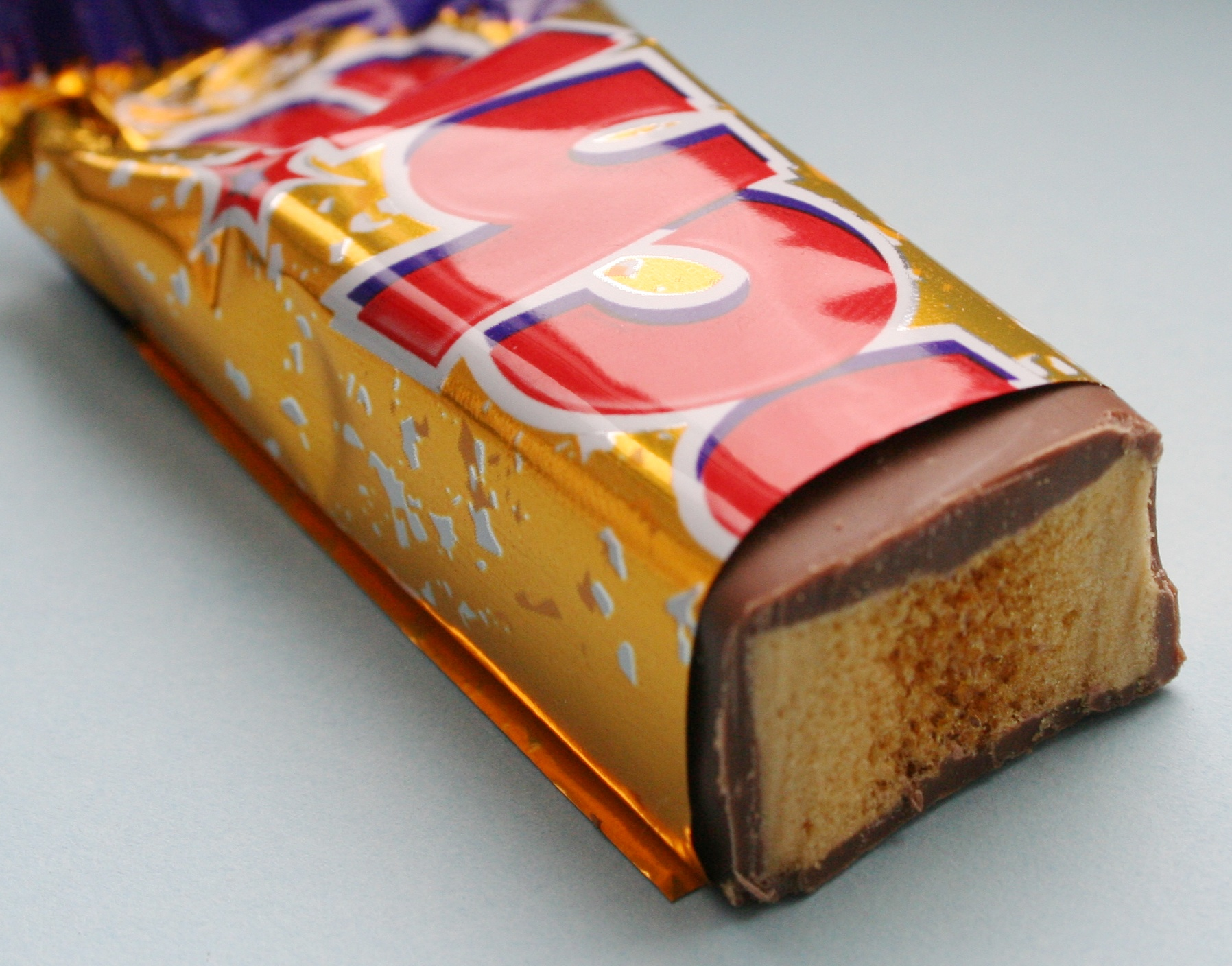
A close-up of the bar's honeycomb centre

During manufacture, the honeycomb toffee is produced in large slabs, and is cut up using a highly focused jet of oil, though in Canada rotary saws are used. The use of a blade would lead to fragmentation, while water would dissolve the honeycomb. Oil prevents both of these happening, and produces uniform sharp-edged portions. The honeycomb toffee is then covered with chocolate, cooled, and packaged.

Until September 2010 Crunchie was produced in England at the Somerdale Factory plant in Keynsham; however, production then transferred to Cadbury's new plant in Skarbimierz-Osiedle, Poland.

In 2025, Mondelēz International teamed up with Tesco to trial new Cadbury Crunchie multipack packaging that, it claims, will reduce the outer plastic by 60% per pack. The new packaging will be implemented on approximately 1.8 million Cadbury Crunchie four-bar multipacks sold in Tesco stores until early 2026.

== Size ==
The Crunchie is sold in several sizes, ranging from "snack size" – a small rectangle – to "king size". The most common portion is a single-serve bar, about 1 inch wide by about 7 inches long, and about 3/4 inch deep (2.5 cm × 18 cm × 2 cm).

== Variations ==
Like other chocolate brands, Crunchie brand ice cream bars and cheesecake are also sold in some countries. Such products contain nuggets of the honeycomb.

Name	Launched	Discontinued	Notes
Cadbury's Crunchie Orange	1997	1997	A variant with Orange-flavoured milk chocolate. Limited Edition offering.
Cadbury's Crunchie Mint	1998; 2000; 2002	1998; 2000; 2002	A variant with Mint-flavoured milk chocolate. A limited Edition offering that was sold for many years.
Cadbury's Crunchie Explosion	1999	1999	A variant with popping candy pieces. Limited Edition offering.
Cadbury's Crunchie Champagne	1999	2000	A variant with champagne-flavoured milk chocolate. Limited Edition offering for the millennium.
Cadbury's Crunchie Tango Orange	2000	early-2000's	A variant with Tango Orange-flavoured milk chocolate. It was created as a collaberation between Cadbury and Britvic.
Cadbury's Crunchie Lemonade	2000	2001	A variant with Lemonade-flavoured chocolate. Limited edition offering.
Cadbury Crunchie Blast	2005	2006	A version of Crunchie with popping candy pieces inside the bar. While the bar was only sold for a limited time, an ice cream of the same name, which is Magnum-shaped honeycomb ice cream with popping candy covered in milk chocolate, has been sold by Cadbury in the British and Irish markets.
Cadbury Crunchie Rocks	2010	Present	A bagged variant featuring a mixture of chocolate, cornflake and Crunchie.
Cadbury Crunchie Duo	2026	Present	A variant of the regular Crunchie featuring two smaller pieces of chocolate inside a larger wrapper.

== Nutrition information ==
Average values	British Crunchie		Australian Crunchie	
Average values	Per 100 g	Per 40 g bar	Per 100 g	Per 50 g bar
Energy (kJ)	2020	775	1950	975
Energy (kCal)	465	185		
Protein	3.0 g	1.6 g	1.5	<1.0
Carbohydrate	73.5 g	27.8 g	80.5	40.2
Fat	18.4 g	7.6 g	14.8	7.4

== Advertising ==
In Australia and New Zealand, Crunchie bars are widely known for having New Zealand's longest-running television advertisement, the "Crunchie Train Robbery" which won many awards and ran in unchanged form for over 20 years from the late 1970s.

Crunchie has been advertised in Britain and Ireland since the 1980s with the slogan "Get that Friday feeling". Prior to the 1980s, Crunchie was advertised as "Crunchie makes exciting biting". In 1991, Cadbury launched a TV ad campaign that made use of The Pointer Sisters song, "I'm So Excited", which became one of the longest running advert campaigns in television history, continuing to be used up until 2008. These ads were animated and produced by Aardman Animations.

== Literary references ==
The Crunchie bar is mentioned in Enid Bagnold's 1935 novel National Velvet, as the Brown sisters' sweet of choice for the year.

Stuart buys Bertie a mint Crunchie bar in the 44 Scotland Street book The Importance Of Being Seven by Alexander McCall Smith.

== See also ==
- Violet Crumble
- List of chocolate bar brands
- List of confectionery brands
