= Exhibition line =

Special-purpose railway line in Brisbane

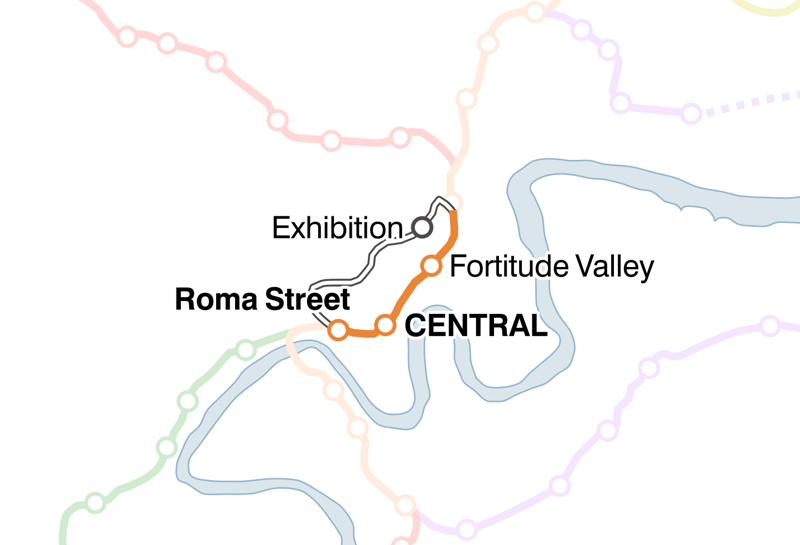

Overview
- Website: queenslandrail.com.au

Technical
- Track length: 3.4 km (2.1 mi)
- Track gauge: 1,067 mm (3 ft 6 in)
- Electrification: 1982

The EX Exhibition line (also known as the Ekka loop line) is a railway line in Brisbane, the state capital of Queensland, Australia. It conveyes Queensland Rail City network passengers between city stations (Roma Street, Central and Fortitude Valley) and Exhibition station during the Royal Queensland Show (locally known as "the Ekka") in August and during other special events.

In 2023, parts of the line were realigned and absorbed into the Cross River Rail project in what was described as one of the longest and most complicated pieces of track work ever undertaken in South East Queensland.

== History ==
When the Roma St to Sandgate railway opened in 1882, it had been constructed via Normanby to avoid the need for land resumptions through the Brisbane CBD. When passenger trains were diverted to the new line via Central station in 1890, traffic diminished significantly, and the section between Exhibition station and Mayne along with Normanby station was closed in 1900.

In 2023, parts of the line were realigned and absorbed into the Cross River Rail project in what was described as one of the longest and most complicated pieces of track work ever undertaken in South East Queensland.
