= George Peacock (manufacturer) =

Australian businessman

George Peacock (1824–1900) was an Australian businessman, best known for his association with the production of tinned jams made with fruit grown in Tasmania.

Peacock was born in Bath, Somerset. He arrived in Hobart in 1850. By the mid-1870s, Hobart was the jam-making centre of the Australian colonies. Peacock's factory in Hobart manufactured jam from fruit shipped from the Huon Valley.

In 1880 Peacock moved to Sydney, and continued his business again making jam from fruit sourced from Tasmania. In 1891 he retired. The Hobart-based jam-making business was taken over by his son Ernest, business associate A. W. Palfreyman, and Henry Jones. He died in Petersham, New South Wales.
