= Charles Hoadley =

Australian geologist (1887–1947)

Charles Hoadley CBE
- In the Antarctic
- Born: 1 March 1887; Burwood, Melbourne, Victoria
- Died: 27 February 1947 (aged 59); Footscray, Melbourne, Victoria
- Citizenship: Australian
- Education: Toorak Grammar School; Wesley College
- Alma mater: University of Melbourne
- Known for: Australasian Antarctic Expedition; Australian Scouting leader
- Spouse: Rita Cadle McComb (m. 1932)
- Children: 2
- Parents: Abel Hoadley (father); Susannah Ann née Barrett (mother)
- Awards: Polar Medal
- Scientific career
- Fields: Geology
- Institutions: Ballarat School of Mines

Charles Archibald Brookes Hoadley CBE (1 March 1887 – 27 February 1947) was an Australian geologist, and leader in the Victorian branch of the Australian Scouting movement.

== Early life and education ==
Hoadley was born in Burwood, Melbourne, Victoria, on 1 March 1887, the son of Abel Hoadley and his wife Susannah Ann née Barrett, he was the tenth of their fourteen children. He attended Toorak Grammar School, and from 1900, Wesley College. He graduated from the University of Melbourne in 1911 with a degree in mining engineering.

== Career ==
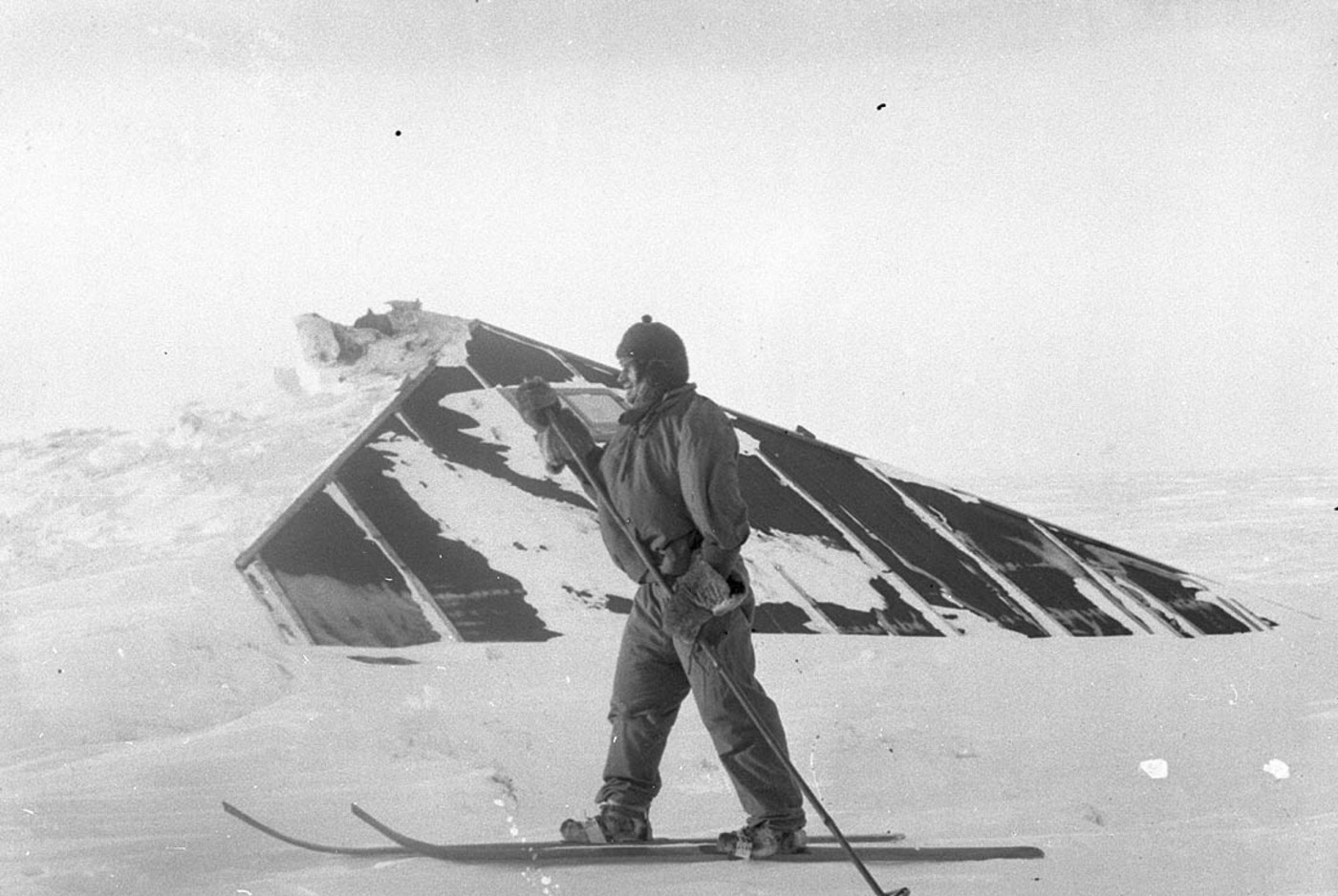
Hoadley on ski at 'The Grottoes' (Australasian Antarctic Expedition 1911-1914)

Hoadley was a member of the Australasian Antarctic Expedition led by Sir Douglas Mawson from 1911 to 1914. As a member of the Western Base Party, as well as his geological activities, Hoadley was involved with building the party’s hut, cooking, baking bread and taking part in a number of sledging parties. Cape Hoadley was named in his honour upon discovery by the exploration party.

From 1914 to 1916 he lectured in engineering at Ballarat School of Mines, before becoming the Principal at the Footscray Technical School, a post he held until his death in 1947.

== Scouting ==
In 1909, he founded one of the first Australian Scout groups, located in Footscray, Melbourne. He was Chief Commissioner of the Victorian Branch of the Scout Association from 1927 to 1937, where his major achievement was the creation of Counties to take administrative duties away from Branch Headquarters. He was better known as founder and from 1924 until his death in 1947 as Warden of Gilwell Park, Gembrook and a key part of Leader training, being one of the state's two first Deputy Camp Chiefs – authorised to award Scout Leaders with the Wood Badge.

In 1952 the new Senior Scout competition hike was named in his honour. The former Hoadley Scout Region in western Melbourne was also named after him. He was awarded the Silver Wolf Award in 1931.

== Personal life ==
On 21 May 1932, he married Rita Cadle McComb at Holy Trinity, Kew. They had two children. Hoadley died from coronary thrombosis in his Footscray home on 27 February 1947.

== Honours and awards ==
- 1913: Caroline Kay Scholarship and Government Research Scholarship in geology
- 1915: Polar Medal (Silver, Antarctic, 1912-14)
- 1931: Silver Wolf Award
- 1936: Commander of the Order of the British Empire (CBE)

== See also ==
- Kariwara District Scout Headquarters
