= Showbag =

Themed bag of items often sold at Australian agricultural shows

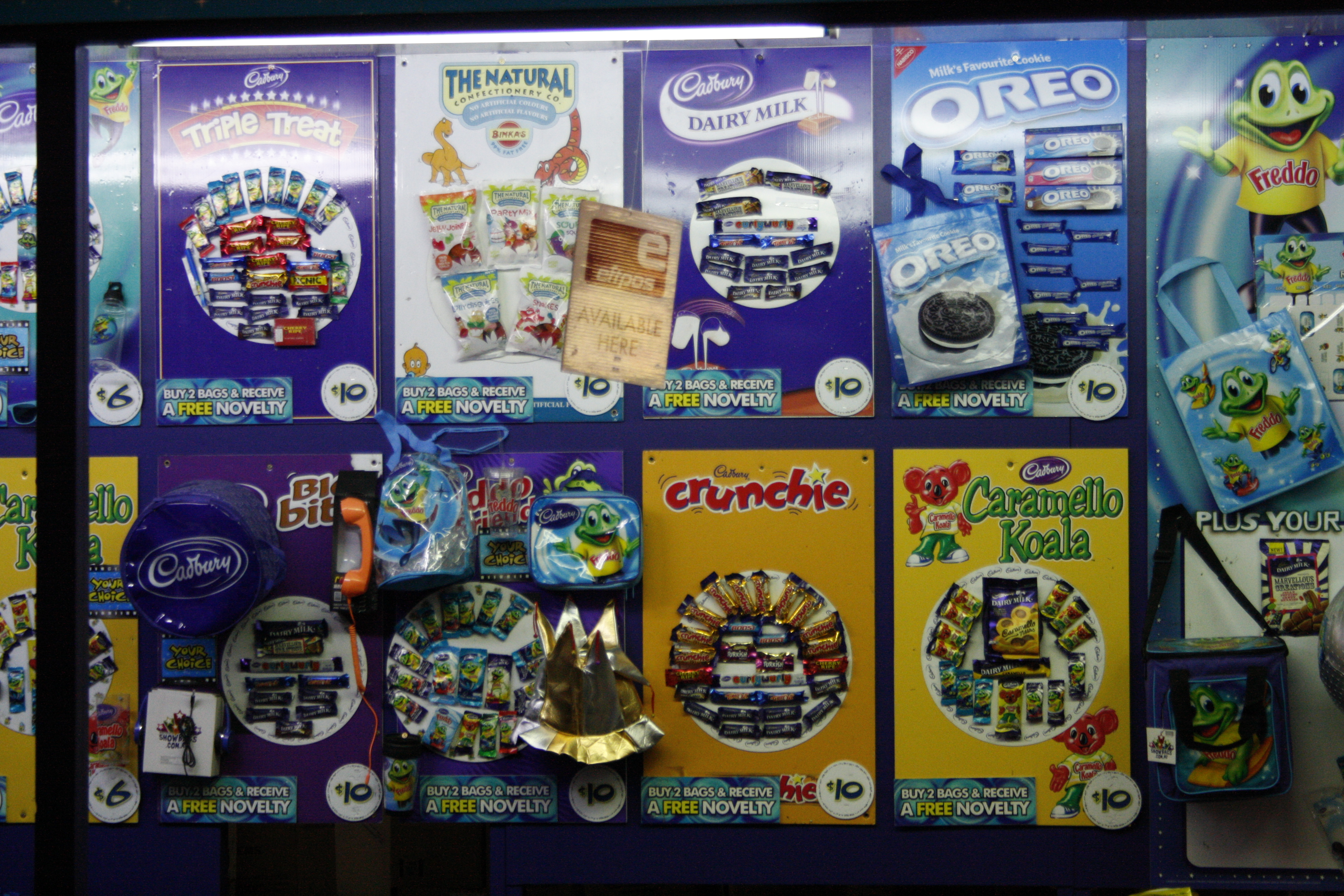
Showbags and their contents on display at Queensland's Ekka in 2013

A showbag is a themed bag of commercial products, novelty items and promotional merchandise, usually made available for purchase. It is a distinctive feature of Australian agricultural shows (the Australian equivalent of state fairs or travelling carnivals), where they are sold from stalls; they can also be found at exhibitions, festivals and fundraising events. Showbags are unique to Australia.

== History ==
Showbags were once known as "sample bags" as they originally contained product samples of household goods such as soap or canned foods, produced by a single vendor or a group of vendors. Such sample bags were originally given away free of charge or carried only a nominal price in order to promote brand awareness.

The first "showbag", a bag of coal, was given away for free to all visitors at the inaugural Brisbane Ekka in 1876; however, only from 1902 were stallholders allowed to start giving out samples. An IXL sample bag from 1933 contained tomato sauce, canned fruits, baked beans or spaghetti in a can and a ruler, all for 9 pence ($3.90 in 2020); this allowed families during the Great Depression to fill up their pantries for very little. Visitors at the 1954 Sydney Royal Easter Show could buy a Planters sample bag containing potato chips, potato straws, peanuts, toffee, honeycomb and a lollipop for 3 shillings ($5.36 in 2020). Toys would sometimes be included in the sample bags, but often they would be secondary to the product samples.

By the 1970s, the sample bag had evolved into the confectionary and merchandise-filled showbags known today.

== Pricing and contents ==
Compared to the practice of giving away sample bags for free or at very low cost in the past, showbags in the late-2010s were commonly priced between $5 and $30, up from a typical maximum of $20 during the previous decade. A showbag containing premium products can cost a hundred dollars or more, while the classic Bertie Beetle showbag has been sold for $2 for more than three decades. In 2008, a $10,000 "showbag" containing a freezer of beef and a fridge with 100 bottles of beer was offered at the Royal Melbourne Show. The rising cost of showbags is often identified as a major negative aspect of shows. Despite this, it is generally assumed that the total retail value of the individual contents of a showbag will exceed the price charged for the package.

Most showbags are marketed towards children, containing toys, sweets and chocolate. Other common showbag items include clothing such as hats, socks and T-shirts, backpacks, drinking cups and mugs, posters and stationery. Comic books were frequently included in showbags in the 1970s and 1980s, but the practice has declined since. A number of showbags are marketed to the adult consumer, with themes including cosmetics, fashion, fitness and health, premium confectionery and gourmet food, and even adult toys. Showbags themed around movies such as Ghostbusters, Top Gun, or Back to the Future, or television shows such as The Simpsons, The Big Bang Theory, Friends or The Office are generally targeted at adult fans of those properties. An adult marketed showbag may also include discount vouchers that can be redeemed at the vendor's business at a later date. Showbags often contain exclusive merchandise and items; Nestlé's Bertie Beetle chocolate bar was generally only available to the public in a showbag from the 1970s to 2018.

Common themes for showbags include confectionery brands such as Cadbury or Chupa Chups, children's toy brands such as Barbie or Hot Wheels, and licensed properties such as Disney, Star Wars, Pokémon, Harry Potter, or DC and Marvel Comics superheroes. Broad areas of children's play interest such as fairies, dinosaurs or pirates are also common subjects for showbag themes, as well as international and domestic sporting teams. Showbags may also be created to cash in on current fads and trends, as well as to promote recently released movies or television series. Others take on vague generic themes such as extreme sports, teen culture or practical jokes. The 2008 Royal Melbourne Show had a David Hasselhoff-themed showbag offered for sale.

The physical showbag itself is similar to a shopping bag and is usually made from plastic or heavy paper, and is printed with graphics promoting the theme or brand. Sometimes a backpack or tote bag may be used to hold the items instead, especially if such a bag is part of the showbag's contents.

== Distribution and sales ==
Major showbag companies operating today include Bensons Trading and Hunter Leisure as well as other smaller companies. Modern showbag companies seek out or are approached by established brands or vendors to create a branded showbag, or come up with a generic theme independently. The company then sources the contents of the showbag on its own, sometimes designing the included merchandise themselves. Assembly of the showbag is often done by a third party before final distribution to the show or event, where they are usually sold directly to the consumer by the showbag company. Before sale to the public, the contents of a showbag come under the scrutiny of state government product safety inspectors, who review the contents of the bag and remove potentially dangerous items such as those that could cause eye injury or have small parts that could pose a choking hazard to children.

In 1971 the Sydney Royal Easter Show offered a selection of only around 30 different showbags; in 2012 there were 342 varieties for sale. A major showbag company could expect to sell up to 500,000 showbags each year at the Royal Melbourne Show alone. At the 2017 Brisbane Ekka, more than 250,000 Bertie Beetle showbags were sold. Showbags were typically only available to people attending the shows, which in most places were only held once a year; however in the late-2010s showbags began to be sold online by showbag companies throughout the year and can be delivered directly to a customer's home, even internationally.

Due to the COVID-19 pandemic cancelling many agricultural shows in Australia during 2020 and 2021, online retailers of showbags have reported a boom in trade, though online sales of showbags still lagged far behind those sold at shows in previous years. Atypically, showbags were also sold in supermarkets and other brick and mortar stores after the cancellation of major shows in order to deal with the large surplus of stock. The pandemic also forced smaller showbag sellers in regional areas to tour country towns independently in order to continue trading.

After children aged 5 to 11 became eligible for COVID-19 vaccines in January 2022, state vaccination hubs in Victoria gave out showbags to children receiving their COVID-19 vaccination.
