= Brushwood =

Brushwood can mean:

- Brian Brushwood, American magician, podcaster, author and comedian known for Scam School
- Brushwood, New South Wales, a rural community in the central east part of the Riverina region of New South Wales, Australia
- Brushwood Junior School in the town of Chesham, Buckinghamshire, England
- Melaleuca uncinata, commonly known as brushwood or broombrush, a plant in the paperbark family native to southern Australia
- Operation Brushwood, a part of Operation Torch, Allied landings in Africa during World War II

== See also ==
- Shiba Inu, a breed of dog also known as the Japanese brushwood dog
