= White Knight (chocolate bar) =

Confectionery bar made by Nestlé

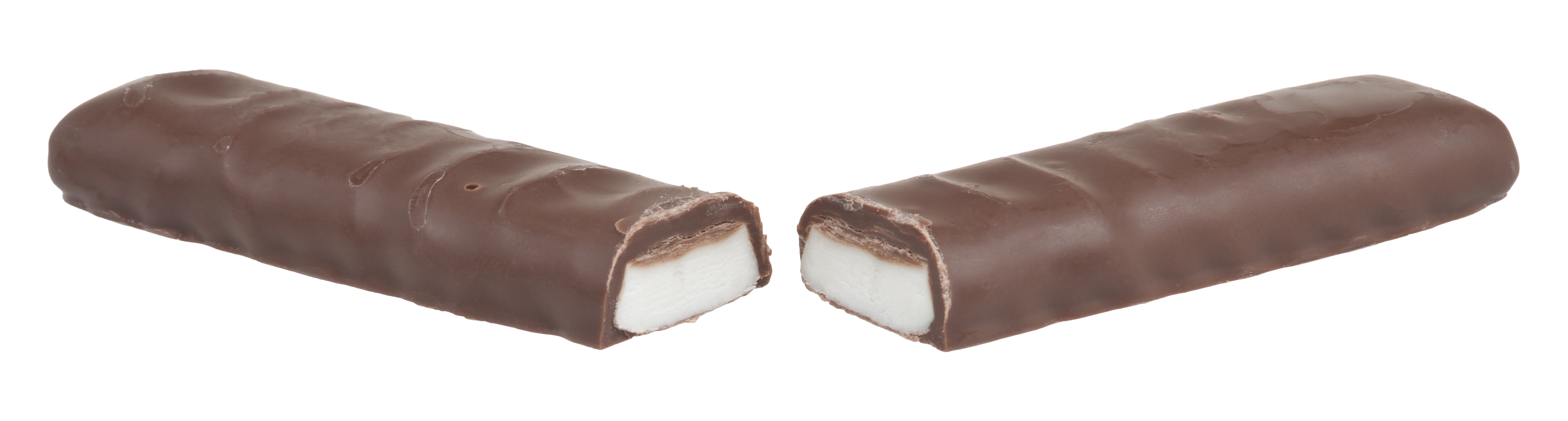
- Product type: Chocolate
- Current owner: Nestlé
- Country: Australia
- Discontinued: 2016; 10 years ago
- Previous owners: Hoadley's

White Knight is a brand of chocolate-coated, chewy, mint-flavoured confectionery bar sold in Australia. Originally produced by Hoadley's Chocolates it was later manufactured by Nestlé Australia. The packaging is blue and white and features a picture of a knight on a horse. Its slogan is 'Mighty Mint Chew'. The product was discontinued in 2016.

== Description ==
The 25 gram bar is composed of a white, mint flavoured chewy centre coated in compound chocolate.

In the 1980s the bar used to lie on top of a piece of cardboard within the wrapper. On the reverse of the card was a picture of a fictional knight which could be bent at the base to stand up. Children would aim to trade and collect the set of these knights. This part of the packaging was discontinued years later, presumably as a cost-cutting measure.

It was once sold across all major Australian supermarkets as well as some discount department stores (e.g. Kmart) and milk bars/convenience stores but as of 2014 was stocked only at Woolworths and Coles supermarkets and some specialty confectionery stores. The 25g bar was sold at a cheaper price point reflecting its smaller size (e.g. 75c in 2008) but in early 2010 its price was raised similar to the larger (50–60 g) sized chocolate bars (90c at Coles/Woolworths/Kmart).

The production of White Knight was discontinued by Nestlé Australia around 2016.

Ingredients:
Sugar, glucose syrup (derived from wheat or corn), vegetable fat, milk solids, cocoa, gelatine, emulsifiers (soya lecithin, 492) peppermint oil, salt, flavours, colour (133)

Nutritional information:
Serving size: 25 g (one bar)

Average quantity per serving:
Energy 460 kilojoules (110,000 cal), protein 0.5 g, fat (total) 3.1 g (saturated fat 2.9 g), carbohydrate 19.7 g (sugars 15.1 g), sodium 10 mg.

Average quantity per 100 g (Shown as per Australian food labelling standard):
Energy 1830 kJ, protein 1.9 g, fat (total) 12.2 g (saturated Fat 11.7 g), carbohydrate 78.7 g (sugars 60.4 g), sodium 40 mg.
