= SPC Australia =

Australian food manufacturer

SPC Global Limited
- Formerly: SPC Ardmona
- Predecessors: Shepparton Preserving Company; Ardmona
- Founded: 1917; 109 years ago
- Parent: SPC Global Limited (2019-current)

SPC Global Limited, formerly SPC Ardmona, is an Australian-based global agribusiness that specialises in food manufacturing, in particular large fruit processing and packing and owns and operates a factory in Shepparton and is one of the biggest employers in the Goulburn Valley region.

== History ==
=== 1917–2005: Founding to SPC Ardmona Merger ===
Started in 1917 by a group of fruit growers in Victoria's Goulburn Valley as a cooperative which they named the Shepparton Fruit Preserving Co. Ltd. The company began operations in February 1918, canning pears, peaches and nectarines under the brand name of SPC. SPC was incorporated as a public listed company in 1919, and Ardmona opened in 1921.

SPC Ardmona was formed in 2002 by the merger of the former Shepparton Preserving Company (SPC) and Ardmona.

=== 2005–2021: Acquisition by Coca-Cola Amatil and Financial Problems ===
SPC Ardmona was bought by Coca-Cola Amatil in 2005 for A$750 million. In that time, CCA had also invested about A$250 million in infrastructure, and the Victorian government had provided A$22 million in co-investment.

It acquired IXL and Taylors brands in 2004,.

However, under Coca-Cola Amatil ownership, the company faced significant financial struggles. SPCA closed its Mooroopna processing plant in 2011 and its Kyabram factory was sold in 2019.

In 2012, SPCA disposed $100 million of fruit bought under contract because it could not be sold, blaming it on "plummeting" local and export orders. A former Coca-Cola Asia executive, Peter Kelly, went to the company in April 2013 to attempt to turn it around.

SPC Ardmona lost $25 million in 2013, compared to a $70 million profit 8 years earlier. In October 2013, SPCA sought A$50 million financial assistance from the Federal and Victorian governments to modernise its operation. It wanted the Victorian Government to match the Federal grant. In early 2014, SPCA sought $25 million of Federal government assistance as part of a plan to upgrade the Shepparton cannery which was rejected. Shortly afterwards however, the Victorian Government announced that $22 million would be provided.

In November 2016, Woolworths ended its contract with SPCA for the supply of tinned tomatoes and would not renew it. However, the five-year deal to provide tinned fruit was ongoing.

=== 2019–2024: Ownership and Turnaround under Private Equity ===
In June 2019, it was announced that Coca-Cola Amatil had sold the SPC business to a consortium group, led by Hussein Rifai called Shepparton Partners Collective, now known as SPC Global Limited, for $40 million. Shepparton Partners Collective was a joint venture between Perma Funds Management, a boutique investment house, and The Eights, a private equity firm. The sale was subject to a four-year deferred payment which, subject to business performance, could generate a further $15 million for Coca-Cola on top of the money paid up-front. As part of the turnaround strategy, the business sold the IXL and Taylors brands with the Kyabram factory in 2019 to a group of farmers and growers in the Goulburn Valley.

In August 2021, SPC Global mandated COVID-19 vaccinations for all staff, contractors, and visitors becoming the first Australian company to mandate vaccines for all onsite staff and visitors.

In 2021, SPC introduced the manufacturing and distribution of healthy beverages through its new acquisitions of the brand, Helping Humans, and ready to eat meals through, the Kuisine Co. and The Good Meal Co.

In the 2020-21 Financial Year, SPC reported a consolidated profit after tax of A$11.8 million. In 2021-22 it returned a consolidated profit after tax of A$24 million.

Currently, Hussein Rifai is the Chairman of the company. From 2023-2024, Neil Brimacombe was CEO.

=== 2024–Current: Merger and relisting on the ASX under SPC Global ===
In 2024 SPC merged with the Original Juice Company and Nature One Dairy, under the new trading name SPC Global, with Robert Iervasi as Managing Director. Through a backdoor listing, SPC Global relisted on the ASX in December 2024 after a 20 year absence with the ticker of SPG.

SPC Global carries the SPC, Goulburn Valley, Ardmona, Provital, Pomlife and Helping Humans brands under its SPC business unit.

In its first H1 results announcement since relisting on the ASX, SPC Global announced a net loss after tax of A$23.9 million on A$197.9 million revenue. SPC generated A$139 million during the period.

== SPC Football Club ==
The SPC Football Club won the 1945 Goulburn Valley Football Association – Lightning Premiership which was held on the King's Birthday public holiday.

SPC were runners up to Shepparton East in the 1945 Goulburn Valley Football Association grand final.

SPC defeated Numurkah in the 1948 Central Goulburn Valley Football League's seconds grand final. and in 1949 SPC were defeated by Shepparton in the 1949 Central Goulburn Valley Football League's senior football grand final.

SPC merged with Shepparton East in 1950 to form City United, later named the Shepparton United Football Club and entered a senior team in Goulburn Valley Football League.

== SPC Brands ==
- SPC
- Ardmona
- Goulburn Valley
- SPC ProVital
- Street Eats
- Pomlife
- The Good Meal Co
- Nature One Dairy
- Original Juice Company
