= Brushwood, New South Wales =

Brushwood New South Wales
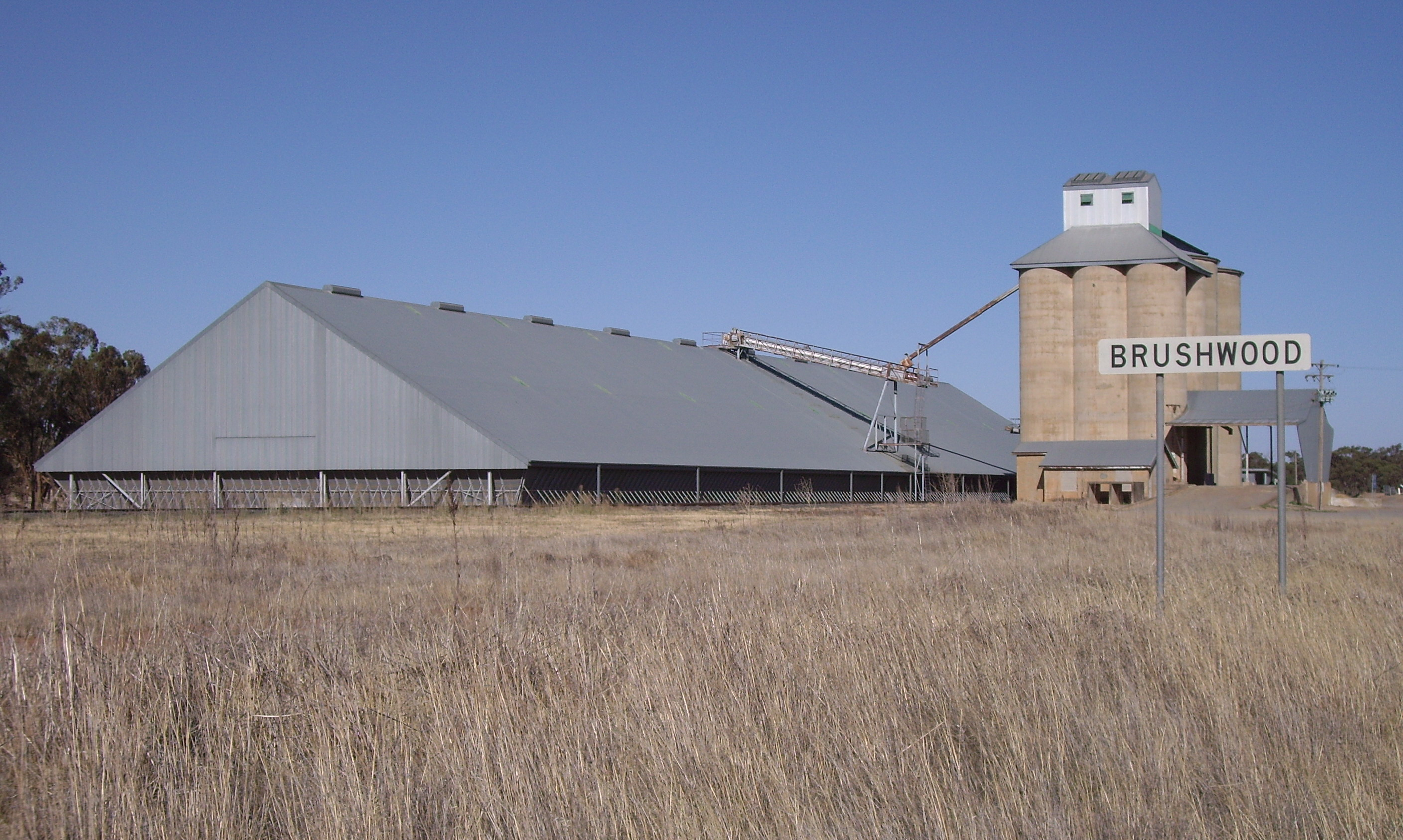
- Silos at Brushwood

- Coordinates: 34°48′S 147°06′E
- Location: 474 km (295 mi) SW of Sydney; 52 km (32 mi) NW of Wagga Wagga; 8 km (5 mi) W of Coolamon; 6 km (4 mi) W of Ganmain
- LGA(s): Coolamon Shire
- County: Bourke
- State electorate(s): Cootamundra
- Federal division(s): Division of Riverina

Brushwood is a rural community in the central east part of the Riverina region of New South Wales, Australia. It is situated by road about 6 kilometres (3.7 mi) east of Ganmain and 8 kilometres (5.0 mi) west of Coolamon.

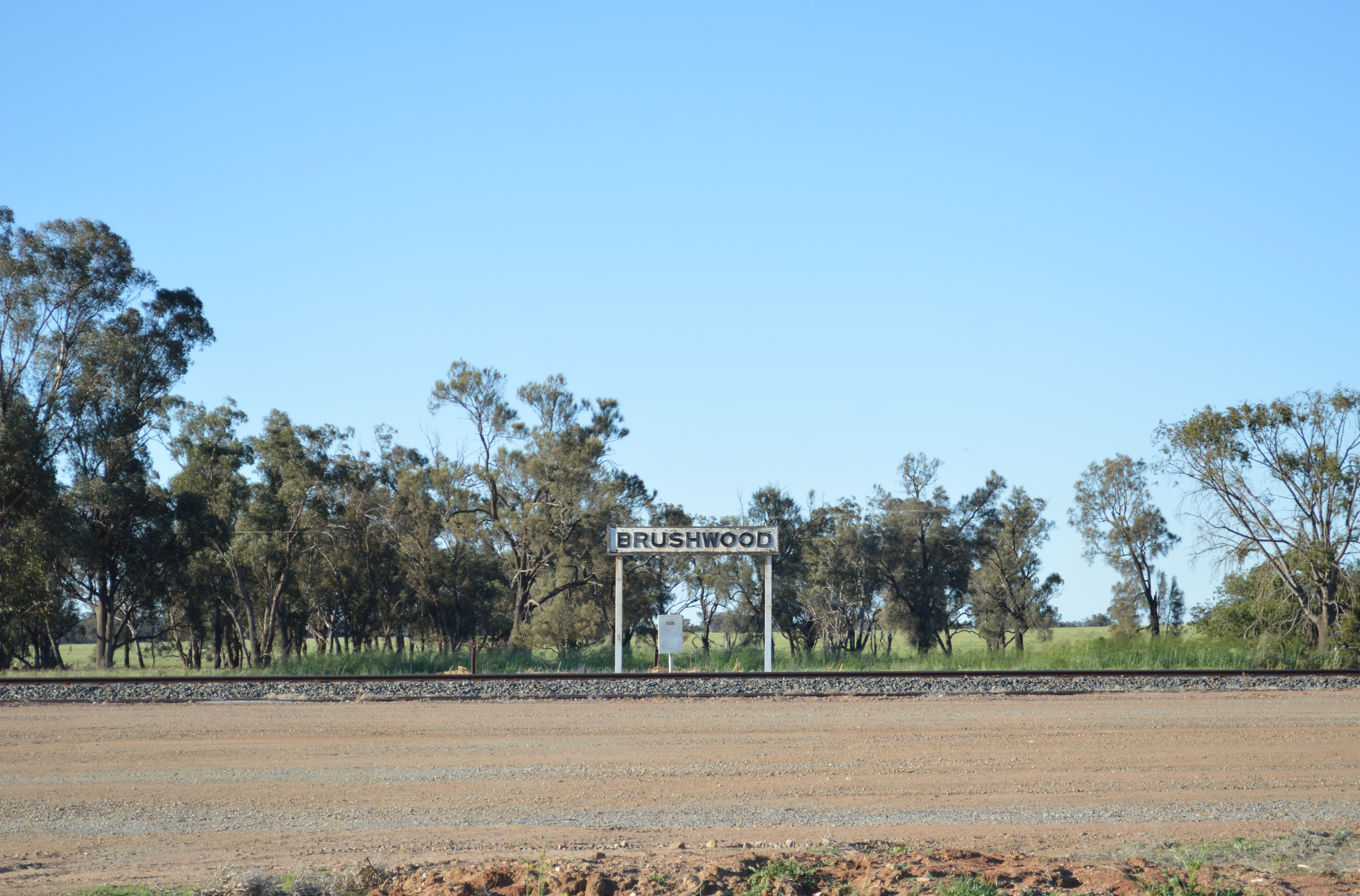
Brushwood Railway Station Sign

Brushwood lies within the wheat farming belt of the Coolamon Shire Council and is the home of a small railway station (for the uploading of wheat and other grains) and a series of large 30-metre (98 ft) silos.
