= Henry Jones (Australian businessman) =

Australian businessman

Caricature by David Low

Sir Henry Jones (19 July 1862 – 29 October 1926) was an Australian businessman of significance in the development of Tasmanian industry and trade.

== Career ==
Jones created the brand name IXL (an acronym signifying the words "I excel"). Jones was made foreman in 1885.

== Awards ==
Jones was knighted in the 1919 New Year Honours.

== Personal life ==
Henry Jones, born in Hobart, was the second son of John and Emma Jones. Jones died at Melbourne on 29 October 1926. He was survived by his wife Alice Glover - they had married in 1883 - as well as their three sons and nine daughters.

== See also ==
- The Jam Factory, Melbourne, Australia

== Bibliography ==
- Serle, Percival (1949). "Jones, Henry". Dictionary of Australian Biography. Sydney: Angus & Robertson.
