= Cocoa-free chocolate alternative =

Cocoa-free chocolate alternatives, also called cocoa alternatives or cacao-free alternatives, are chocolate alternatives that look, taste, and perform like chocolate but do not contain cocoa as an ingredient. Because of problems associated with the cocoa supply chain such as shortages and deforestation, chocolate alternatives without cocoa are a growing sector in the global chocolate industry.

== Sources ==
Cocoa-free chocolate alternatives come in many varieties, including milk, vegan, and white and dark "chocolate." The first innovator that introduced cocoa-free "chocolate" into the market was the German company Planet A Foods (maker of ChoViva and a cocoa butter alternative), followed by the UK-based Win-Win, the Finnish Fazer and the US-based company Voyage Foods. Many or most producers replace cocoa with carob. A few producers develop cocoa-free chocolate alternatives without carob, and use, for example, sunflower and oat seeds as a basis. Cocoa-free chocolate alternatives are legally not allowed to be labeled as chocolate, which requires a specified minimum proportion of cocoa mass, varying by country.

== Production process ==
The cocoa alternatives possess slightly different production processes, but are all based on the traditional chocolate production process. Oats and sunflower seeds undergo a similar treatment to cocoa beans and are then ground in several steps to get an aromatic concentrate. Afterwards, the concentrate is mixed with other ingredients, like sugar and plant-based fats, like palm and shea.

== History ==
Cocoa-reduced products were developed after World War II, when the cocoa market suffered from limited availability and consequent high prices. In recent years, the demand for cocoa-alternatives has started to grow as cocoa cultivation again undergoes shortages.
