= Ekka =

Annual Australian agricultural show

Royal Queensland Show Ekka
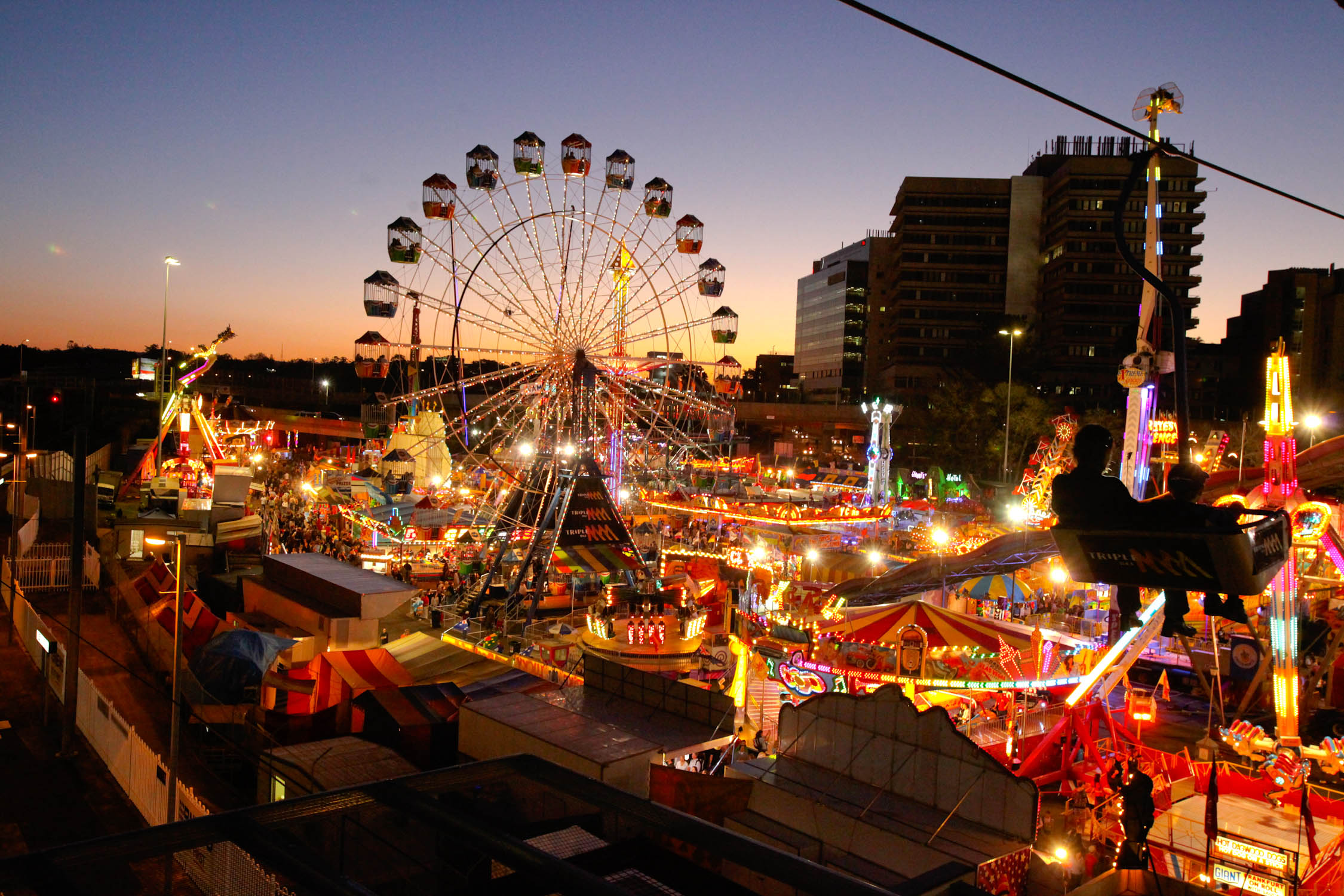
- Sideshow Alley viewed at dusk from the John MacDonald stand
- Genre: Agricultural show
- Frequency: Annual
- Locations: Brisbane Showgrounds, Australia
- Years active: 150
- Inaugurated: 22 August 1876
- Previous event: 8–16 August 2026
- Next event: 7–15 August 2027
- Attendance: ~400,000
- Organiser: The Royal National Agricultural and Industrial Association of Queensland (RNA)
- Website: www.ekka.com.au

The Ekka is the annual agricultural show of Queensland, Australia, first being held in 1876. Its formal title is the Royal Queensland Show, and it is held at the Brisbane Showgrounds. It was originally called the Brisbane Exhibition, but it is more commonly known as the Ekka, short for exhibition. It is run by The Royal National Agricultural and Industrial Association of Queensland (RNA).

The Ekka is Queensland's largest annual event, which welcomes an average of 400,000 visitors each August. The show welcomes 21,000 competition entries, 10,000 animals, and family entertainment, including a night program. The Ekka features a sideshow alley, showbag pavilion, and nightly fireworks displays.

The significance of the first exhibition held in 1876 was described by locals as the most important event since the separation of Queensland from New South Wales in 1859.

In 2009 as part of the Q150 celebrations, the Ekka was announced as one of the Q150 Icons of Queensland for its role as an "event and festival".

== History ==
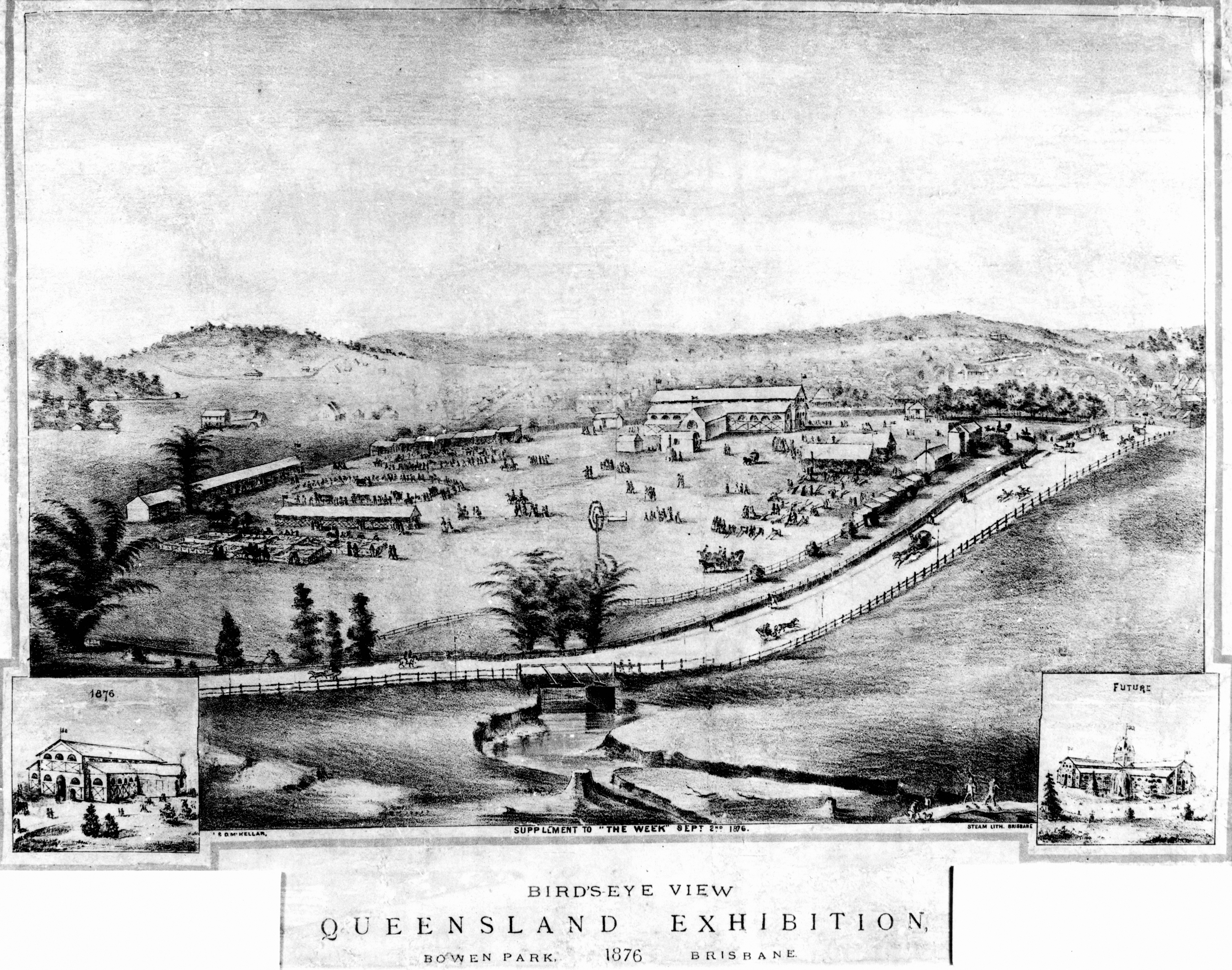
Bird's eye view of first Ekka (Queensland Exhibition), 1876

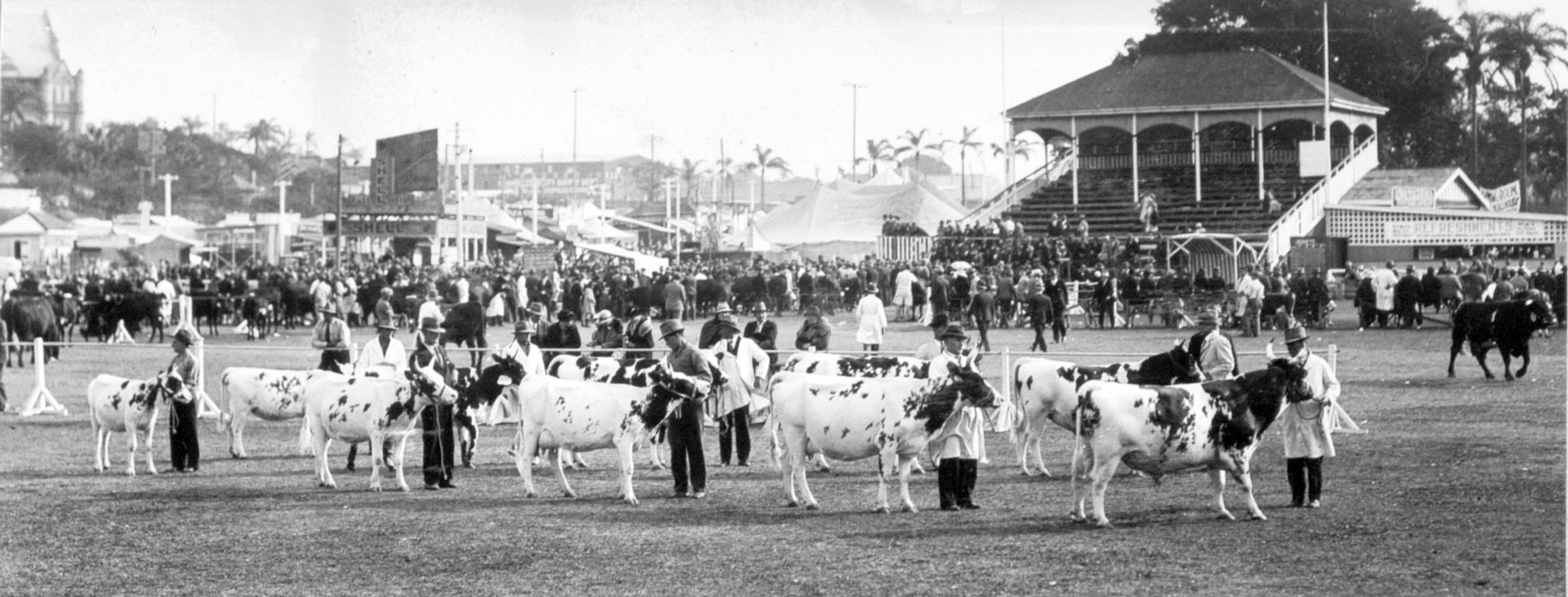
Grand parade of prize-winning animals,1935

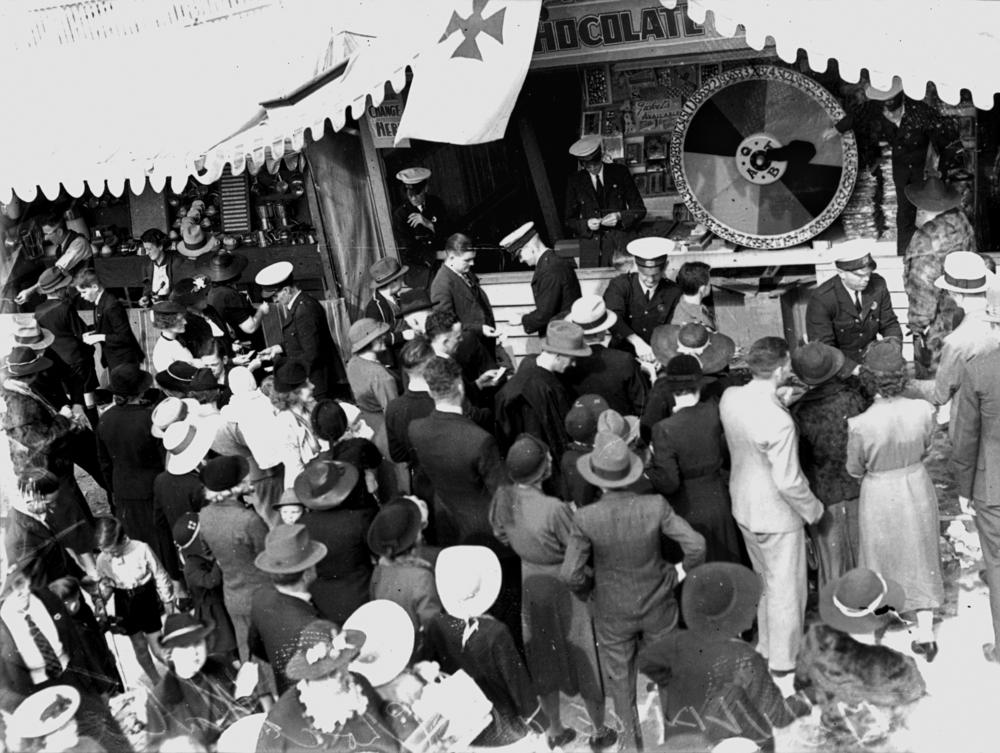
Chocolate Wheel at the Ambulance stall, Exhibition Ground, Brisbane, 1938.

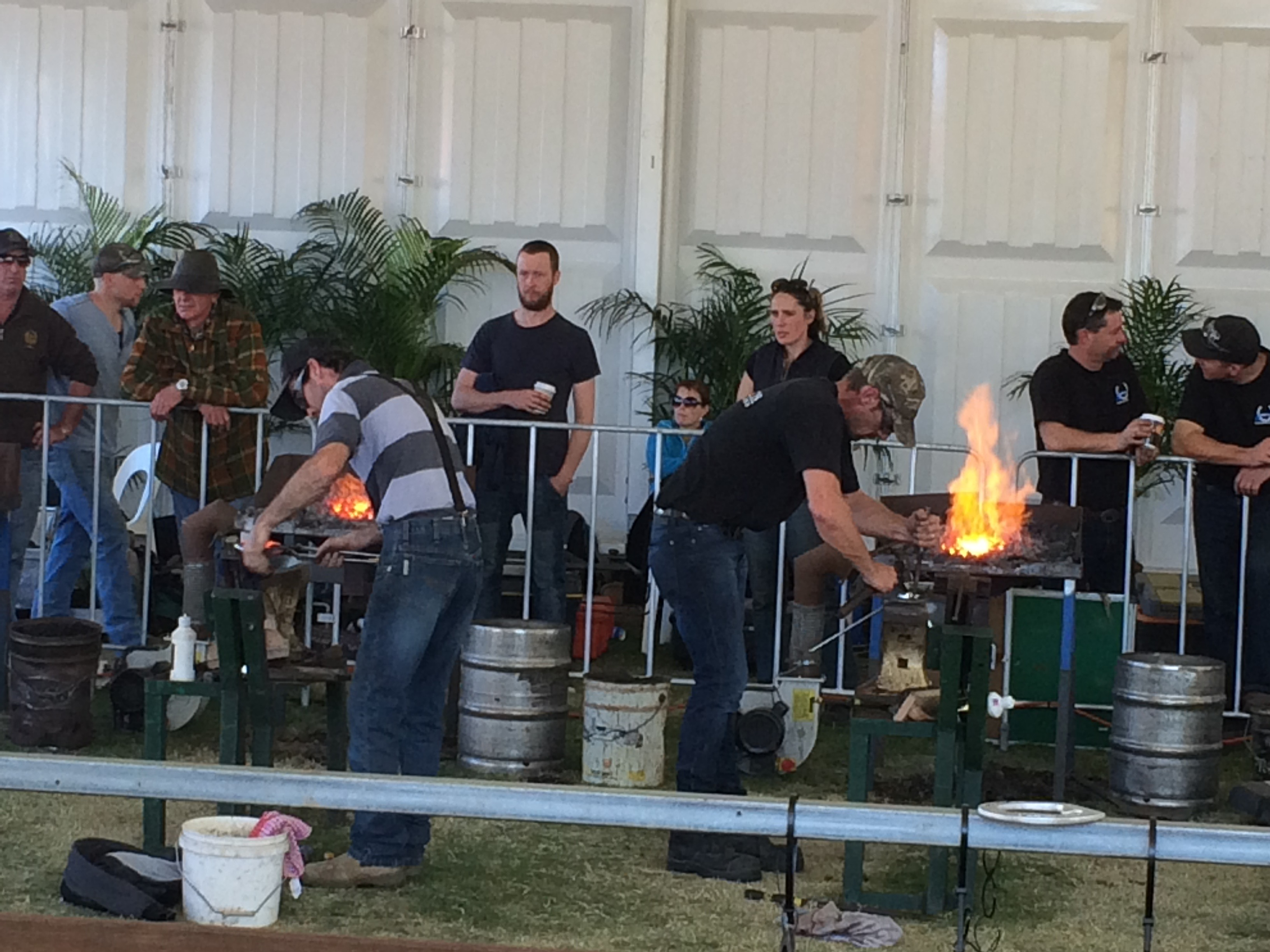
Farrier competition, Ekka, Brisbane, 2015

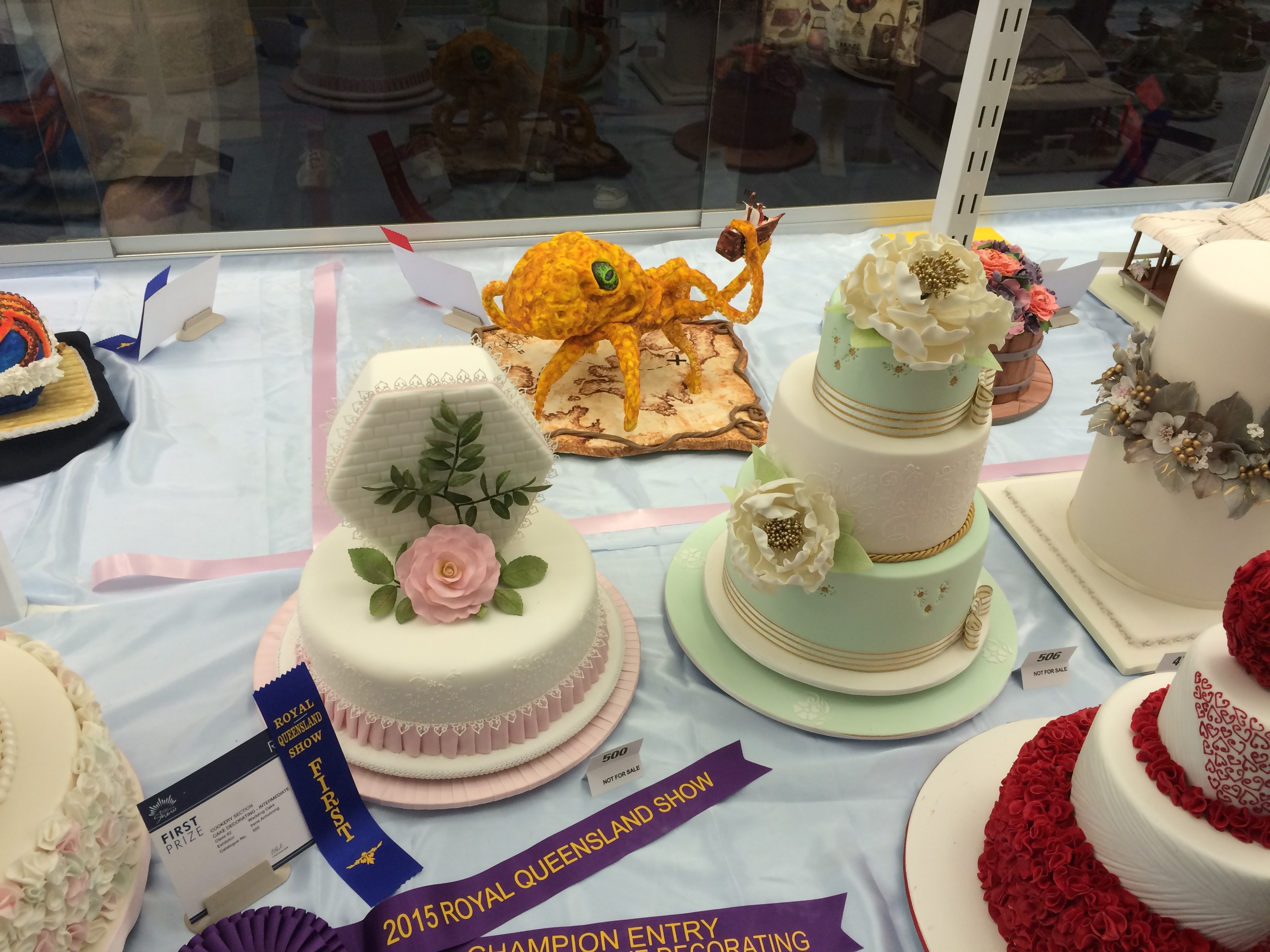
Cake decorating competition with traditional and novelty designs, Ekka, Brisbane, 2015

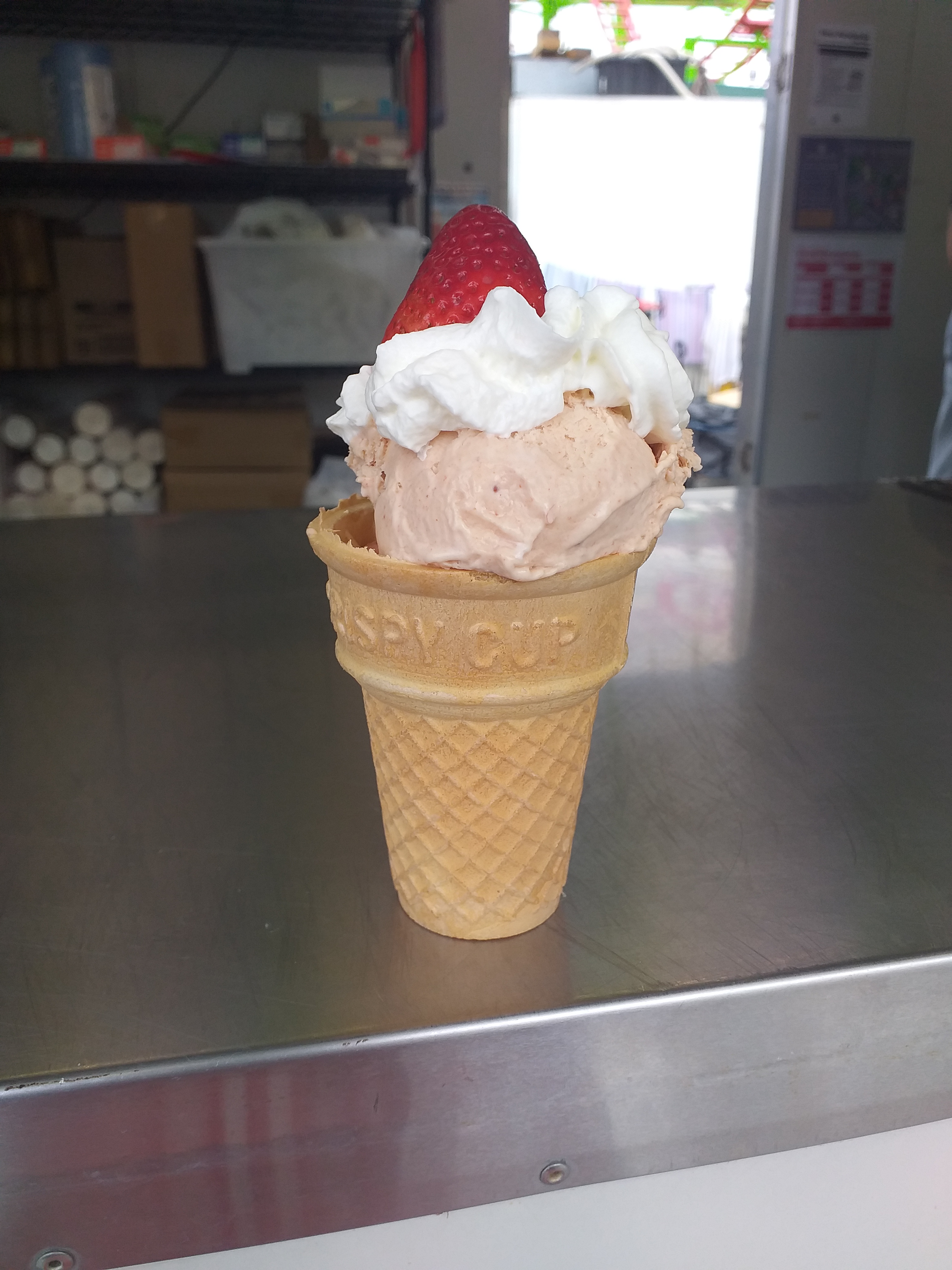
An Ekka strawberry sundae

The first show, held between 22 and 26 August 1876, attracted 17,000 visitors. The centrepiece of the grounds was the timber exhibition building which housed 1,700 individual exhibits in total. One of the first popular attractions was a timber bridge built by saw-miller William Pettigrew. All visitors to the show were given a free bag of coal; this is considered the first example of what would become the showbag. The show was a spin-off from the famous International Exhibitions being held in Britain and worldwide dating from the Crystal Palace Exhibition of 1851.

A new grandstand designed by Claude William Chambers was open for the 1906 show. It was later named the John Macdonald stand in recognition of a long-serving member of the Royal National Association. In 1920, the show was visited by the Prince of Wales (who later became King Edward VIII) who was asked and gave permission for the name of the association to change to the Royal National Agricultural and Industrial Association of Queensland.

During a time when the Ekka was still young, the main purpose of the agricultural show, as its name suggests, was to show off many agricultural and industrial exhibits. It was a chance for people to show off newly invented agricultural and industrial devices such as ultra modern ploughing, sowing and harvesting artefacts. Cattle and other farm animals were also exhibited during the show, a practice that remains to this day. The Animal Nursery, which has been running since 1964, features around 500 baby farmyard animals for visitors to meet and greet.

Every Ekka has been opened by the Governor of Queensland or the Governor-General with vice-regal involvement present throughout the whole event. This is a long tradition, with the first president of the RNA in 1875 being Governor Sir William Cairns.

Since its opening, the show has been cancelled four times, first in 1919 throughout the time of the Spanish flu pandemic, where the grounds were employed as temporary hospital wards for the sick, then in 1942, due to World War II. During the COVID-19 pandemic shows were cancelled in 2020 due to health concerns and again in 2021 as South East Queensland was then in lockdown. It is also planned to be cancelled in 2032 due to the Brisbane Olympics.

== Location ==
The Ekka is held in Queensland's capital city, Brisbane, for 10 days each August at the Brisbane Showgrounds in the suburb of Bowen Hills. The Ekka is run by the Royal National Agricultural and Industrial Association of Queensland (RNA). The Ekka is Brisbane's most popular event of any sort, with around 400,000 visitors attending the show in recent years.

The showgrounds covers an area of 22 hectares.

During Ekka, the Exhibition railway line is operational with special trains (some of them historic steam trains) carrying passengers to the Exhibition railway station in the middle of the Brisbane Showgrounds.

== Attractions ==
Attractions at the Ekka include fairground rides, a Side Show Alley, animal parades, woodchopping competitions, agricultural displays, petting pens, and equestrian events.

Showbags are also an integral part of the Ekka experience. Usually containing food items (such as confectionery and novelty items), showbags are sold in the Showbag Pavilion. The contents of the showbags are tested to ensure they comply with safety standards. In 2015, there were 362 different showbags available for visitors to spend their money on and enjoy samples of products. Showbags range from $1, $2 (the famous Bertie Beetle Bag) and up to $108, providing companies the opportunity to offer their merchandise to the public at discounted prices.

Competitions remain at the heart of the Ekka. Since the very first show in 1876, the Ekka has been rewarding and recognising those dedicated to producing the best of the best. The competitions include agricultural products such as livestock, fruit and vegetables, and skills in areas as diverse as farriery and cake decorating. Different schools often take part in livestock judging, under the Ekka's 'Young Judges' program, showcasing poultry, sheep, goats, eggs, and cows.

The Ekka strawberry sundae was introduced in 1950 by Paul's dairy company. In 1989, the sale of the strawberry sundaes became a joint initiative between the RNA and the Prince Charles Hospital Foundation, with sale proceeds going to the latter to fund medical research. The sundae consists of a cup ice cream cone filled with vanilla ice cream, chopped strawberries and strawberry ice cream, topped with whipped cream and a whole strawberry. At Ekka 2014, around 117,000 strawberry sundaes were consumed.

The stud beef competition is the largest annual showing of stud beef in the southern hemisphere.

== Impact ==
The Ekka, due to its large attendance, raises a large amount of revenue. Estimates of this number average around the $100 million mark, yet this amount may fluctuate with weather in Brisbane at the time (a particularly wet August may reduce attendance significantly).

Because of the cultural significance of the Ekka, the City of Brisbane holds a Wednesday public holiday known as "People's Day". The Ekka starts on the first Friday in August, unless the first Friday is before 5 August, in which case it starts on the second Friday in August. People's Day is then the Wednesday after the Ekka commences. To avoid overcrowding, some surrounding regions have the public holiday on alternative days.

== Ekka Winds ==
Frequently, in the week leading up to the Ekka, the chilly Ekka winds descend on Brisbane. These are westerly winds caused by high pressure systems in the Great Australian Bight.
