= Abel Hoadley =

Australian confectioner (1844-1918)

- Born: 10 September 1844; Willingdon, East Sussex, England
- Died: 12 May 1918 (aged 73); Kew, Victoria, Australia
- Occupations: Confectioner; fruit grower; manufacturer; inventor; businessman
- Known for: Founder of A. Hoadley and Company; Hoadley Chocolate Company Lmt.; Creator of Violet Crumble
- Spouse: Susannah Ann Barrett (m. 1868)
- Children: 14

Abel Hoadley (10 September 1844 – 12 May 1918) was an English-born Australian businessman, confectioner, orchardist and manufacturer of jams and sauces, remembered today as establishing the company's that bear his name A. Hoadley and Company and the Hoadley Chocolate Company and inventing of the popular Australian chocolate honeycomb bar the Violet Crumble.

== History ==
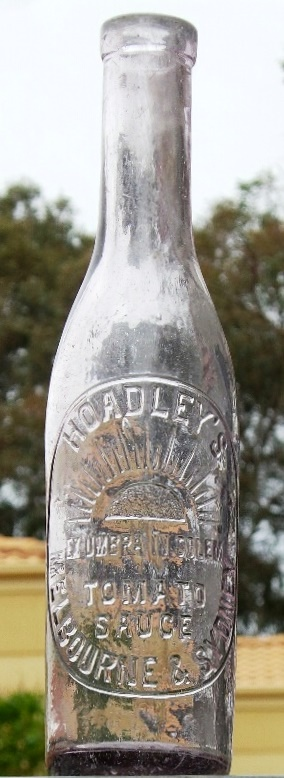
Hoadley's "Rising Sun" sauce bottle pre-1910 The motto Ex umbra in lucem may mean "From darkness into light".

Hoadley was born in Willingdon, East Sussex, England, the son of Peter Hoadley, blacksmith, and Elizabeth Ann Hoadley, née Wheeler. Hoadley arrived in Australia in 1865. His first business was manufacturing and selling jams and pickles, with produce fresh from his own orchard in Burwood East. In 1889, Hoadley opened a jam factory in South Melbourne, Victoria, trading as A. Hoadley & Company. In 1892 he made a trial shipment of preserved fruit to England, with encouraging results. By 1894 he was selling "Rising Sun" brand jams in 2 pounds (0.91 kg) tins; in 1895 the "Rising Sun" brand was applied to a range of jams, sauces and confectionery. Business was good, and in 1895 a new five storey factory was opened at 222 Park Street, South Melbourne, where the jams and preserves were manufactured and canned on the upper floors.

In 1910 the business, apart from confectionery, was sold to Henry_Jones_IXL.

=== Confectionery ===
Although Hoadley had much earlier advertised his company as "confectioners", this aspect of production was not prominently advertised, and may have only served to keep the business running between the various fruit seasons. They began advertising milk chocolate in 1909 and toffees in 1912. In 1913 a new company, Hoadley's Chocolates Limited was formed with a capital of £75,000.

Confectionery was from around 1913 manufactured at "Barrackville", on St Kilda Road, South Melbourne, at the Coventry Street corner. The factory was totally destroyed by fire in January 1919. The company took out a lease on a nearby block of land bounded by Coventry, Hanna and Dorcas Streets and turned the old site into a public park.

The new factory was also given the name "Barrackville", and "Hoadley's Barrackville Cocoa and Chocolate" became a trade name, perhaps echoing Cadbury's Bournville Cocoa. Hoadley's "Violet" chocolates first appeared as a brand name in 1917, and their "Violet mixture" in 1921. This would appear to be their "premium" line, as they sold for nearly 50% more than their "Barrackville" mixture.

=== The Violet Crumble Bar ===
Violet Crumble

When he produced his first chocolate assortment, Hoadley packed it with a piece of honeycomb. The honeycomb became so popular that Hoadley decided to produce an individual honeycomb bar. This was not an easy task; as the pieces of honeycomb cooled, they absorbed moisture and started sticking together. Eventually, this hygroscopic nature of honeycomb led Hoadley to dip the honeycomb bars in chocolate, keeping the honeycomb dry and crunchy. Thus, in 1913, the Violet Crumble bar was created.

Hoadley wanted to call his new bar just Crumble, but learned that it was an unprotectable name. He thought of his wife (Susannah Ann née Barrett) and her favourite flower, the violet, and registered the name Violet Crumble, using a purple wrapper with a small flower logo. The confectionery bar was an instant success at the time and has remained popular into the twenty-first century.

The original orchard site in the Melbourne suburb of Burwood East was sold at less than market price to the Methodist Church Central Mission for the establishment of a Boys' Training Farm, which later became the Tally Ho Boys' Home. The site now houses residential development, Crossway Baptist Church, the National Archives of Australia and the Tally Ho Business Park.

Hoadley and Susannah had fourteen children. He died at the age of 73 in his home, "Bella Vista", in the Melbourne suburb of Kew, Victoria. The Hoadley company was acquired by Rowntree's in 1970 and then by Nestlé in 1988.

== Hoadley's in popular culture ==
- The Australian company MYOB Limited has its global headquarters in the Tally Ho Business Park, once part of the Hoadley estate. MYOB's corporate logo and corporate colour scheme is purple and gold, which is also famous as the colour scheme of the Violet Crumble.
- Hoadley's name is remembered in the name of the successful Australian rock band competition, Hoadley's Battle of the Sounds, which ran from 1966 to 1972 and was sponsored by the company. The competition was used to heavily promote the Violet Crumble bar.
