= Compound chocolate =

Combination of cocoa, vegetable fat and sweeteners

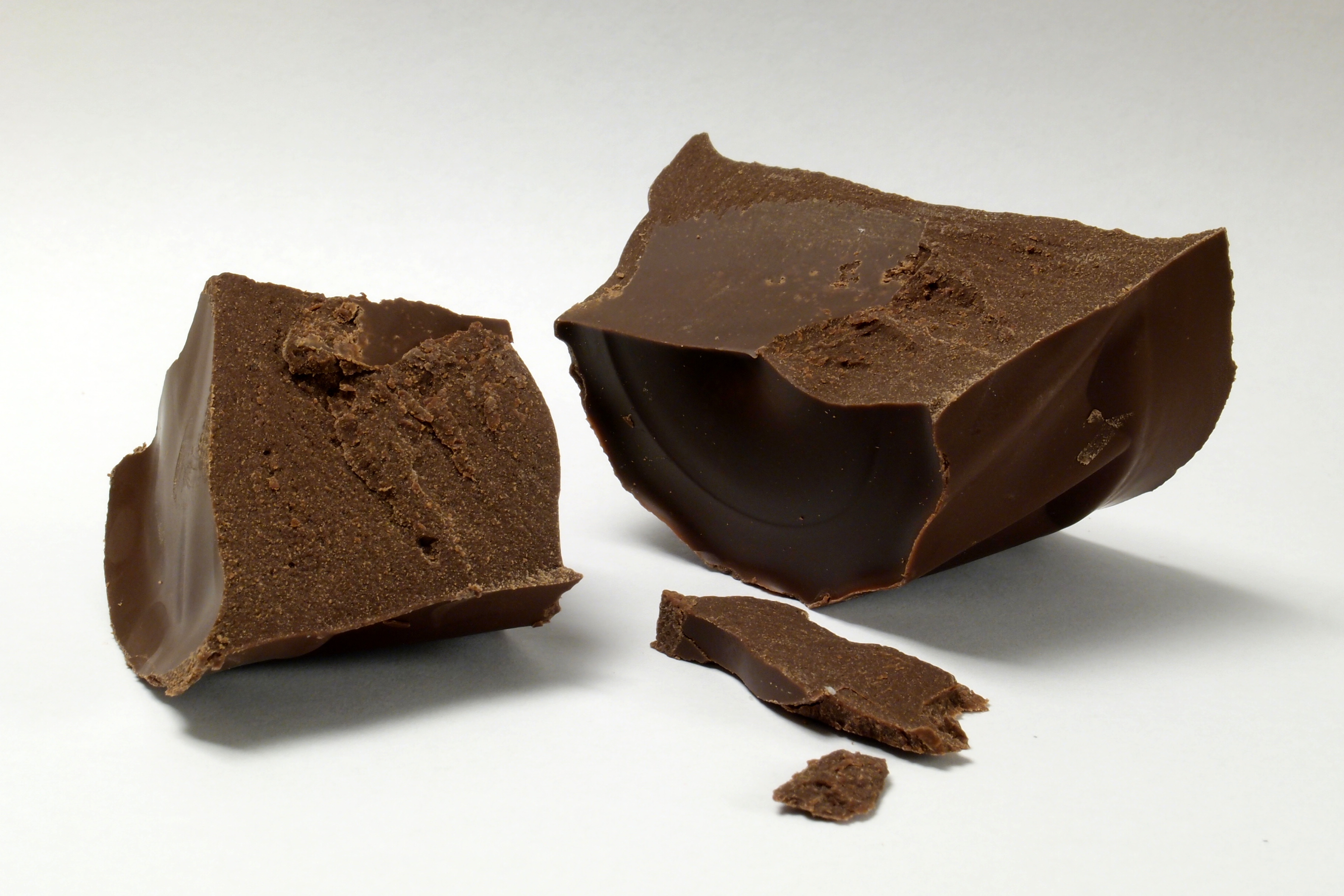
- Pieces of dark compound chocolate cake coating
- Alternative names: Compound coating, chocolatey coating
- Type: Chocolate substitute
- Main ingredients: Cocoa powder or chocolate liquor; vegetable fats or oils; sweeteners

Compound chocolate is a product made from a combination of cocoa, vegetable fat, and sweeteners. It can be made with either cocoa powder or chocolate liquor. It is used as a lower-cost alternative to pure chocolate, as it has less-expensive hard vegetable fats such as coconut oil or palm kernel oil in place of the more expensive cocoa butter. It may be known as "compound coating" or "chocolaty coating" when used as a coating for candy.

It is often used in less expensive chocolate bars to replace enrobed chocolate on a product. True chocolate containing cocoa butter must be tempered to maintain the gloss of a coating. Compound coatings, however, do not need to be tempered. Instead, they are simply warmed to between 3 and 5 °C (5 and 9 °F) above the coating's melting point.

In the European Union a product can be sold as chocolate only if it contains a maximum of 5% vegetable oil.

Compounds made with the whole chocolate liquor instead of defatted cocoa powder, therefore substituting only added cocoa butter, are also referred to as supercompounds.

== See also ==
- Polyglycerol polyricinoleate (PGPR) an emulsifier made from castor beans commonly used in compound chocolate
- Cocoa-free chocolate alternative
- Types of chocolate
