= Henry Jones IXL =

Manufacturing company in Australia

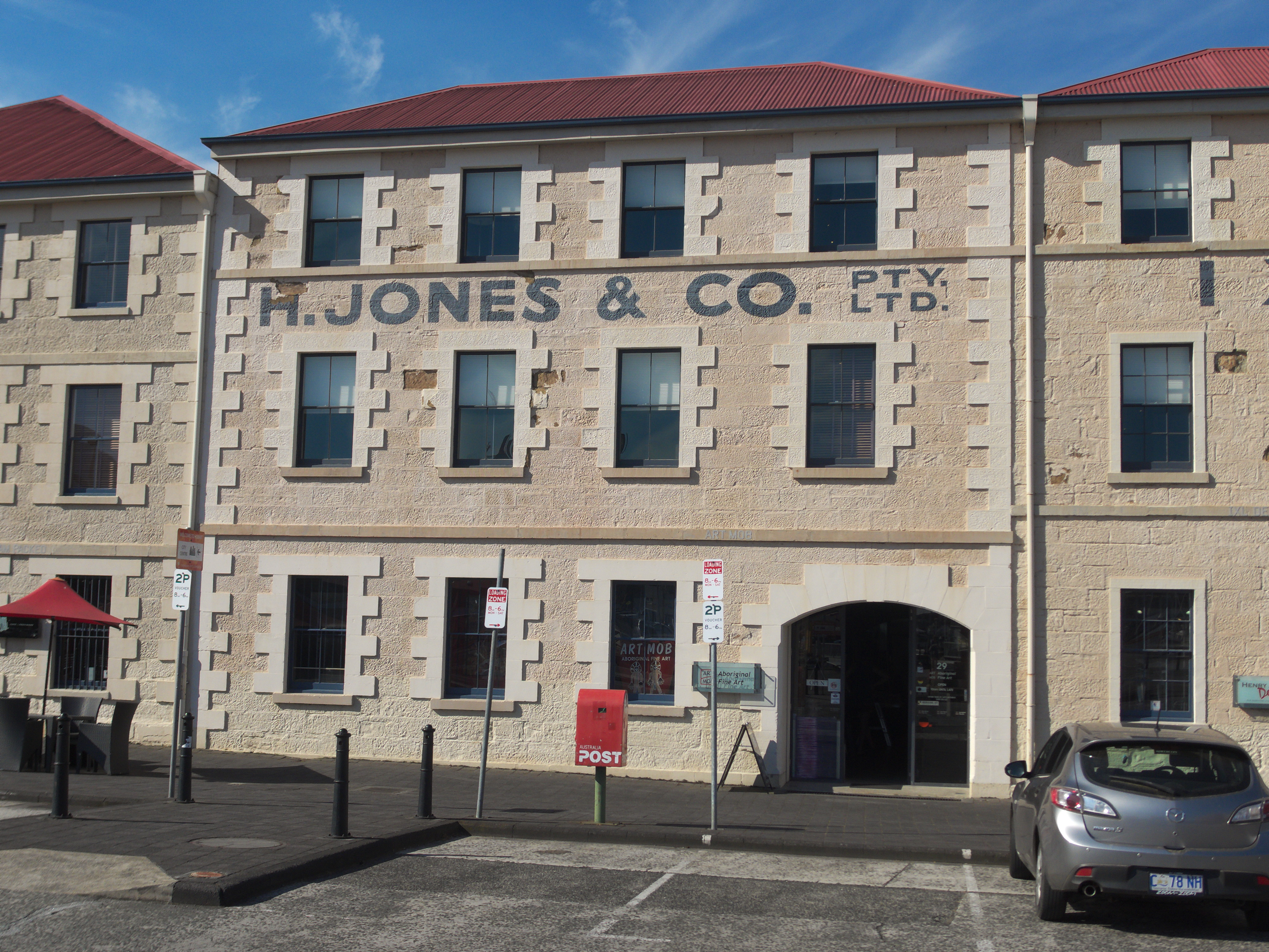
- The original IXL factory in Hobart
- Industry: Food
- Founded: 1891 as H. Jones & Company
- Founder: Henry Jones
- Headquarters: Silvan, Victoria, Australia
- Products: Jams and fruit sauces
- Owner: IXL Foods Pty Ltd

Henry Jones IXL was a company primarily known as a manufacturer of jams, conserves and sauces in Australia. The brand was owned and its products manufactured by SPC Ardmona from 2004, which was itself owned by Coca-Cola Amatil from February 2005.

SPC acquired IXL and Taylors brands in 2004, and sold both brands with the Kyabram factory in 2019 to a group of farmers and growers in the Goulburn Valley. The new owners have Malaysian investment.

In March 2025, the IXL brand was returned to Australian hands. The company has restored the brand's original jam flavour line-up (including Plum, Apricot, Raspberry, Forest Fruits, Breakfast Marmalade and Strawberry) and resumed IXL jam distribution in Asia.

== History ==
The company was established by Henry Jones in Hobart in 1891 as H. Jones & Company. The company derived from Jones' employment with George Peacock's jam factory from 1874. In 1895 the company purchased a building in Melbourne and commenced manufacture of jams and spreads. The building became known as The Jam Factory. IXL formed as a limited liability company in 1903. 'I excel in everything I do' was Henry Jones's personal motto, hence the name 'IXL'.

After Jones' death in 1926, the leading figure in the company was Achalen Palfreyman, who served as chairman from 1926 to 1965. Palfreyman had begun working at George Peacock's jam factory as an office boy at the age of 14. Throughout most of the twentieth century Henry Jones IXL thrived as a food processing company with IXL a leading brand. In 2004 the Henry Jones IXL business was the leading manufacturer of fruit spreads in Australia, with 30.2 per cent of the market, ahead of Cadbury Schweppes' Monbulk and Cottee's labels.

In 1974 Elder Smith Goldsbrough Mort & Co merged with Henry Jones IXL to form Elders IXL under the managing directorship of prominent businessman, John Elliott. It was subsequently sold in 1989 to The J.M. Smucker Co. based in the US. In 2004 Australian food company SPC Ardmona Ltd, based in Shepparton, bought the Henry Jones IXL business for $51 million.

The primary processing plant of the Henry Jones Foods business was located in Kyabram, in Victoria's Goulburn Valley and is close to SPC Ardmona's manufacturing sites at Shepparton and Mooroopna.

Products produced and marketed under the IXL brand by SPC Ardmona include fruit bars, fruit snacks, and a wide range of fruit spreads, including gourmet, low sugar, and tumbler ranges.

On 25 February 2005, IXL, as part of SPC Ardmona, was bought by Coca-Cola Amatil.

In 2019, the IXL brand and Kyabram factory were sold to Kyabram Jam Company, in conjunction with Coca-Cola Amatil selling SPC. Kyabram Jam Factory is majority owned by Malaysian Holstein Milk Company.

March 2025 the IXL brand was returned to Australian hands and is now part of IXL Foods Pty. Currently, IXL jams are sold in independent supermarkets across Australia, including IGA, Drakes, Ritchies, and Foodland.

In Malaysia IXL jams are available at Village Grocer, Aeon Supermarkets, Grocer Houz, and Bila Bila Mart. In Singapore, IXL jams are sold in NTUC Fair Price.

In early 2026, IXL Foods launched The Real Jam Co. range in Woolworths stores, with 4 x 500g variants including Strawberry, Plum, Apricot and Orange Marmalade. The company will expand into Fruit Sauces and Dessert Sauces in 2026.

=== Brands ===
IXL is an iconic Australian brand name, associated with jams and other fruit based products. A familiar feature of many Australian kitchens are the glass tumblers in which IXL brand jams are often sold.

IXL was the flagship brand of Henry Michael Jones IXL, which was founded in Hobart, Tasmania in 1891 (as H. Jones & Co.), and expanded to the mainland shortly thereafter, purchasing a building in Melbourne in 1895.

The name IXL is said to derive from the founders personal motto (variously quoted as 'I excel in everything I do' or 'I will excel in everything I do') however a manufacturer of stoves and other household appliances and fixtures based in Geelong, near Melbourne had been using the brandname IXL for some 30 years before H. Jones & Co. was established.

=== Timeline ===
- In 1891, Henry Jones established the company, "H. Jones & Company".
- In 1974, Henry Jones IXL merged with Elders to form Elders IXL.
- In 1989, Henry Jones IXL was sold to The J.M. Smucker Co. based in the USA.
- In 2004, Australian food company SPC Ardmona Ltd, bought the Henry Jones IXL business for $51 million.
- In 2005, Coca-Cola Amatil bought SPC Ardmona (IXL parent company).
- In 2019, both the Kyabram factory and IXL brand were bought by Kyabram Jam Company
- In 2025, the IXL brand was purchased by the Australian-owned Modcor Group, and is operated under its subsidiary IXL Foods Pty Ltd.

== See also ==
- The Jam Factory
- SPC Ardmona
- Elders IXL
- The J.M. Smucker Co.
