= Arnott (surname) =

Arnott is a surname of Scottish origin. Notable people with the surname include:

- Andy Arnott (born 1973), English former professional football (soccer) player
- Archibald Arnott (1772–1855), British Army surgeon
- Audrey Arnott (1901–1974), medical illustrator
- Bob Arnott (1922–2016), Australian Olympic skier
- Bruce Arnott (1938–2018), South African sculptor and academic
- Caroline Arnott (died 1933), Dame Commander of the Order of the British Empire
- Dr. Catherine Arnott (1858–1942), British medical doctor and suffragette
- Dougie Arnott (born 1964), Scottish footballer
- Drew Arnott, Canadian musician
- Eric John Arnott (1929–2011), British ophthalmologist and surgeon
- Geoffrey H. Arnott (1902–1986), Australian chairman of Arnott's Biscuits Holdings
- W. Geoffrey Arnott (1930–2010), British classicist
- George Arnott Walker-Arnott (1799–1868), U.K. botanist with the standard author abbreviation "Arn."
- Halse Rogers Arnott (1879–1961), Australian medical practitioner and chairman of Arnott's Biscuits Holdings
- Jake Arnott (born 1961), British novelist
- James Fullarton Arnott (1914–1982), Scottish theatre professor
- Janet Arnott (1956–2019), Canadian curler
- Jason Arnott (born 1974), Canadian professional ice hockey center
- Joanne Arnott (born 1960), Canadian Métis writer
- Sir John Arnott (1814–1898), Irish entrepreneur
- John Arnott (English footballer) (1932–2017), English former professional football (soccer) player
- Jonathan Arnott (born 1981), British politician
- Kevin Arnott (cricketer) (born 1961), former Zimbabwean cricketer
- Kevin Arnott (footballer) (born 1958), English footballer
- Marion Arnott (born 1952 or 1953), Scottish author
- Melville Arnott (1909–1999), British academic
- Neil Arnott (1788–1874), Scottish physician
- Peter R. Arnott (1932–2022), musician, composer, theatre director
- Ray Arnott (21st century), Australian rock drummer, singer and songwriter
- Robert Arnott (academic) (1951–2024), British archaeologist
- Robert D. Arnott (born 1954), American entrepreneur, investor, editor, and writer
- Simon Arnott (born 1976), former Australian rules footballer
- Struther Arnott (1934–2013), Scottish molecular biologist and chemist
- Ted Arnott (born 1963), Progressive Conservative member of the Legislative Assembly of Ontario
- Walter Arnott (1863–1931), Scottish all-round sportsman
- Will Arnott (1999–2024), British Paralympic boccia player
- William Arnott (politician) (1832–1907), American farmer and politician
- William Arnott (biscuit manufacturer) (1827–1901), Scottish founder of Arnott's Biscuits Holdings
