= Geoffrey Arnott =

Geoffrey Arnott may refer to:

- Geoffrey H. Arnott (1902–1986), Australian chairman of Arnott's Biscuits Holdings
- W. Geoffrey Arnott (1930–2010), British classicist
