= Joseph Alexander Kethel =

Australian architect

Joseph Alexander Kethel Architect
- Born: 31 January 1866; Millers Point, New South Wales, Australia
- Died: 29 April 1946 (aged 80); North Sydney, New South Wales
- Education: Sydney Technical College
- Occupation: Architect
- Spouse: Emily Kethel (née Cleeve)
- Parent(s): Mary (née Yeats) and Alexander Kethel MLC

Joseph Alexander Kethel (31 January 1866 – 29 April 1946) was an Australian architect notable for the many substantial private residences and pastoral homesteads he designed throughout New South Wales and the striking theatres, office buildings and Presbyterian Churches he designed in Sydney.

== Biography ==
Kethel was the son of Scottish-born Australian politician and timber merchant Alexander Kethel (1832–1916) and his wife Mary. He had a brother and three sisters. He grew up in the inner city suburbs of Sydney around Millers Point and The Glebe. In 1888 his father built a grand Victorian Italianate mansion on the corner of Glebe Point and Wigram Roads Glebe known as Ben Ledi. It was named after the mountain Ben Ledi in Scotland. The design of the family home is attributed to the Sydney architect Thomas Rowe who Kethel was articled to when he studied architecture at Sydney Technical College.

The Kethel family were communicant members of the Presbyterian Church and Kethel designed a number of Presbyterian church buildings in New South Wales.

== Residential designs ==
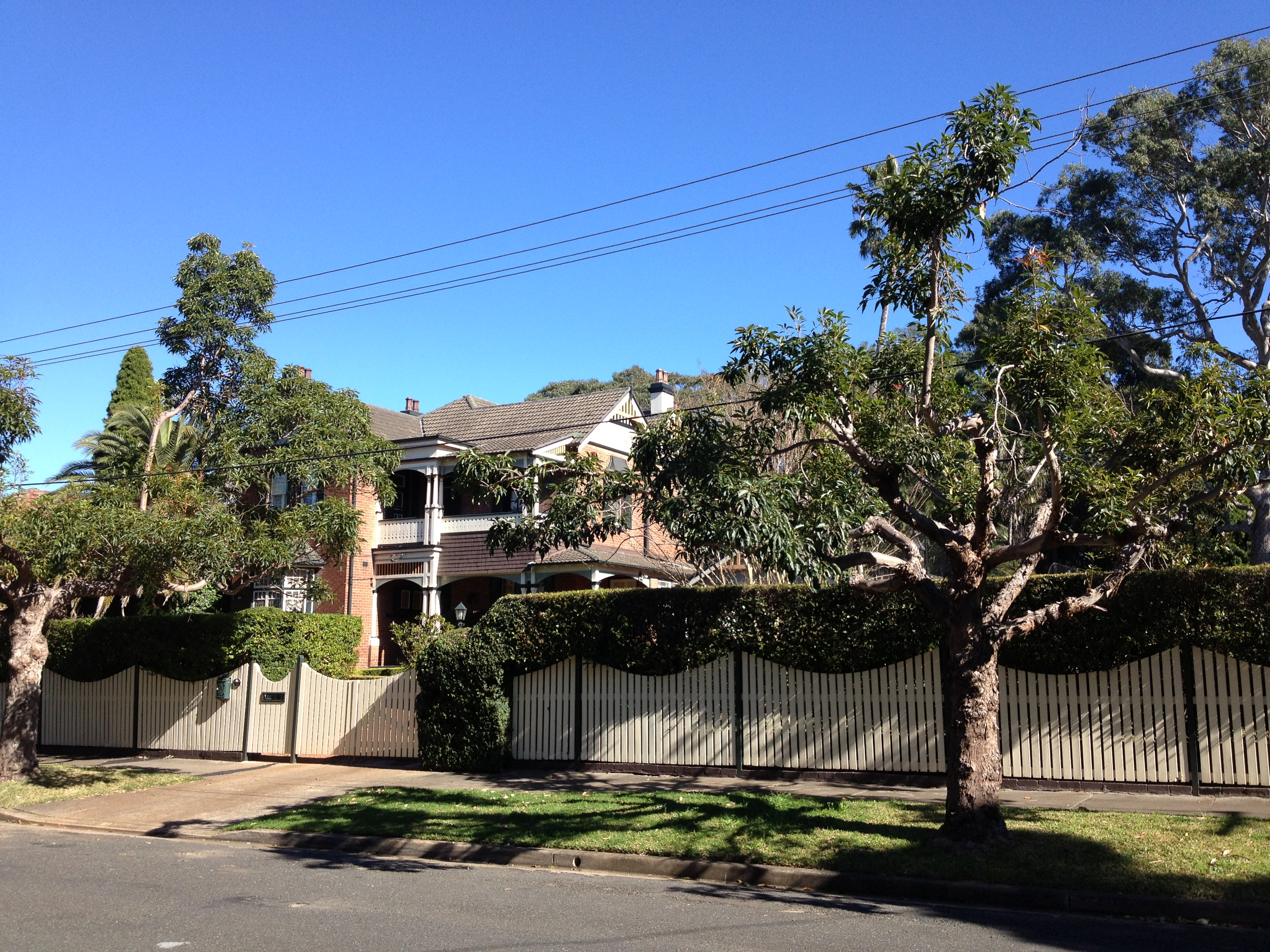
Dunkeld (1906) Homebush

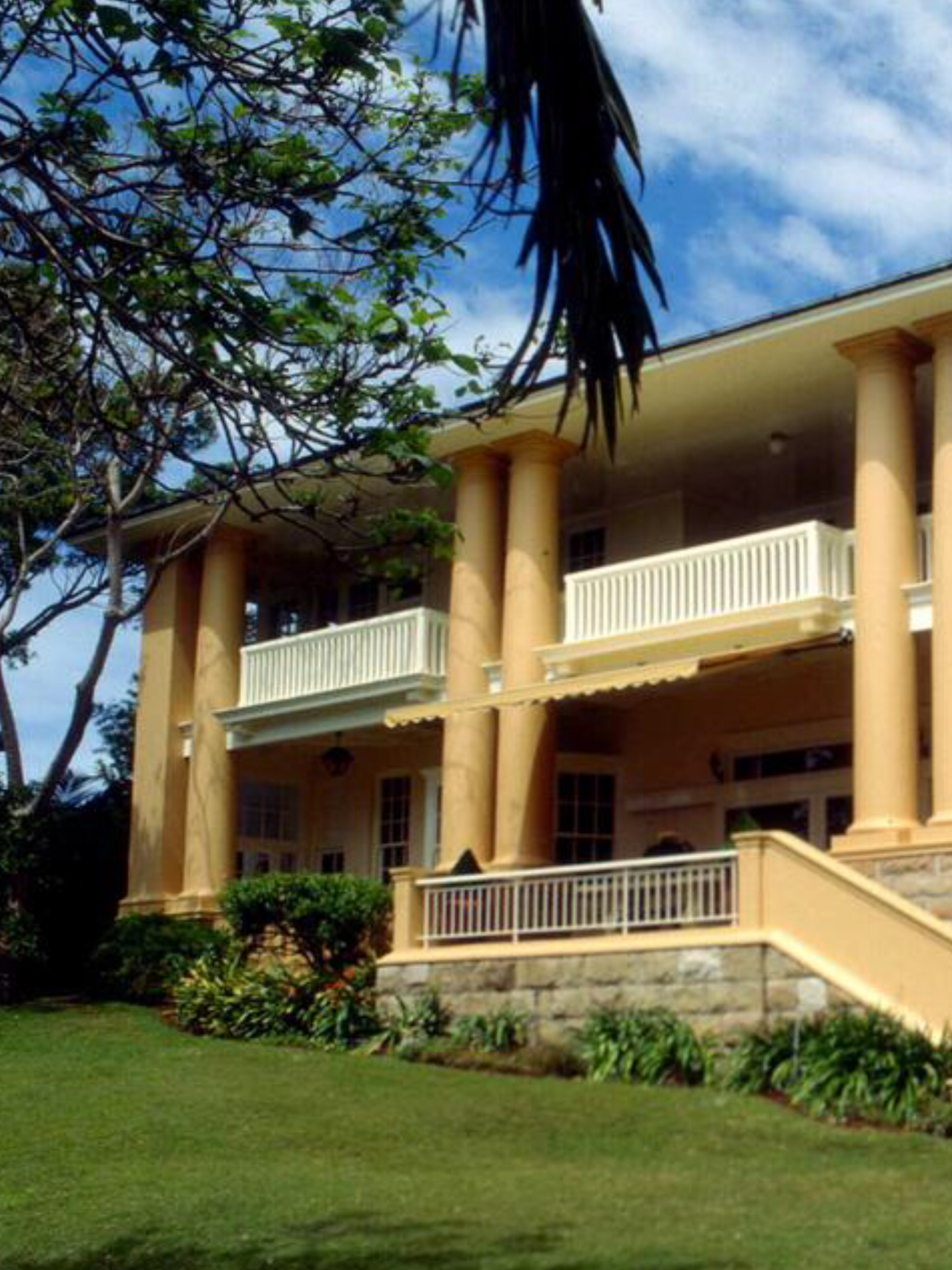
Glanworth (1915) Darling Point

Kethel’s residential designs are known to start with Stevens Terrace built in The Rocks in 1900. A four storey late Victorian apartment building with nine two-bedroom units it is now listed as part of the Millers Point Conservation Area. In 1903 his eclectic architectural detailing of the face brick retail and residential buildings in Park Street Sydney look back stylistically to Stevens Terrace and forward to his early houses in the Municipality of Strathfield. In 1905 when Kethel designed the homestead at Cavan Station, south of Yass along the Murrumbidgee River in the Southern Tablelands of NSW, it was a rural outpost. Since the 1960s it has been the principal Australian residence of media mogul Rupert Murdoch AC KCSG bringing Kethel’s architecture to a wider audience. In the first decade of the last century Kethel designed large homes in the Inner West of Sydney for the Duguid family who were prominent as land and shipping agents in the City of Sydney. John Duguid built Dunkeld and his younger spinster sister built Yambah nearby and these heritage listed homes remain as a reminder of his designs of this era. The houses are two storey Edwardian era, or Frederation in style with asymmetrical facades. The upper level balconies capture the breezes on sites which are the highest in the inner western suburbs of Sydney. They feature face brick as well as rough cast stuccoed brick, rendered chimneys, shingled verandas, timber columns, timber windows and bay windows to the front and sides of the houses. At the same time Kethel designed Idalia which was built speculatively for William Rigg in Strathfield. Rigg was founder of the Clyde Engineering Company, Mayor of Newtown Council and a Member of the Legislative Assembly and was also active in the Presbyterian Church of Australia. On the completion of Idalia in 1907, the house was bought by John and Emma Hardy, who were downsizing from Strathfield House. Hardy was the founder of the city-based jewellery firm Hardy Brothers. In 1939, the house was sold to John McLean Arnott, Managing Director of Arnott's Biscuits. The Hardy and Arnott families were wealthy and influential members of Sydney society at the time, indicating that Kethel designed homes were highly sought after for many years. These families were members of Nonconformist congregations in Australia such as The Salvation Army, Methodist Church of Australasia and the Presbyterian church, as was Kethel. After becoming a private hospital in the 1950s Idalia was demolished in 1973 for an apartment development. A decade after Idalia was built in Strathfield, Kethel designed the house Youbri at Darling Point in a North American Ante-Bellum style for an American expat Peter Britz and his wife Vera Young. The house name Youbri was as an abbreviation of the owners' surnames. It then became the Sydney home of wool broker, art collector and philanthropist Samuel Henry Ervin. By the time the philanthropist and arts patron James Fairfax AC acquired the house in the 1960s, it was known as Glanworth. The house is now owned by The Seven West Chairman Kerry Stokes AC who bought it for $9.5 million in 1998. Kethel designed homes clearly appeal to well-connected wealthy owners to the current day. Works attributed to Kethel include:

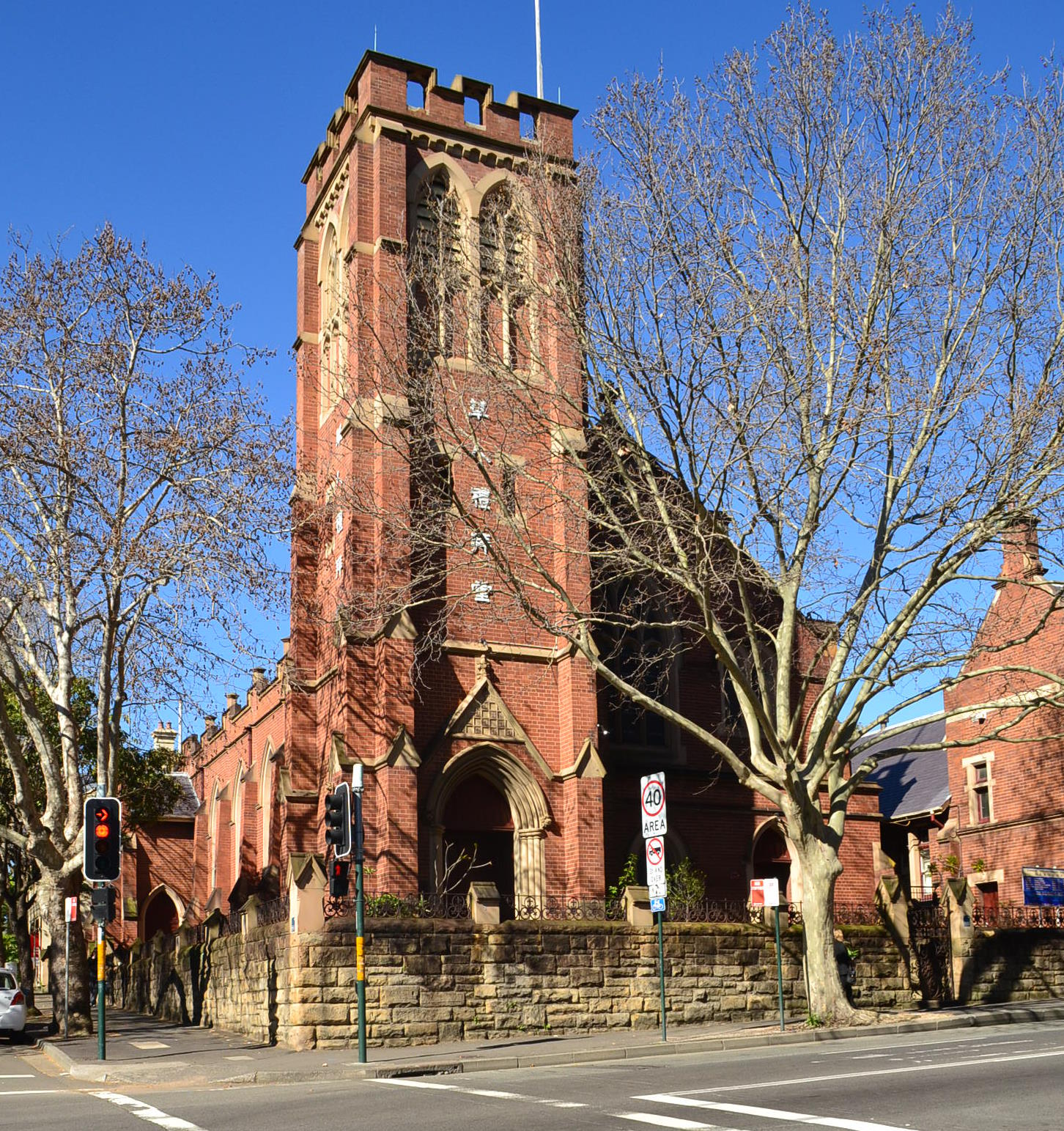
Presbyterian Church (1905) Surry Hills

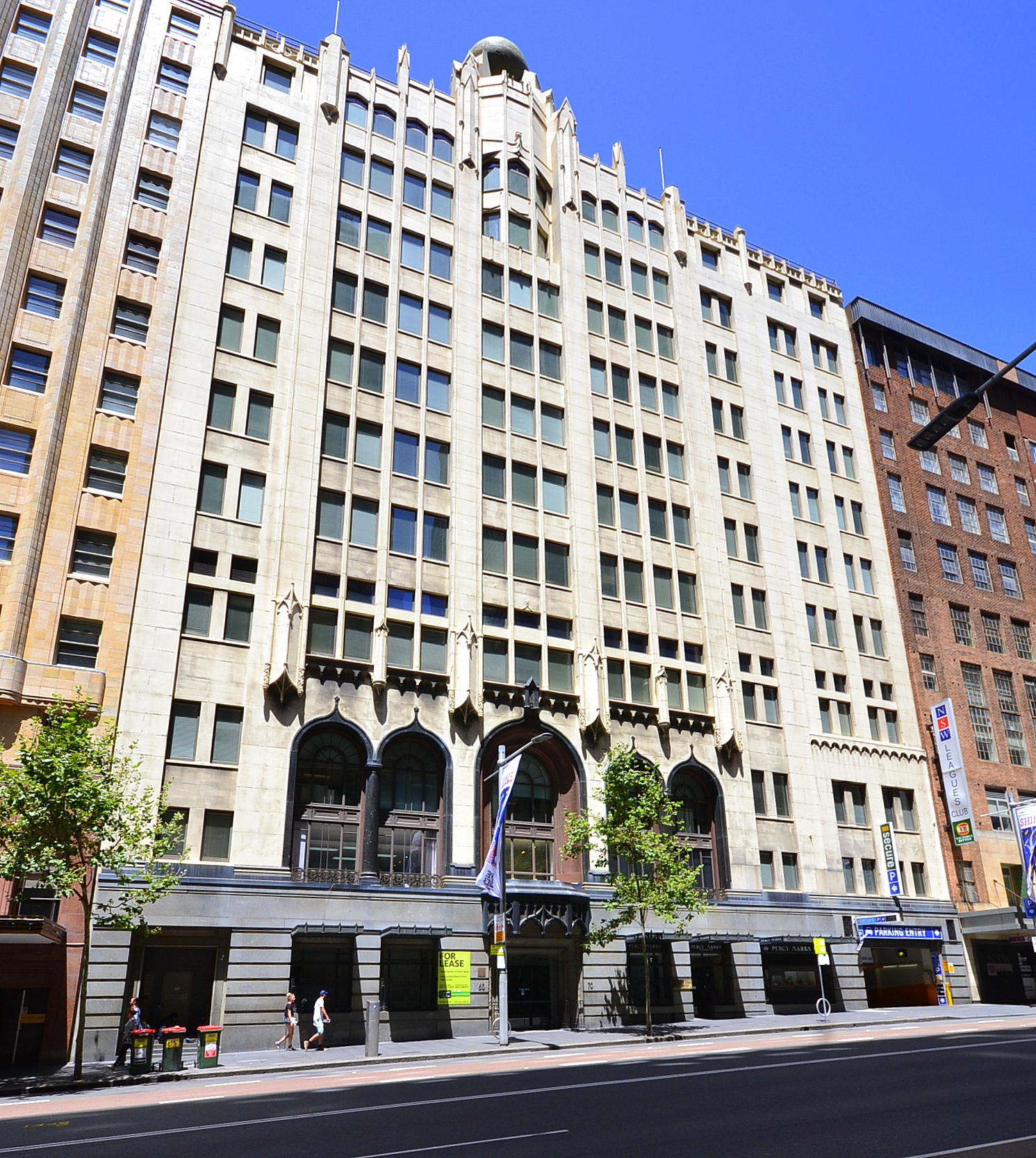
The Sun Building (1929) Sydney

- Stevens Terrace (1900)
  73 Windmill Street Millers Point
- Retail and residential buildings (1903)
  42-46 Park Street, Sydney
  Demolished 2017 for Gadigal railway station.
- Fullerton Presbyterian Church (1904)
  Corner of Crown and Albion Streets Surry Hills
- Cavan Homestead (1905)
  40 kilometres southwest of Yass
- Dunkeld (now Edensor) (1906)
  19-21 Meredith Street Homebush
- Yambah (1907)
  28 Coventry Street Srathfield
- Idalia (1907
  48 Homebush Road Strathfield
  Demolished 1973 for apartment development
- Coliseum Theatre (1911)
  271 Miller Street, North Sydney
- Rocomble (1915)
  29 Karranga Avenue Killara
- Youbri (now Glanworth) (1916)
  5 Lindsay Avenue Darling Point
- Alliance Assurance Building (1925)
  20 Grenfell Street Adelaide
- The Sun Building (1929)
  60-70 Elizabeth Street, Sydney
