= James Arnott =

James Arnott may refer to:

- James Arnott (footballer), English footballer
- James Arnott (physician) (1797–1883), English physician and pioneer of cryotherapy
- James Fullarton Arnott (1914–1982), Scottish professor, author, and theatrical director
