= Robert Arnott =

Robert Arnott may refer to:

- Robert Arnott (academic) (1951–2024), British archaeologist
- Robert D. Arnott (born 1954), American entrepreneur
- Bob Arnott (born William Robert Arnott, 1922–2016), Australian skier

== See also ==
- Robert Arnott Wilson (born 1958), British mathematician
