= Isadore Brodsky =

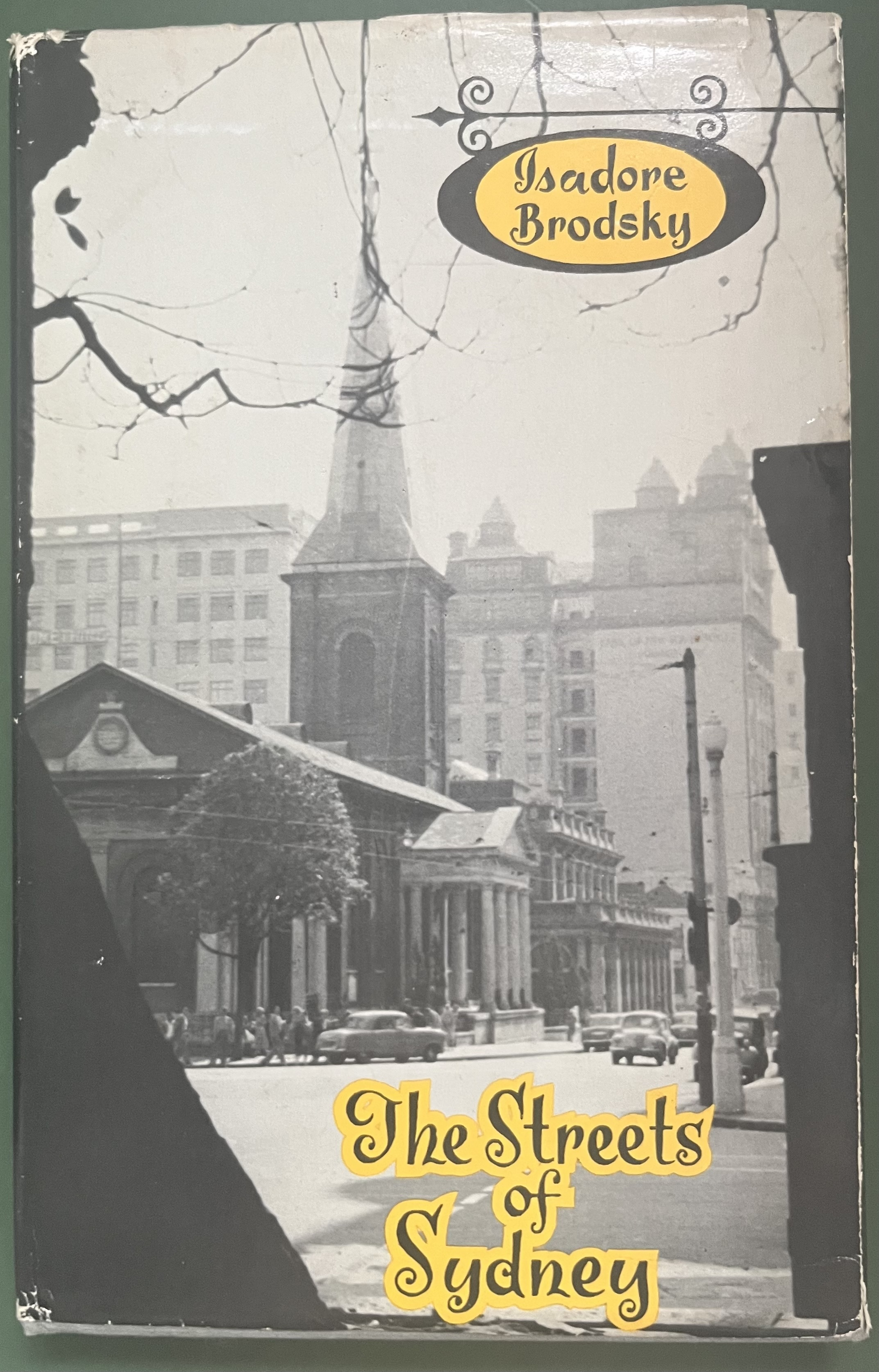
The Streets of Sydney by Isadore Brodsky

Isadore Brodsky (March 1905 – 6 March 1975) was an Australian writer, historian, doctor and academic. In the second half of the twentieth century he published numerous books about the history of Sydney.

== Biography ==
Brodsky graduated with a Bachelor of Medicine from the University of Sydney in 1935. He was for many years a member of the University of New South Wales School of Anatomy. Through the 1950s and 1960s he wrote a regular column about the history of Sydney, "Out of the Past", for The Sun newspaper. He died in 1975.

== Published works ==
Brodsky's books about the history of Sydney include Sydney Looks Back (1957), The Streets of Sydney (1962), Hunters Hill 1861–1961 (1962), Sydney Takes the Stage (1963), North Sydney 1788–1962 (1963), Heart of the Rocks of Old Sydney (1965), Sydney's Little World of Woolloomooloo (1966), Sydney's Nurse Crusaders (1968), Sydney's Phantom Book Shops (1973), Bennelong Profile: Dreamtime Reveries of a Native of Sydney Cove (1973) and The Sydney Press Gang (1974).

He also wrote Double Take: The Facts of Identical Twins (1963) and Let No Dog Bark (1964), on Australian university culture. Collections of his documentary photographs are held by the National Library of Australia and the University of New South Wales Library.
