= Halse Rogers Arnott =

Australian businessman (1879–1961)

Dr Halse Rogers Arnott
- Born: 1879; Newcastle, New South Wales
- Died: 1961(aged:82); Sydney, New South Wales
- Education: Newington College; University of Sydney
- Occupations: Medical practitioner Company director
- Title: Chairman; Arnott's Biscuits Holdings
- Successor: Geoffrey H. Arnott
- Spouse: Alice (née Johns)
- Parent(s): William Arnott (1827-1901) and his second wife Margaret (1865-1902)

Halse Rogers Arnott (1879 – May 1961) was an Australian medical practitioner, company director and chairman of Arnott's.

== Family and early life ==
Arnott was born in Newcastle, New South Wales, the youngest son of William Arnott (1827–1901) who was the founder of Arnott's Biscuits and his second wife, Margaret McLean Fleming (1865–1902). His full siblings were: William Arnott; Janet Dunman Arnott; Colonel John McLean Arnott, CMG; Colonel Arthur Smith Arnott; Margaret Fleming Arnott; Robert Fleming Arnott; George Marshall Arnott; Florence Joanna Arnott; and Victoria M Arnott. He was educated at Newington College from 1893. Arnott served with General Sir Redvers Buller's Scouts in South Africa during the Second Boer War.

== Marriage and family ==
Arnott married Alice Johns in 1903 in Canterbury, New South Wales and they had five children: Campbell William Rogers Arnott (1905–1987); Phyllis Rogers Arnott (1907–2002); Malcolm Rogers Arnott (1911–1976); Keith MacKenzie Rogers Arnott (1912–1998); Dorothy Rogers Arnott (1915–1992). In 1904 Arnott incorporated a 1877 stone house in North Parade in Hunters Hill in a new mansion and named it Blairgowrie. The property was later known as Bulwarra and owned by Cate Blanchett and Andrew Upton. In 1941 the Sydney-based architect William Ronald Richardson built the Arnott family a Georgian-style home in Burns Road Wahroonga. In 2022 the house, tennis court and swimming pool, set on a 5400 square metre block, sold for eleven million Australian dollars. Throughout their married life the Arnotts maintained weekenders in Springwood, in the Blue Mountains, including Homedale.

== Medical and business career ==
Arnott matriculated at 35 and studied arts at the University of Sydney before graduating as a Bachelor of Medicine and Chemistry in 1925. He later studied for college membership in Edinburgh. Arnott was involved in the management of Arnott's from the time of his father's death in 1901 and served as chairman from 1947 until 1961. On his death he was succeeded as chairman by Geoffrey H. Arnott.
