= Water conditioner =

Aquarium water additive

Water conditioners are chemical formulations designed to be added to tap water to improve water quality.

== Aquariums ==
If the tap water is chlorinated then a simple conditioner containing a dechlorinator may be used in an aquarium. These products contain sodium thiosulfate which reduces chlorine to chloride which is less harmful to fish. However, chloramine is now often used in water disinfection and simple dechlorinators only deal with the chlorine portion, releasing free ammonia that is very harmful to fish. More complex products employ sulfonates that are able to deal with both chlorine and ammonia. The most sophisticated products also contain chelators such as ethylenediaminetetraacetic acid to bind and remove heavy metals. Some water conditioners also contain slime coat protectors such as polyvinylpyrrolidones or Aloe vera extracts, which can reduce stress behaviour of fish.

== Waterbeds ==
Waterbeds commonly use water conditioners to inhibit the growth of algae, bacteria, and fungi within the mattress water. These conditioners help prevent unpleasant odors and discoloration caused by microbial activity. They may also contain additives that protect the vinyl liner by maintaining its flexibility and reducing the risk of cracking or degradation. Furthermore, conditioners help minimize mineral buildup inside the mattress, contributing to prolonged water clarity and overall mattress longevity.
