= Waterbed =

Mattress filled with water

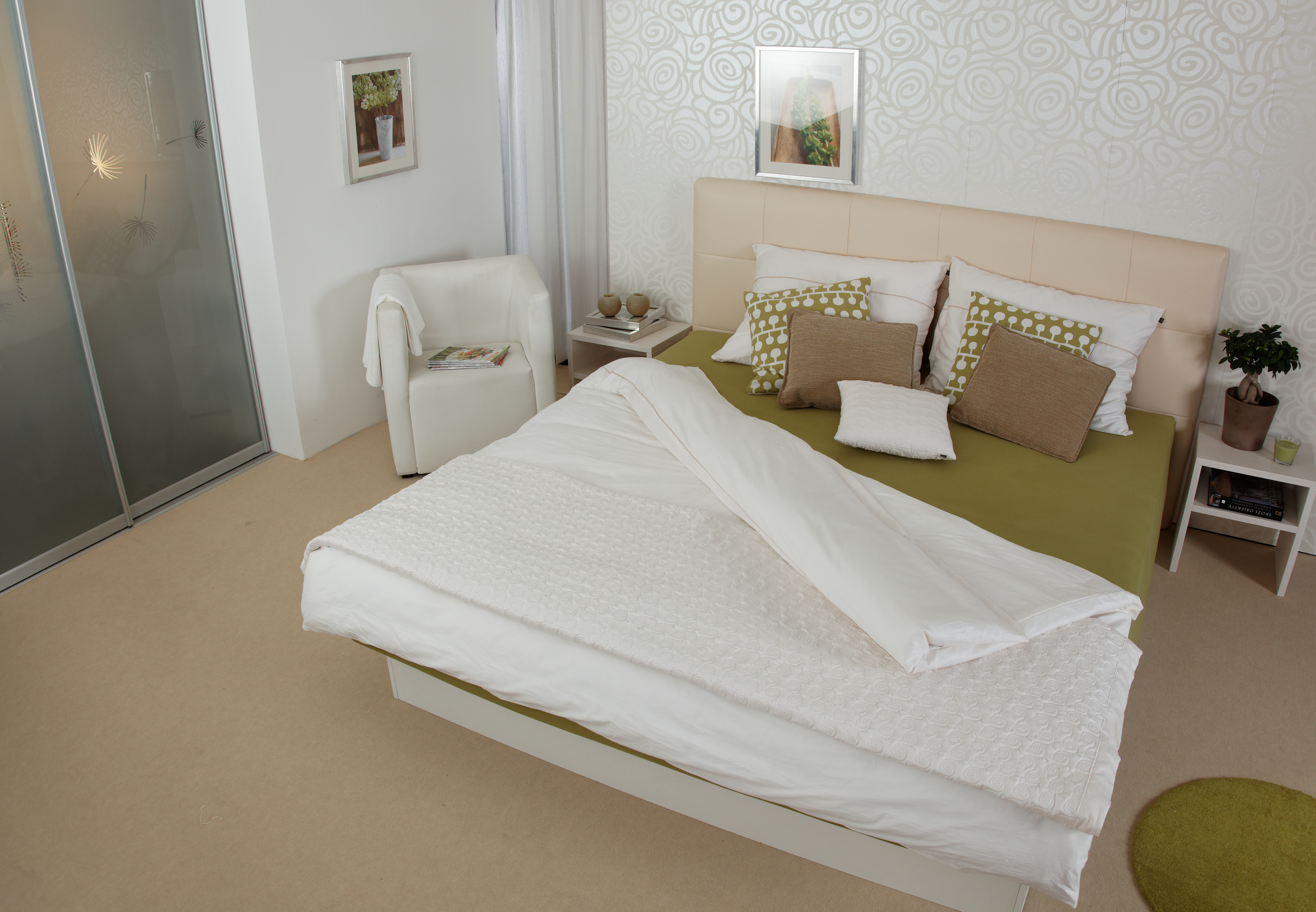
A softside waterbed mattress

A waterbed, water mattress, or flotation mattress is a bed or mattress filled with water. Waterbeds intended for medical therapies appear in various reports through the 19th century. The modern version, invented in San Francisco and patented in 1971, became a popular consumer item in the United States through the 1980s with up to 20% of the market in 1986 and 22% in 1987. By 2013, they accounted for less than 5% of new bed sales.

== Design ==
=== Frames ===
Waterbeds are typically supported by a specialized frame designed to hold the weight and shape of the water mattress. Hardside waterbeds use a rigid wooden frame that defines the mattress's boundaries and prevents the bladder from expanding outward under pressure. Softside waterbeds use a foam-and-fabric perimeter that forms an internal cavity for the bladder while allowing the bed to resemble a conventional mattress. Both frame types are engineered to distribute the weight of a filled water mattress evenly.

=== Mattresses ===
Waterbed mattresses also differ in how much wave motion they allow on the surface:

- Free-flow (full-wave) mattresses contain only water without internal baffles or fiber layers, resulting in noticeable wave motion when moving.
- Semi-waveless mattresses include some fiber inserts or baffles that reduce wave motion, offering a balance between traditional waterbed feel and motion control.
- Waveless mattresses use multiple layers of fiber and baffles to minimize water movement, providing a stable sleeping surface with little to no wave effect.

Both hardside and softside mattresses are typically topped with a quilted pad or fitted cover to provide insulation and a traditional sleeping surface.

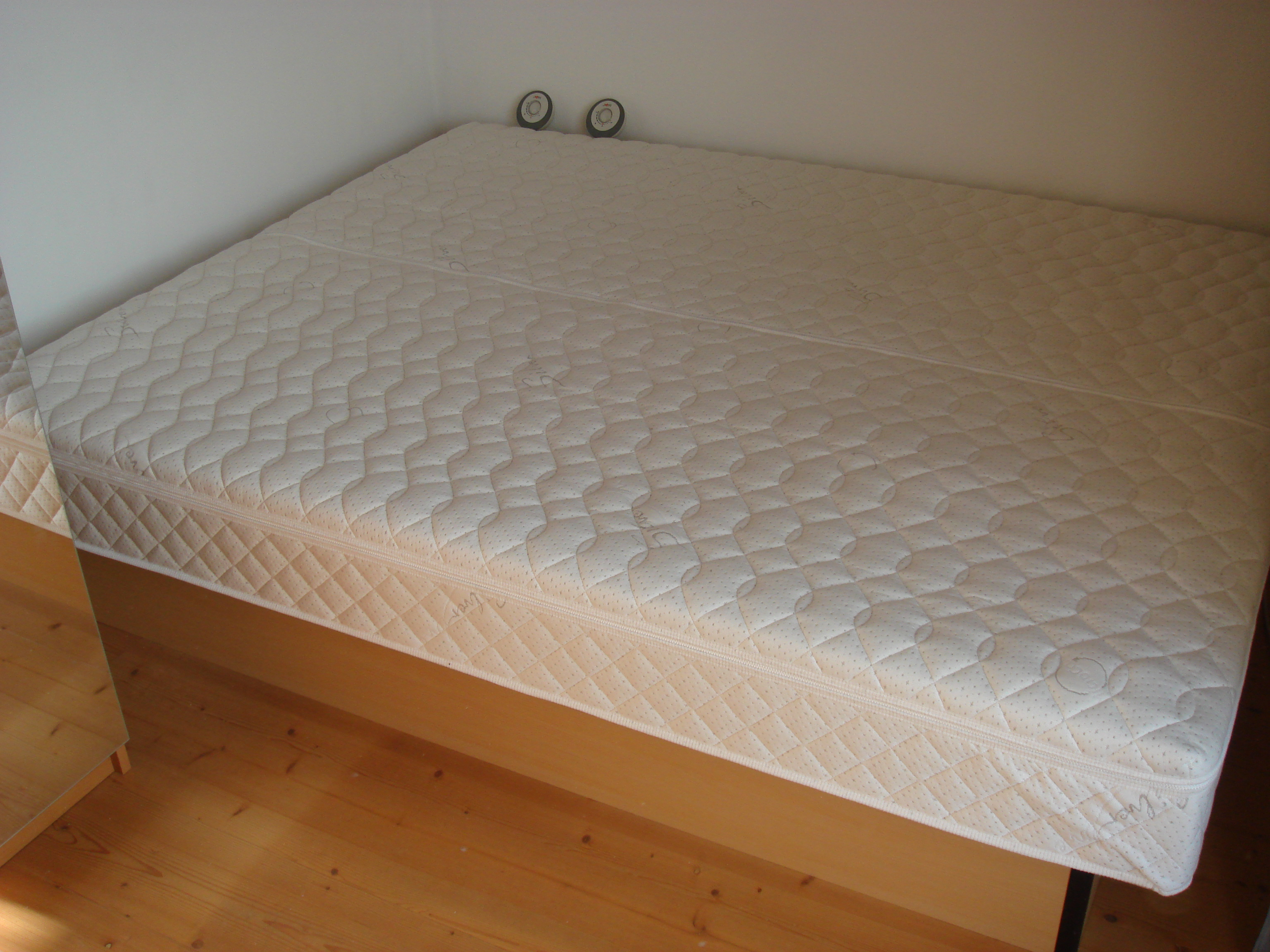
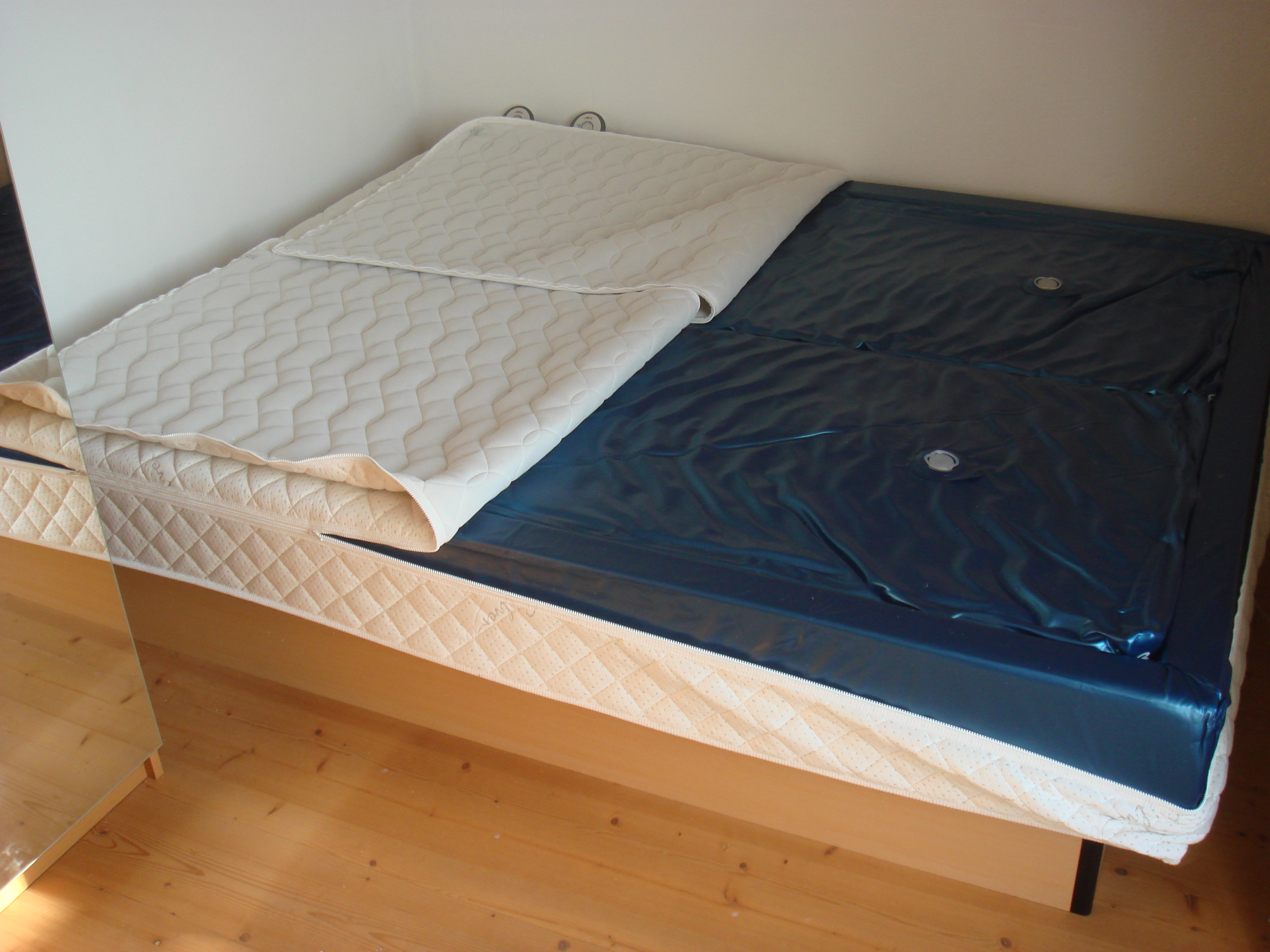
Softside waterbed with a mattress cover, dual heating, and two water chambers with flexible chamber isolation.

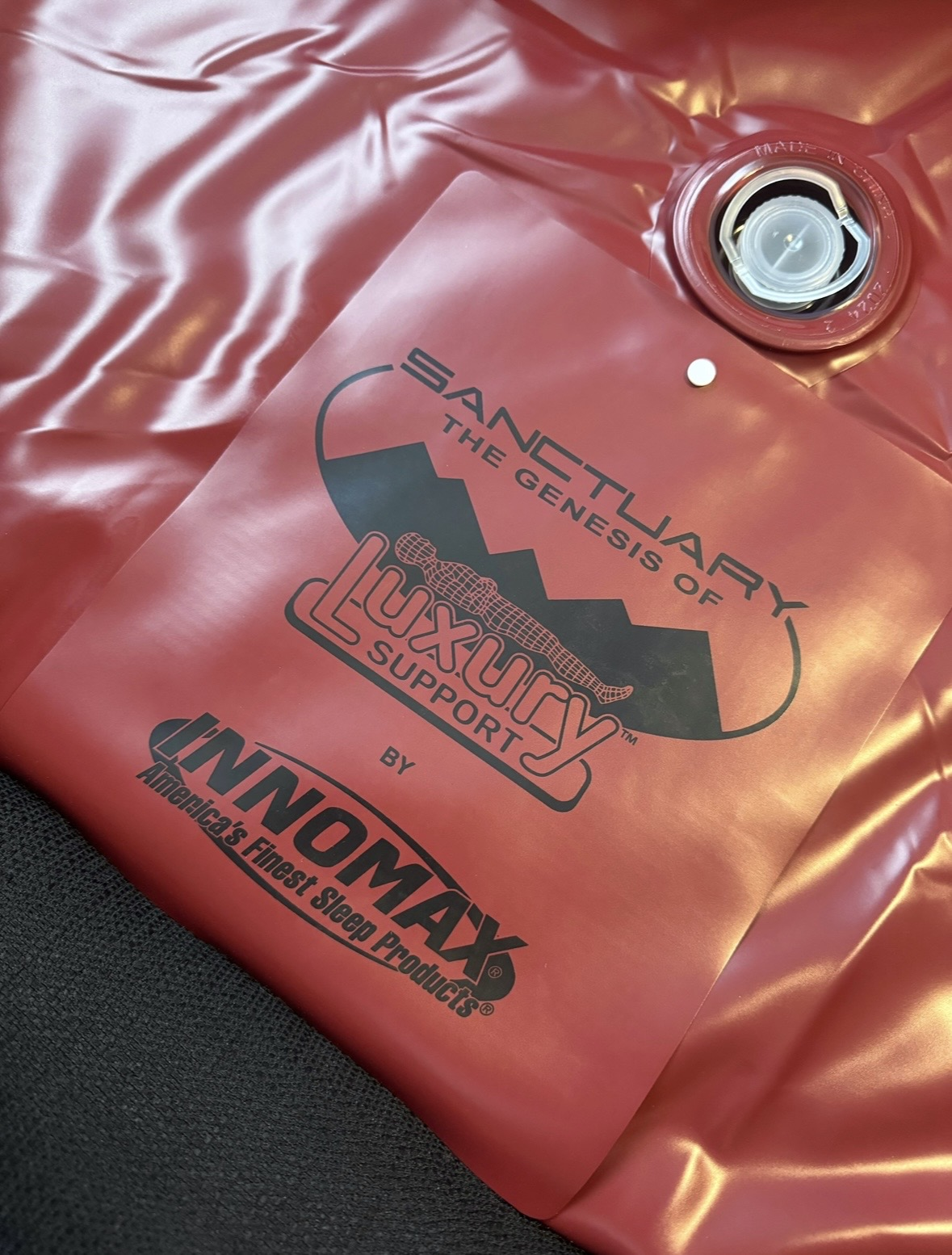
Hardside waterbed mattress fill valve and padded rails

=== Safety liners ===
A safety liner is placed beneath the water mattress to contain leaks and prevent damage to the frame or surrounding furniture. Liners are made from a thick vinyl and are designed to wrap upward around the interior sides of the frame or cavity. In the event of a puncture or seam failure, the liner holds the released water for the mattress to be drained, patched or replaced, reducing the risk of floor damage. Safety liners are required for all hardside and softside waterbeds.

=== Heaters ===
Waterbeds incorporate an electric heater to regulate the temperature of the water mattress. Heating units are placed beneath the bladder and controlled by an adjustable thermostat that allows precise temperature control, typically between 26 and 32 °C (78–90 °F). A stable temperature is essential for comfort and helps prevent condensation within the mattress. Some waterbeds may use two heaters in dual-chamber systems, allowing each side to maintain a separate temperature. In the event of a power outage, the bed loses its heat source, causing the temperature to drop gradually over time. The rate of cooling depends on factors such as room temperature, insulation, and bedding.

Heating a waterbed contributes to household energy consumption, typically using between 300 and 1,500 kWh per year (approximately US$36–180 at 12¢ per kWh), with actual costs varying depending on factors such as climate and bed size.

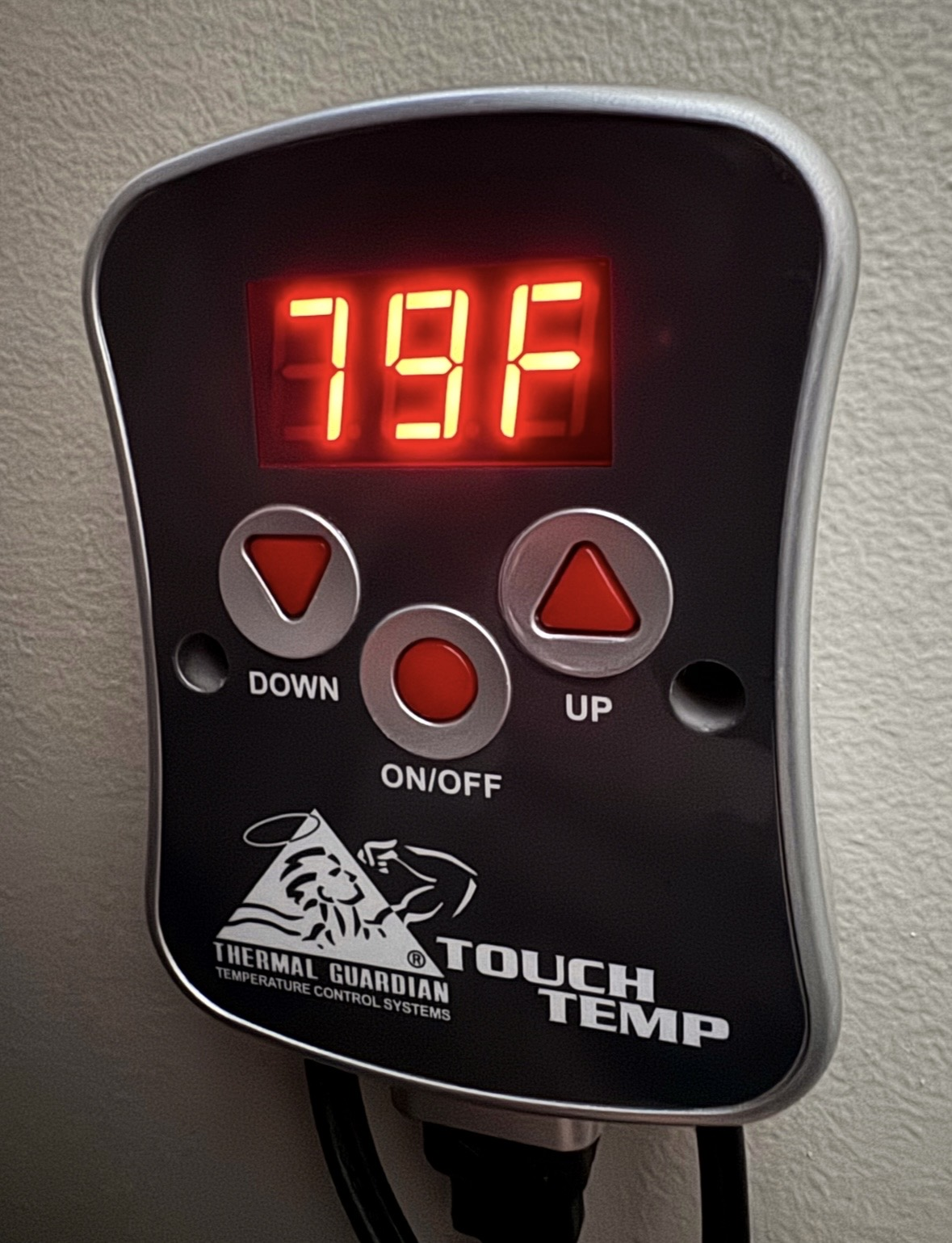
Waterbed heater thermostat control

=== Water conditioners ===
Water conditioners are added to the mattress to prevent the growth of bacteria and algae and to keep the vinyl material supple. These conditioners also help control odor and reduce gas buildup inside the bladder. Most manufacturers recommend adding a conditioner every 6 to 12 months to maintain water quality and extend the life of the mattress. Some conditioner formulas include agents that reduce air bubbles, easing the air removal process after filling.

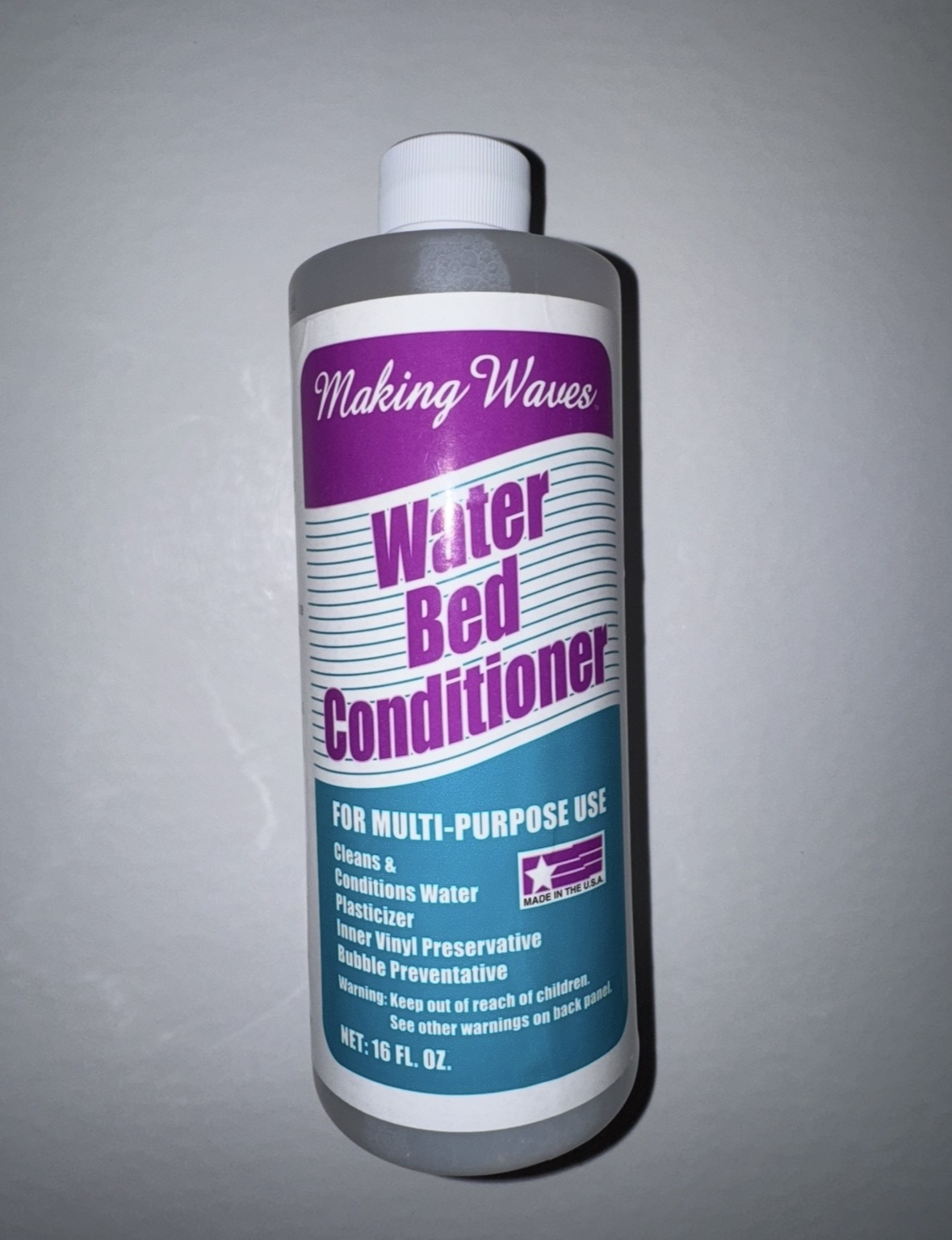
A bottle of waterbed conditioner

=== Filling and draining ===
Waterbeds can be filled or drained using a hose connected to a household tap via a faucet adapter, relying on water pressure to gradually fill the mattress. For draining, a siphoning attachment connected to the faucet allows water to be removed naturally. Alternatively, an electric pump can be used to actively push water in or out of the mattress, speeding up the process and improving efficiency, especially with larger beds. These tools make it possible to adjust the water level, relocate the bed, or perform maintenance.

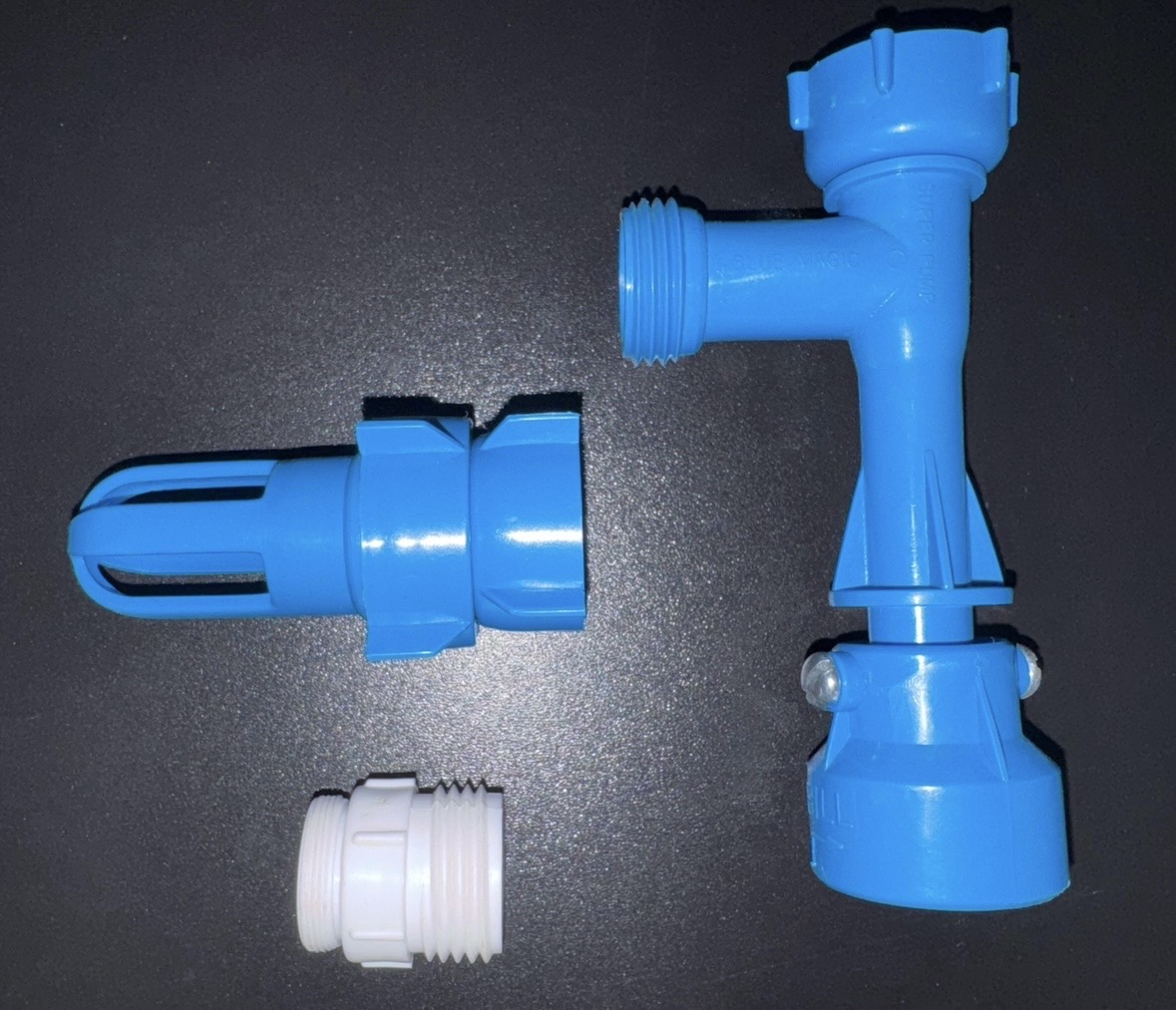
Waterbed fill and drain attachments

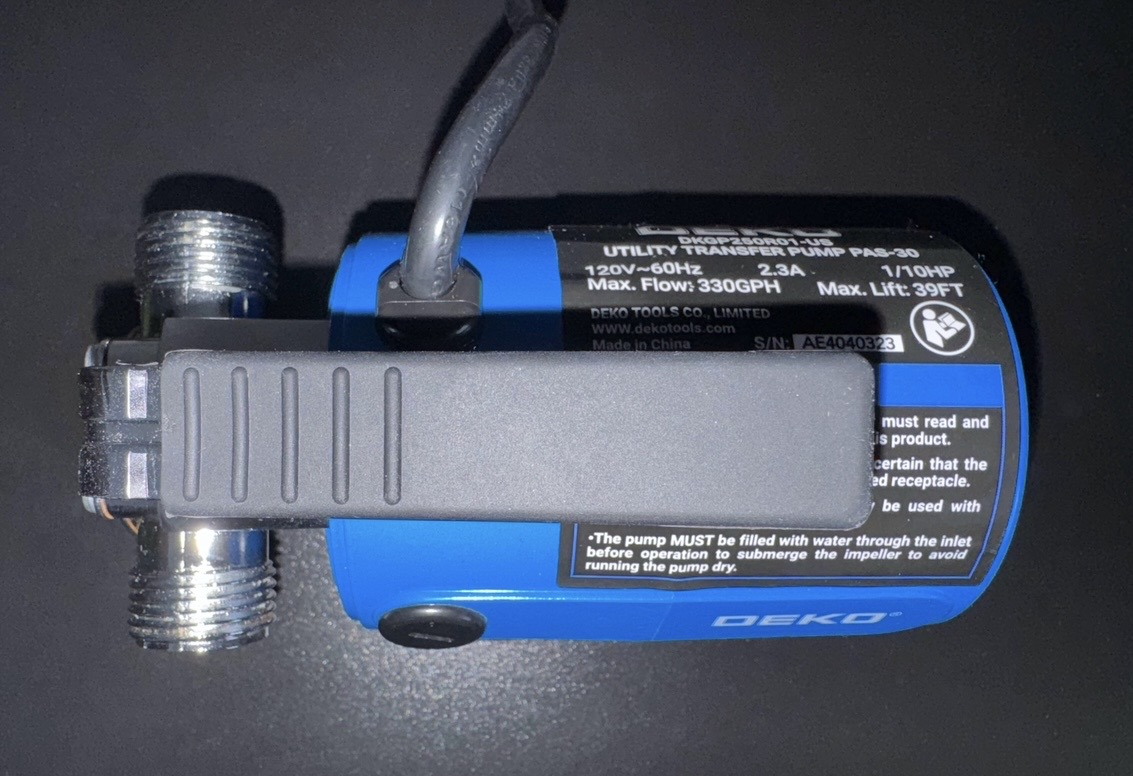
Waterbed fill and drain pump

=== Features and safety considerations ===
The waterbed can be comfortable and supportive for many. Its most attractive feature is the form-fitting, pressure-relieving design. This not only adds to overall comfort, but reducing pressure on the spine can provide relief for those with back pain. Additionally, the even weight distribution can help prevent bedsores in individuals who are paralyzed or immobile. Other features include temperature control, letting users keep the bed warm during cold nights or cool in warmer seasons. In addition, they are easy to clean: the surface can be wiped down with a cloth and vinyl cleaner. The mattress cover can be removed and washed regularly. However, The National Institute of Child Health and Human Development warns that the form-fitting nature of a waterbed poses a danger to infants, providing a possibility of asphyxiation.

== History ==
=== The Neil Arnott hydrostatic bed ===
A form of waterbed was invented in 1833 by the Scottish physician Neil Arnott. Dr. Arnott's Hydrostatic Bed was devised to prevent bedsores in patients, and comprised a bath of water with a covering of rubber-impregnated canvas, on which lighter bedding was placed. Arnott did not patent it, permitting anyone to construct a bed to this design.

The use of a waterbed (for the ailing Mrs. Hale) is mentioned in Elizabeth Gaskell's 1855 novel North and South.

On May 18, 1863, a proposal for waterbed supplies was posted to newspapers by the USA Medical and Hospital Department, Medical Purveyor's Office, Washington D.C. The proposal requested a supplier for "water-beds, India Rubber Rubber Cushions, for air or water".

In 1871, a waterbed was in use in Elmira, New York, for "invalids". It was briefly mentioned by Mark Twain in his article "A New Beecher Church", which was published in The New York Times on July 23, 1871. Twain wrote: "In the infirmary will be kept one or two water-beds (for invalids whose pains will not allow them to be on a less yielding substance) and half a dozen reclining invalid-chairs on wheels. The water-beds and invalid-chairs at present belonging to the church are always in demand, and never out of service".

A newspaper classified want ad in 1877 requested "AN INDIA RUBBER Water-bed. 3 feet by 2 feet, new or second hand. Call immediately at 1,222 Broadway."

The protagonist Graham is placed on a waterbed in a glass case during his coma of 203 years in the 1898 H. G. Wells novel "The Sleeper Awakes".

=== Heinlein descriptions ===
Science fiction writer Robert A. Heinlein described therapeutic waterbeds in his novels Beyond This Horizon (1942), Double Star (1956), and Stranger in a Strange Land (1961). In 1980, Heinlein recalled in Expanded Universe:

I designed the waterbed during years as a bed patient in the middle thirties; a pump to control water level, side supports to permit one to float rather than simply lying on a not very soft water filled mattress. Thermostatic control of temperature, safety interfaces to avoid all possibility of electric shock, waterproof box to make a leak no more important than a leaky hot water bottle rather than a domestic disaster, calculation of floor loads (important!), internal rubber mattress and lighting, reading, and eating arrangements—an attempt to design the perfect hospital bed by one who had spent too damn much time in hospital beds.

Heinlein made no attempt to build his invention, but its first builder, Charles Hall, was denied a patent claim based on Heinlein's "prior works".

Apparently, the initial patent application by Charles Hall for the waterbed was denied as being too broad, as the device itself had been described by Heinlein in several of his novels that had been published more than 25 years prior to Hall trying to make one. Hall was later granted a patent when he modified and specified his design.

=== The Charles Hall waterbed ===
The modern waterbed was created by Charles Prior Hall in 1968, while he was a design student at San Francisco State University in California. Hall originally wanted to make an innovative chair. His first prototype was a vinyl bag chair with 300 pounds (136 kg) of cornstarch. Ultimately, he abandoned working on a chair, and settled on perfecting a bed.

Hall was granted a patent (#3,585,356) on his waterbed in 1971, which he originally called "liquid support for human bodies." The same year, he founded Innerspace Environments, a manufacturing and sales company which became the leading retailer of waterbeds in the United States, with 30 owned-and-operated stores. The patent came to trial in 1991 in Intex v. Hall /wbx. The patent was upheld in court, and Hall received a $4.8 million judgment for infringement. Hall /wbx received additional royalties from licensing. Some later lawsuits were dismissed because of laches.

In 1987, sales peaked at 22% of the domestic mattress industry. Although the waterbed was initially advertised as offering "undisturbed sleep", Hall admitted that customers "bought it for the sensual or the sexual part of it", and the sexually associated advertising was highly effective in the 1970s and early 1980s. Henry Petroski of Duke University said of the waterbed: "Not only was it the cool new gadget, but it emerged during a time when the culture embraced anything different, especially a product that embodied sexual liberation".

== See also ==
- List of inflatable manufactured goods
