= Neil Arnott =

Scottish physician and inventor (1788–1874)

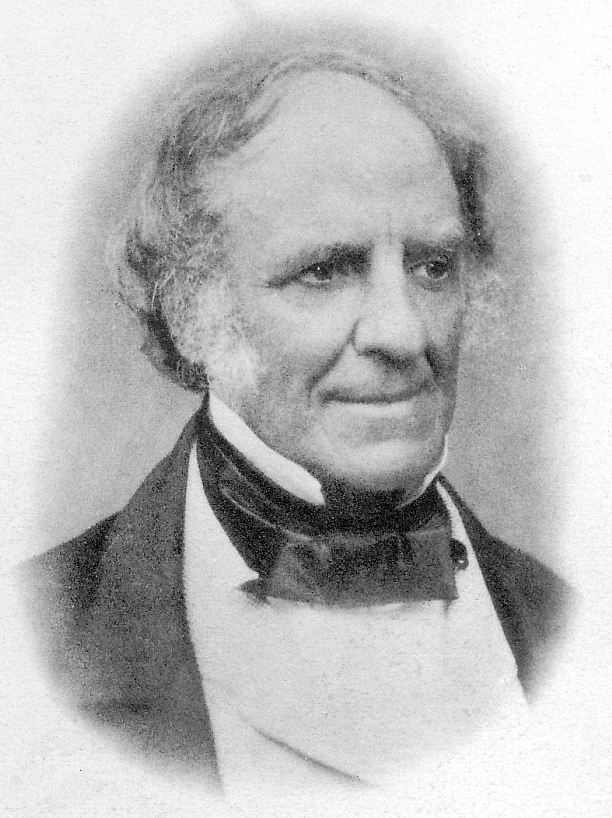
- Neil Arnott
- Born: 15 May 1788; Arbroath, Scotland
- Died: 2 March 1874 (aged 85); London, England
- Education: University of Aberdeen
- Occupation: Physician
- Awards: Rumford Medal (1854)

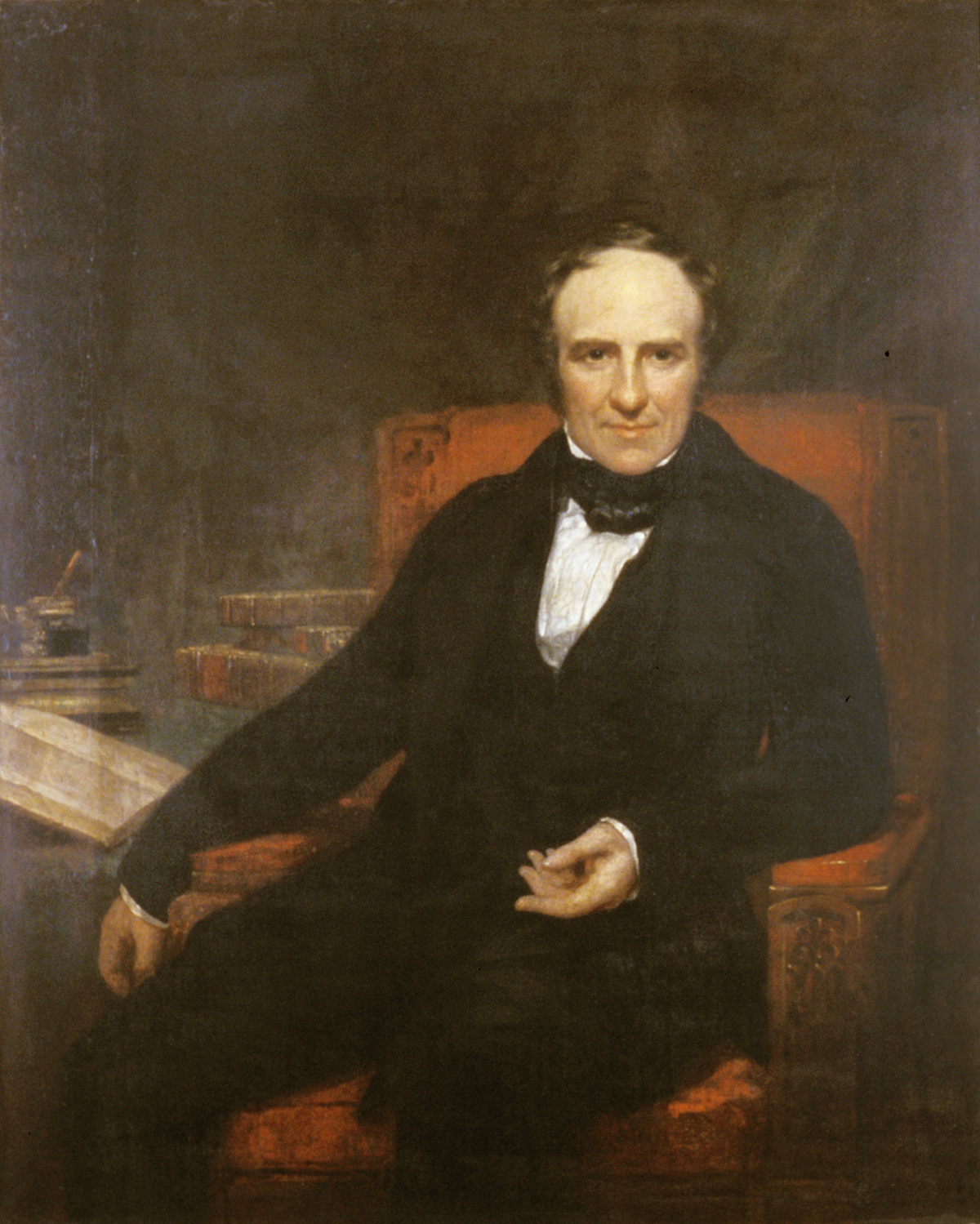
Neil Arnott by John Partridge

Neil Arnott (15 May 1788 – March 1874) was a Scottish physician and inventor. He was the inventor of one of the first forms of the waterbed, the Arnott waterbed, and was awarded the Rumford Medal in 1852 for the construction of the smokeless fire grate, as well as other improvements to ventilation and heating.

== Life ==
Neil Arnott was born in Arbroath, the son of Alexander Arnott and his wife, Ann MacLean of Borreray. He came from a line of master bakers.

Neil Arnott was a distinguished graduate of Marischal College, University of Aberdeen (AM, 1805; MD 1814) and subsequently studied in London under Sir Everard Home (1756–1832), through whom he obtained, when only eighteen, the appointment of full surgeon to an East Indiaman. After making two voyages to China acting as a surgeon in the service of the British East India Company (1807-9 and 1810–11), he settled in London where he practised from 1811 to 1854, and quickly acquired a high reputation. He gave lectures at the Philomathic Institution published as Elements of physics (1827). He was one of the founders of the University of London, 1836. Within a few years he was made physician to the French and Spanish embassies, and in 1837 he became physician extraordinary to the Queen. He was elected to the Fellow of the Royal Society (FRS) in 1838.

He was a strong advocate of scientific, as opposed to purely classical, education; and he manifested interest in natural philosophy by the gift of 2,000 pounds to each of the four universities of Scotland and to the University of London, to promote its study in the experimental and practical form.

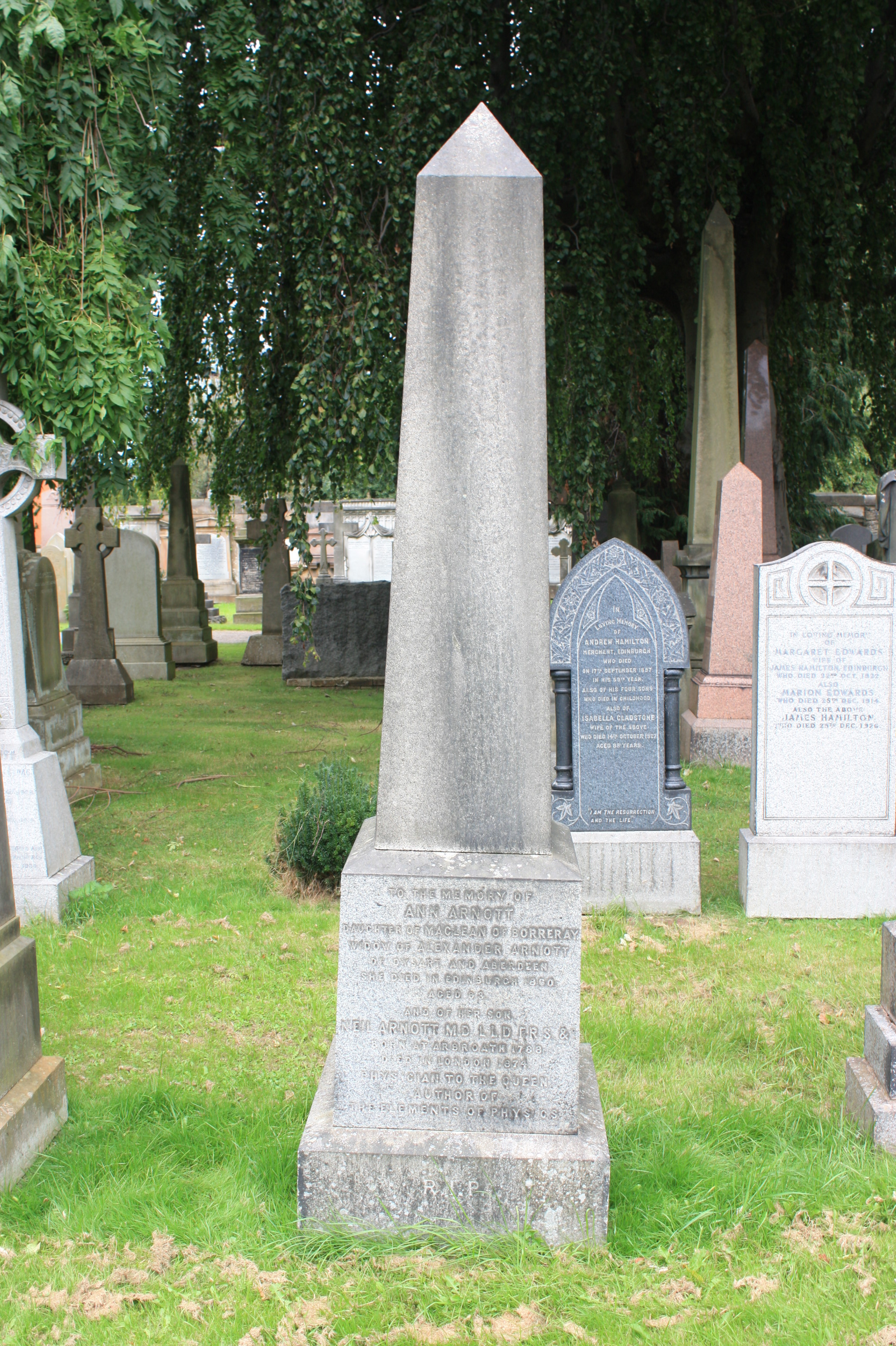
The grave of Neil Arnott FRS, Dean Cemetery, Edinburgh

He died in London in 1874 but is buried with his mother in Dean Cemetery in Edinburgh. The simple obelisk lies in the north-west section of the original cemetery, west of the large Beattie obelisk.

== Publications ==
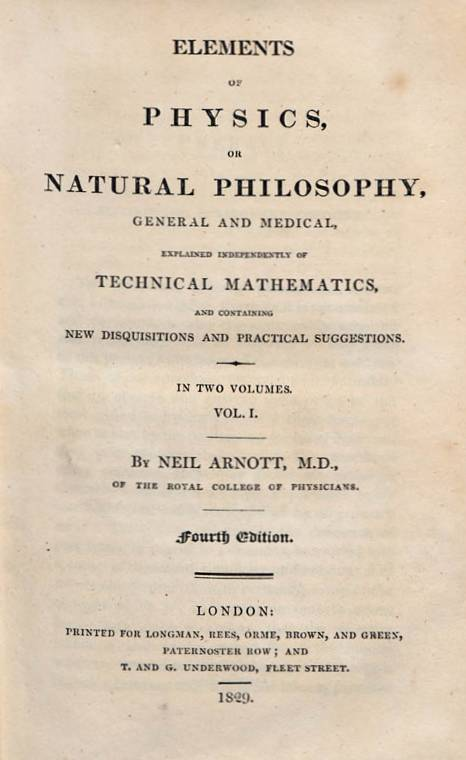
Elements of physics, 1829

He was the author of several works on physical science or its applications, the most important being his Elements of Physics (1827), which went through six editions in his lifetime. In 1838 he published a treatise on warming and ventilating, and in 1855, one on the smokeless fireplace.

- Elements of Physics (1827)
  - Elements of physics. Vol. 1. London: Longman & Rees & Orme & Brown & Green. 1829.
  - Elements of physics. Vol. 2. London: Longman & Rees & Orme & Brown & Green. 1829.
  - Elements of Physics (Philadelphia: Blanchard & Lea, 1856) (US edition, with additions by Isaac Hays)
- On the Smokeless Fire-place, Chimney-valves, and Other Means, Old and New of obtaining Healthful warmth and ventilation (London: Longman, Green, Longman & Roberts, 1855)
- A Survey of Human Progress (London: Longman, Green, Longman & Roberts, 1861)

== View on health and causes of disease ==
Arnott was a strong advocate for a natural view of health and on the causes of various diseases. In his paper "On the Fevers Which Have Prevailed Edinburgh and Glasgow," Arnott noted "It gives remarkable simplicity to all inquiries respecting health, to know that among the things and influences around man on earth, in regard to which he can exercise control, there are only four which he needs to obtain, and two which he needs to avoid, that he may have uninterrupted health for as long as the human constitution is formed to last; in other words, that only by some want or misuse of the requisites, or by the direct agency of the noxious agencies can his health be impaired or his life be shortened." Arnott believed that the four items that needed to be obtained in order to be healthy were fit air, temperature, aliment, and exercise of the mind and of the body, and that if an individual had access to all four of these items, while avoiding violence and poisons (items that Arnott believed caused disease and therefore were to be avoided), that the individual would have no issues when it came to health throughout their life and would be able to live for as long as the body permits one to live, and that by surrounding oneself with the four essential items, the human bodily makeup would slowly become modified by "kindred circumstances not deemed diseases but called temperaments and varieties, compatible with health and long life." Arnott also referenced the findings of the report made to the Poor Law Commissioners in his paper Sanitary Inquiry-Scotland, and regarded the contents of this report as facts, making note of the claim that malaria was caused by the exhalation released during putrefaction or decomposition of animal and vegetable substances.

== Inventions ==
From his earliest youth, Arnott had an intense love of natural philosophy, and to this added an inventiveness which served him in good stead in his profession. This inventiveness helped him to design the Arnott waterbed in the 19th century that was devised to prevent bedsores in invalids. The bed was composed of a bath of water with a covering of rubber-impregnated canvas, on which lighter bedding was placed. However, Arnott didn't patent his design, and without a patent, anyone was able to construct a bed in this design. The design was later developed into a water-filled chair intended to prevent seasickness. Other inventions include the Arnott ventilator and the Arnott stove.
