= Robert Arnott (academic) =

British medical archaeologist (1951-2024)

- Born: 1951; Watford, England
- Died: 31 August 2024 (aged 72–73)
- Education: University College London
- Scientific career
- Fields: History and Archaeology of Medicine

Robert Arnott (born 1951 in Watford, died 31 August 2024) was a British medical archaeologist and historian. Arnott was sub-dean of medicine, director of the Centre for the History of Medicine (which he founded), and, unusually, director of the Institute of Medical Law in the University of Birmingham Medical School, until his early retirement in 2008. He was succeeded as director of the Centre for the History of Medicine by the medical historian Dr Jonathan Reinarz. He was also a visiting lecturer and module director for the Special Studies Programme in Ancient Medicine at the Oxford University Medical School.

Robert Arnott was director of the Birmingham Medical Institute and regional sub-dean of the Royal Society of Medicine. He was also a vice-president of the Society for Ancient Medicine and a Fellow of the Royal Historical Society.

His research interests and most of his publications, which include five books and over sixty papers, centre on disease and medicine in the Aegean and Anatolian Bronze Ages. A conference in his honour, organised by Aegeus, the society for Aegean prehistory, will be held in November 2025.

== Selected works ==
- Arnott, Robert; Finger, Stanley; Smith, C. U. M., eds. (2002). Trepanation: discovery, history, theory. Swets & Zeitlinger. ISBN 90-265-1923-0.
- Robert, Arnott (2022). Crossing continents: between India and the Aegean, from prehistory to Alexander the Great. Oxford: Oxbow Books. doi:10.2307/j.ctv13pk8f6. ISBN 9781789255546.
- Robert, Arnott (2024). Disease and Healing in the Indus Civilisation. Archaeopress. doi:10.32028/9781803277387. ISBN 9781803277387.
