= James Fullarton Arnott =

James Fullarton Arnott (29 April 1914 – 22 November 1982) was a Scottish professor, author, and theatrical director.

Arnott was born in Glasgow, Scotland, on 29 April 1914. His parents were Hezekiah Merricks Arnott and Susie Willock Fullarton. He attended the Ardrossan Academy. Arnott graduated from the University of Glasgow with a Master of Arts in 1936. He went on to attend Merton College, Oxford, where he received his Master of Letters, and Peterhouse, Cambridge. He also studied at the Royal Scottish Academy of Music and Drama. James Fullarton Arnott died in 1982.

== Career ==
After teaching at Hull University, Arnott became an assistant lecturer in the English department at the University of Glasgow in 1939. In 1952, he directed a production of Murder in the Cathedral. In 1962, Arnott became a senior lecturer at Glasgow. He then directed Shakespeare's comedy Love's Labour's Lost in 1964. That same year he also became an editor of the journal that would later become known as Theatre Research International. In 1966, Arnott became the first head of the drama department at Glasgow. He went on to direct several plays, including the Play of Daniel and Curlew River in 1968 and The Forrigan Reel in 1970. He wrote English Theatrical Literature 1559-1900 in 1970.

The University of Glasgow granted Arnott the rank of reader in 1971 and professor in 1973. He served as president of the International Federation for Theatre Research from 1975 through 1979. Arnott also served as the chairman of the drama committee of the Scottish Arts Council from 1976 through 1979. He was a member of the Arts Council of Great Britain from 1977 through 1979. From 1980 until his death in 1982, Arnott was a member of the UK National Commission for UNESCO. The University of Glasgow renamed its chair of drama the "James Arnott Chair" in 1996.
