= Geoffrey H. Arnott =

- Born: Geoffrey Harold Arnott; 4 February 1902; Waratah, New South Wales, Australia
- Died: 3 April 1986 (aged 84)
- Education: Newington College
- Occupation: Company director
- Known for: Chairman of Arnott's Biscuits Holdings

Geoffrey Harold Arnott (4 February 1902 – 3 April 1986) was an Australian company director and chairman of Arnott's Biscuits. Arnott was born in Waratah, New South Wales, and attended Newington College from 1918 to 1920.

== Business career ==
Geoffrey Arnott worked at Arnott's starting in 1921, where he began in the factory as part of the engineering shop. He moved to the administrative side 10 years later, and assisted with the provision of food supplies during World War II to Australian and Allied forces. He became the managing director in 1954 and a chairman in 1961, which he remained until retiring in 1975.
