= List of peanut dishes =

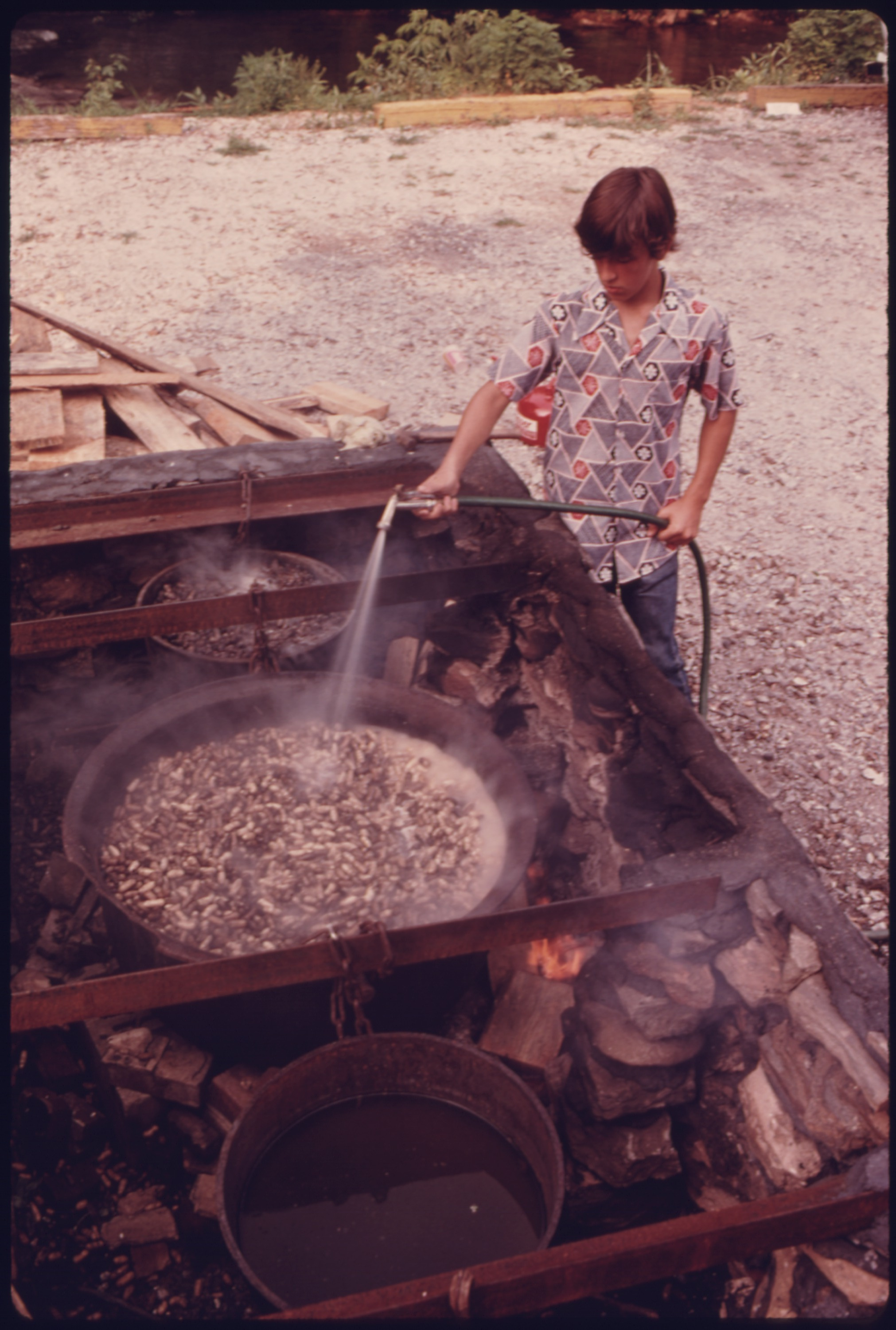
Boiled peanuts being prepared in Helen, Georgia, c. 1974

This is a list of peanut dishes and foods that are prepared using peanuts or peanut butter as a primary ingredient. Peanuts are also referred to as groundnuts.

== Dishes and foods ==
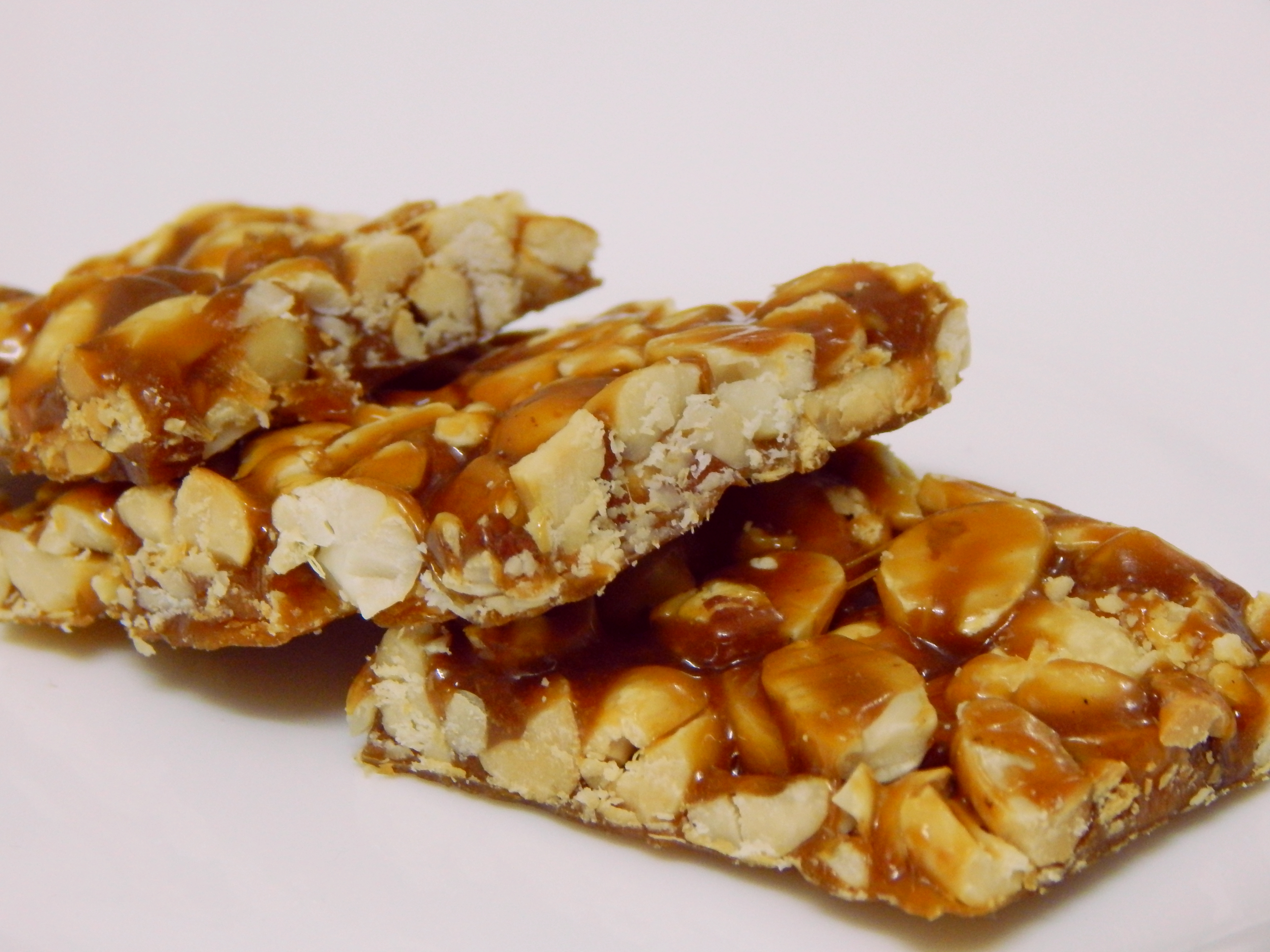
Peanut chikki

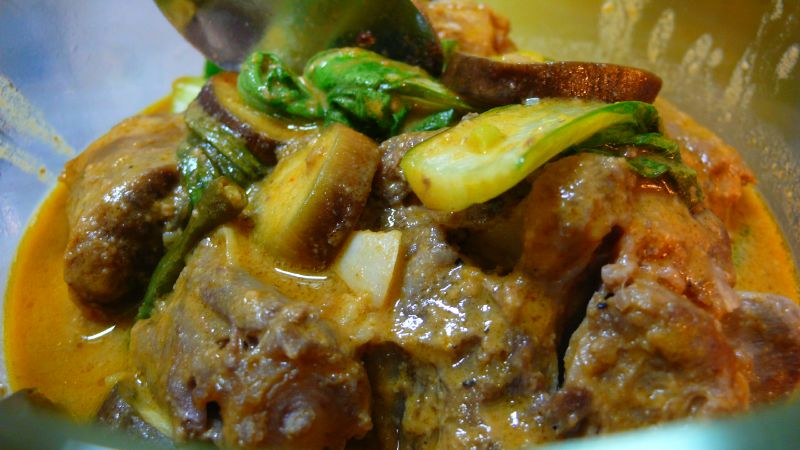
Kare-kare

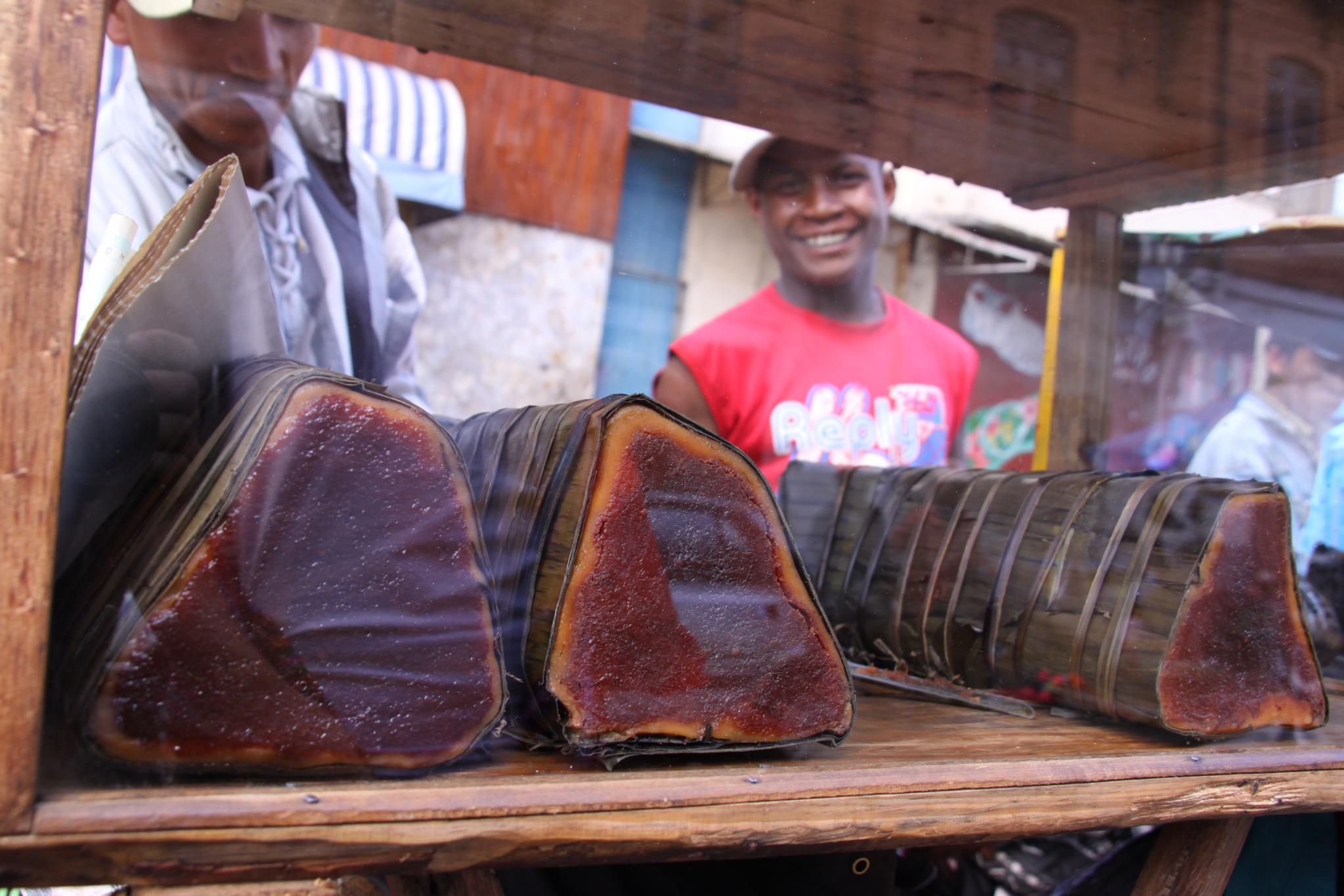
Thick, dark brown rolls of koba, a peanut pâté wrapped in banana leaves. Here it is being sold by street vendors in Antananarivo, Madagascar.

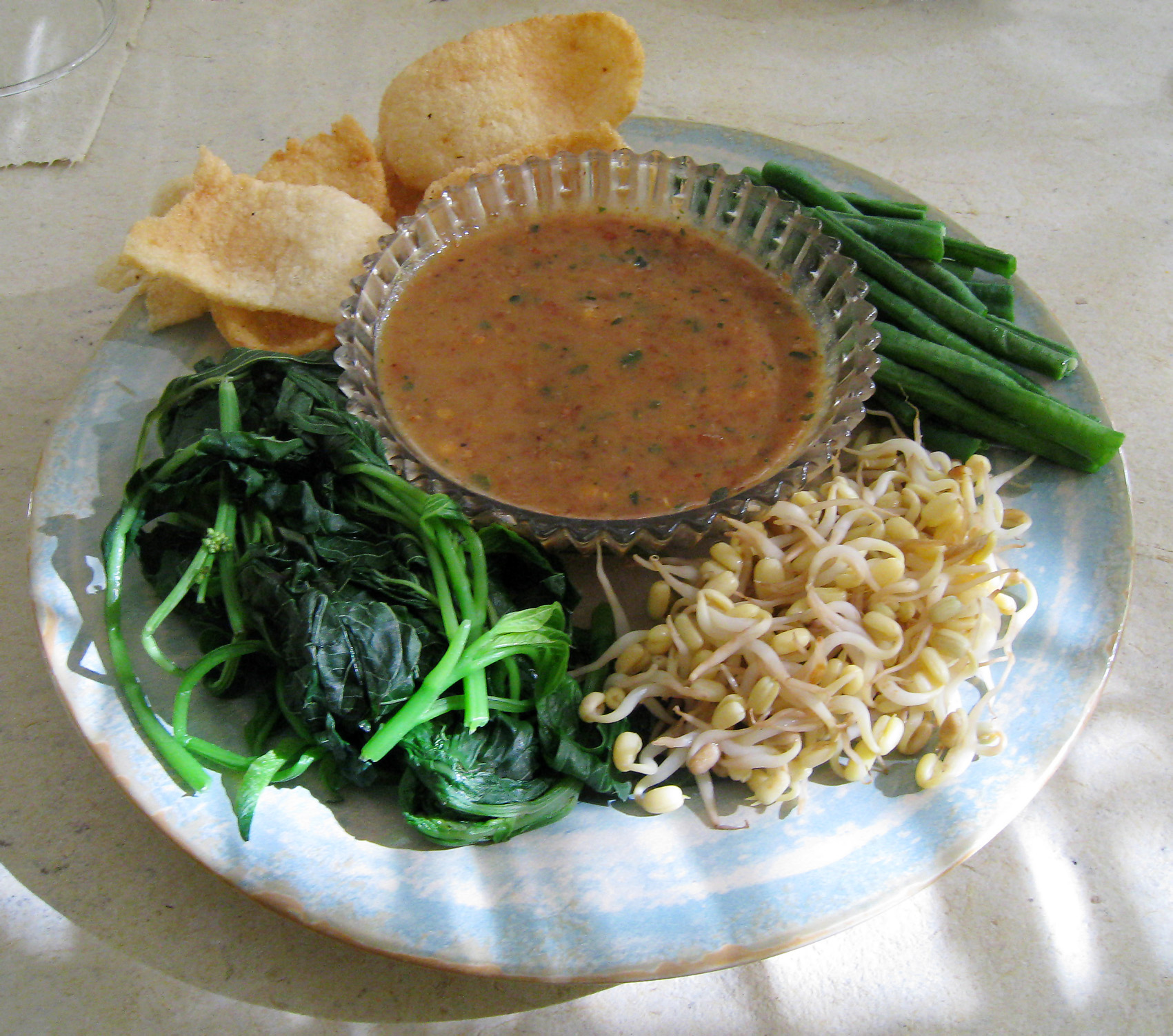
Peanut sauce with various foods

- Ants on a log – a snack made by spreading peanut butter, cream cheese, ricotta cheese or any number of spreads on celery and placing raisins on top
- Bamba – a snack food prepared using liquid peanut butter as an ingredient
- Beer nuts – a generic description in Australia, of roasted, salted peanuts sold shelled but unhusked and not sweetened. In the United States, "Beer Nuts" (capitalized) is a brand of snack food building on an original product of peanuts with a "unique" sweet-and-salty glazing made to a "secret recipe".
- Boiled peanuts – a snack food in various areas of the world
- Chikki – a traditional Indian sweet generally made from peanuts and jaggery. There are several different varieties of chikki in addition to the most common groundnut chikki.
- Chocolate-coated peanut – peanuts coated in a shell of chocolate
- Citadel spread – a food paste made with peanut butter, oil, sugar and milk powder. First developed as a trail food for hikers, a Citadel Spread resembles common ready-to-use therapeutic food (RUTF) formulations, such as Plumpy'nut.
- Confetti square – is a dessert bar prepared with peanut butter, marshmallows, and butterscotch chips.
- Cracker nuts – is a snack food produced with peanuts that are coated in a wheat flour dough and then fried or deep-fried. In the Philippines, Nagaraya is the most popular brand of cracker nuts.
- Deep-fried peanuts – a snack food created by deep frying peanuts in an oil
- Garrapinyades – vanilla-flavored sugar candied peanuts are popular snacks in Argentina and Uruguay, especially among kids.
- Goober – a commercial product that is a combination of peanut butter and jelly in a single jar, introduced by The J.M. Smucker Company under the Smucker's brand
- Honey-roasted peanuts – a popular salt, sugar and honey flavored peanut snack
- Hunan dumplings – a dish featuring wontons in a peanut butter sauce
- Kare-kare – a Philippine stew complemented with a thick savory peanut sauce
- Koba – a sweet made from ground peanuts, brown sugar and rice flour
- Maafe – a stew or sauce made from lamb, beef, chicken, or without meat and cooked with a sauce based on groundnuts
- Mirchi ka salan – a popular chili and peanut curry of Hyderabad, Telangana, India
- Nutter Butter – a Nabisco brand peanut-shaped sandwich cookie with a peanut butter filling
- Nutty Buddy – a snack manufactured by McKee Foods under the brand title of Little Debbie, it consists of four wafers sandwiched together in a peanut butter mixture and covered in chocolate
- P.B. Slices – a company that produced P.B. Slices brand sliced peanut butter squares, which were sold in individually wrapped slices
- Peanut brittle – a confection consisting of flat broken pieces of hard sugar candy embedded with peanuts
- Peanut butter bun – sweet bun found in Hong Kong as well as various Chinatown bakery shops
- Peanut butter – a food paste or spread made from ground dry roasted peanuts
- Peanut butter cookie – peanut butter is a principal ingredient in this cookie
- Peanut chutney – a mildly spicy chutney side dish that can be used with several snack foods and breakfast foods
- Peanut flour – made from crushed, fully or partly defatted peanuts
- Peanut ice cream roll – traditional Taiwanese vegetarian snack made up of a thin wheat-based wrapper filled with shaved peanut brittle bound with malt sugar, ice cream scoops, and fresh cilantro
- Peanut oil – a mild-tasting vegetable oil derived from peanuts
- Peanut paste – a product of peanuts and is used as an ingredient in sauces, cookies, crackers (and other baked goods), breakfast cereals and ice cream
- Peanut pie – a pie prepared with peanuts or peanut butter as a primary ingredient
- Peanut sauce – also referred to as satay sauce, it is a sauce made from ground roasted or fried peanuts, widely used in the cuisines of Indonesia, Malaysia, Thailand, Vietnam, China, Suriname and Africa. It is used as an ingredient in various dishes.
  - Gado-gado – an Indonesian salad of slightly boiled, blanched or steamed vegetables and hard-boiled eggs, fried tofu and tempeh, and lontong (rice wrapped in a banana leaf), served with a peanut sauce dressing
  - Karedok – a raw vegetable salad dressed in peanut sauce from West Java, Indonesia,
  - Ketoprak – a vegetarian dish from Jakarta, Indonesia that consists of tofu, vegetables, rice cake and rice vermicelli served in peanut sauce
  - Llapingacho – fried potato cakes that originated in Ecuador, they are usually served with a peanut sauce
  - Pecel – a traditional Javanese salad, consisting of mixed vegetables in a peanut sauce dressing
    - Nasi pecel – a Javanese rice dish served with pecel
  - Satay bee hoon – a dish invented by the Teochew people who immigrated to Singapore, it is a chilli-based peanut sauce very similar to the one served with satay
  - Sega lengko – a typical cirebonese dish consisting of fried tempeh, fried tofu, cucumbers, bean sprouts, leaves of chives, fried onions and peanut sauce
- Peanuts and Coke
- Peanut soup – a soup made from peanuts, often with various other ingredients
- Pé de moleque – a soft, dark brown sweet, made from the mixture of peanuts and rapadura or molasses, traditional from São Paulo cuisine
- Plumpy'nut – a peanut-based paste in a plastic wrapper for treatment of severe acute malnutrition manufactured by a French company, Nutriset.
- Rempeyek – peyek kacang, deep-fried savoury Javanese cracker made from peanuts, spices and other ingredients bound or coated by crispy flour batter.
- Scotcheroos – dessert bars prepared with chocolate, butterscotch, peanut butter, and Rice Krispies
- Smoki – snack food from Serbia, made from puffed cornmeal grits with addition of peanuts
- Space Food Sticks – presently available in two flavors, peanut butter and chocolate, they are sold at flight museums such as the Kennedy Space Center and the Smithsonian Air & Space Museum as well as online.
- Zowey – West African snack made of peanut paste, sugar, and ginger, and powdered maize flour
Peanut dishes and foods

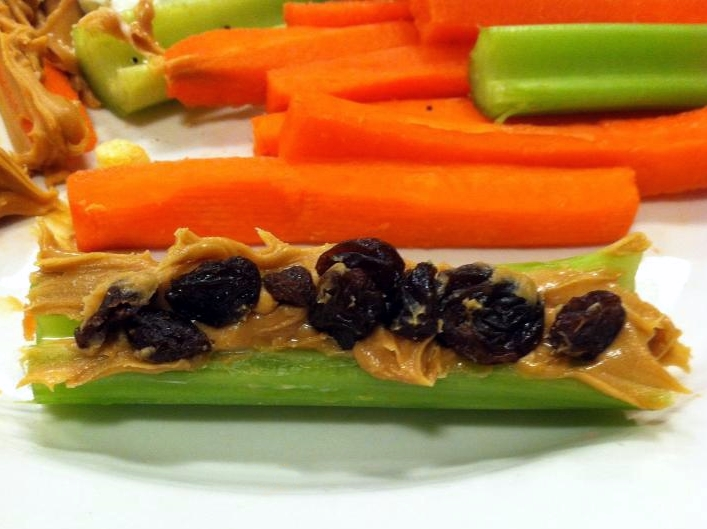
Ants on a log prepared using peanut butter

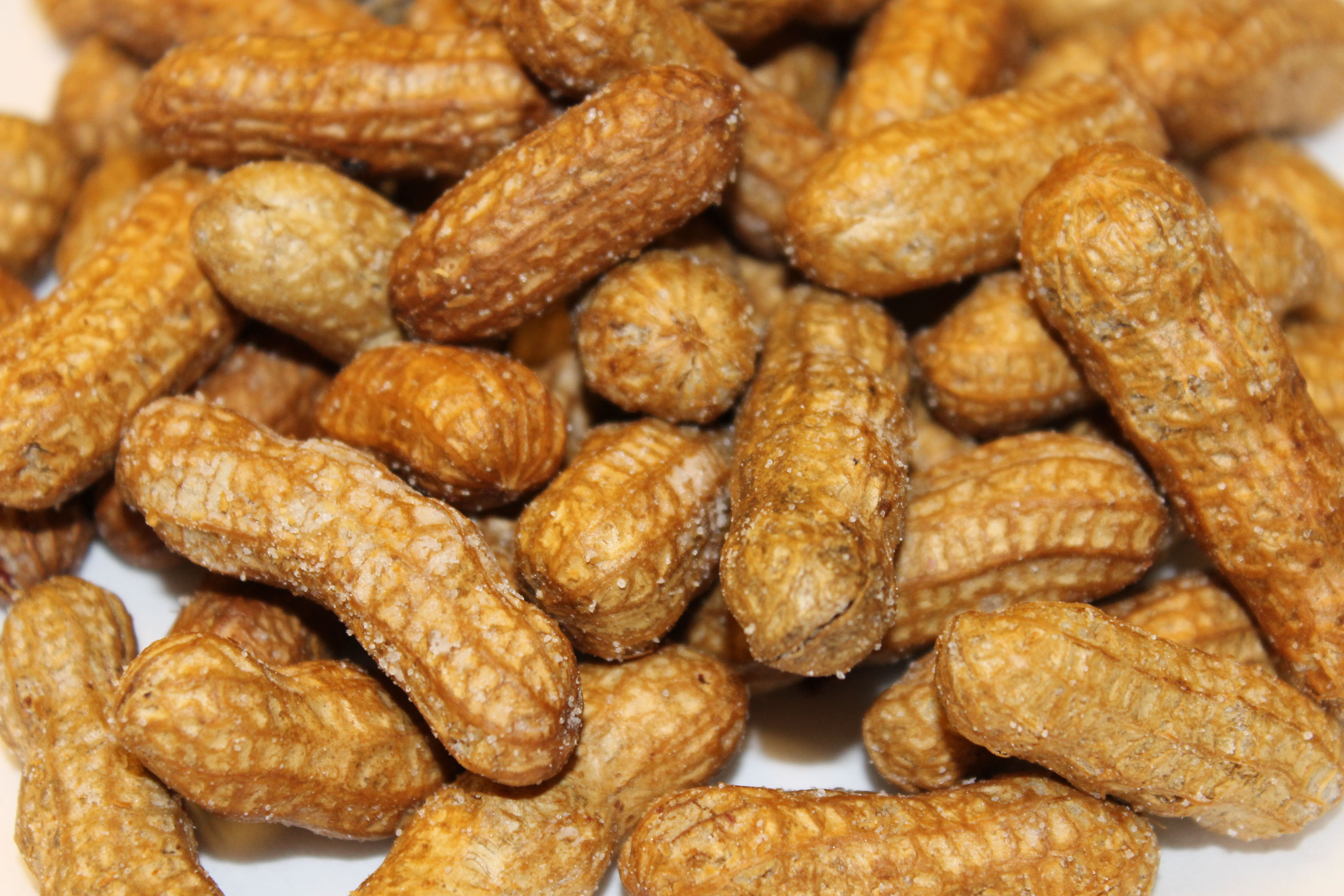
Deep-fried peanuts

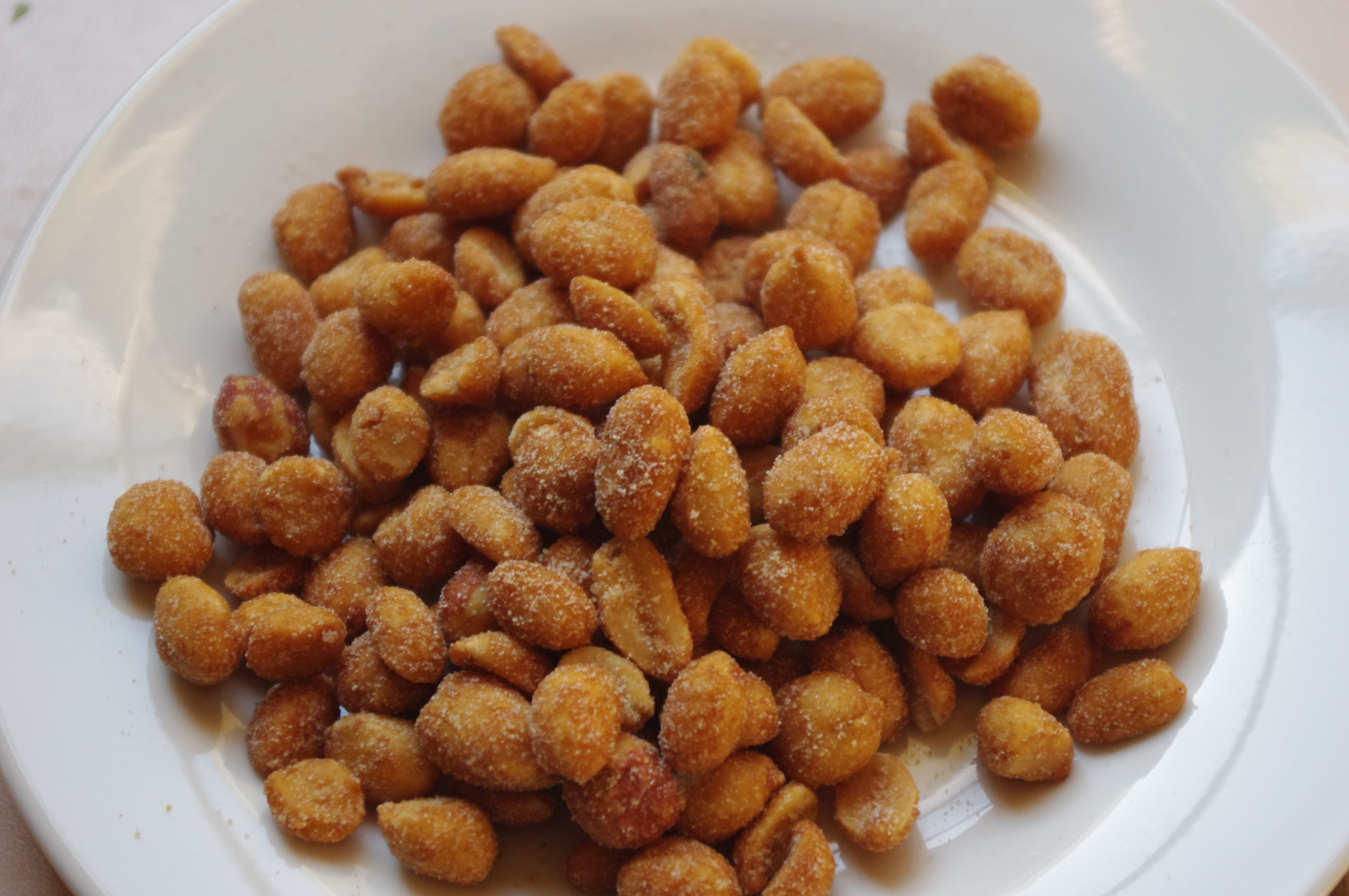
Honey roasted peanuts

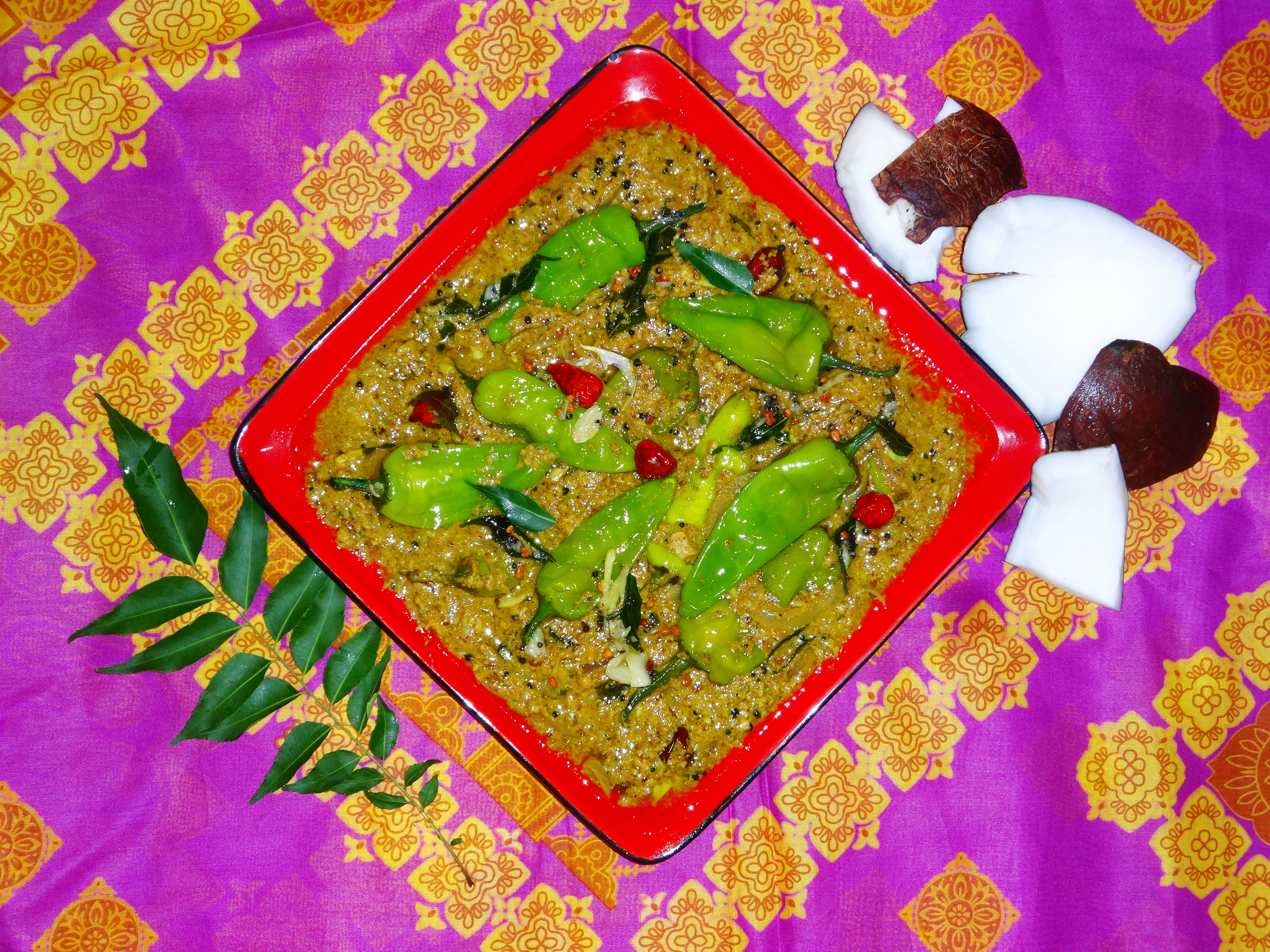
Mirchi ka salan

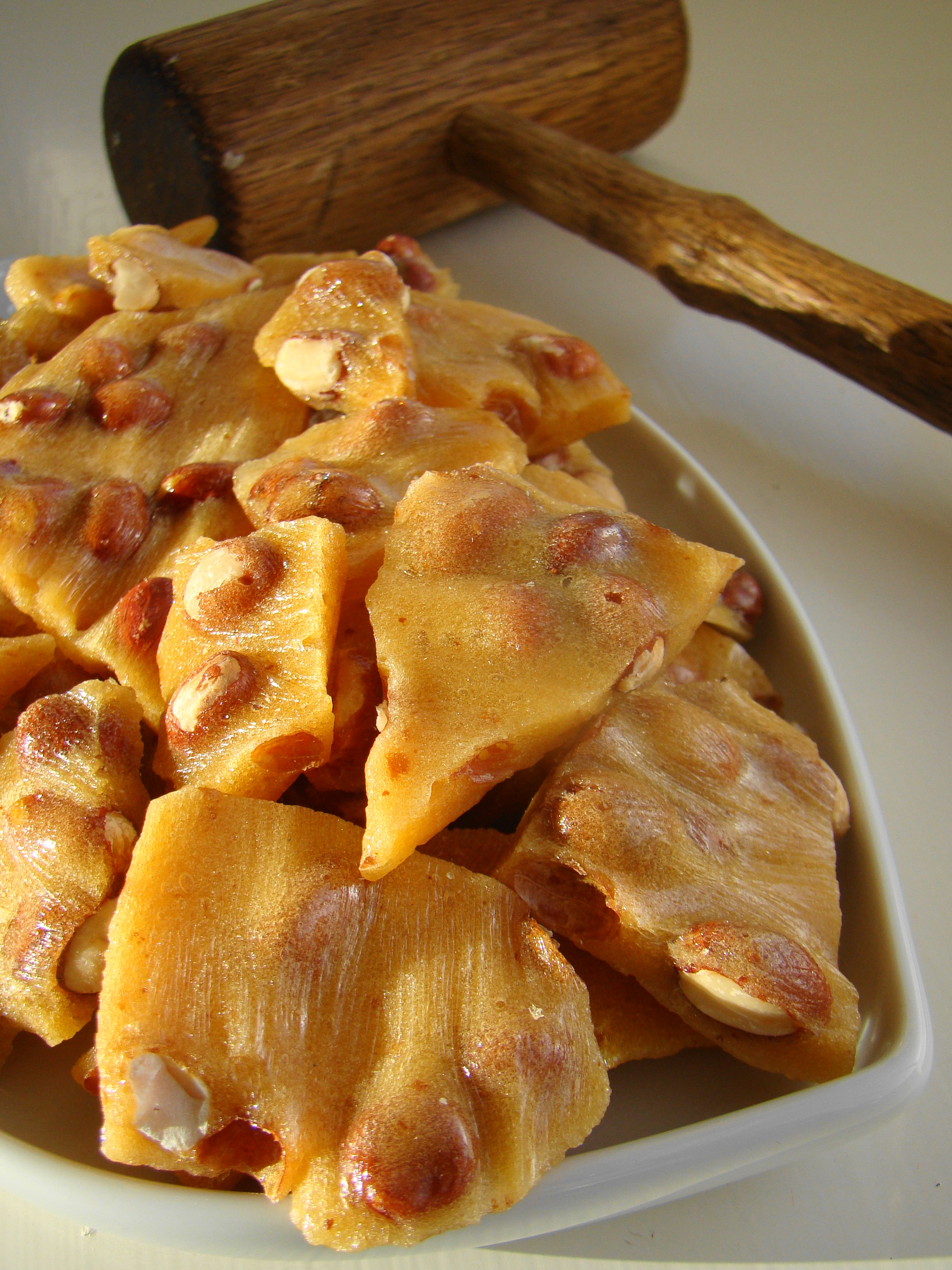
Peanut brittle cracked on a serving dish

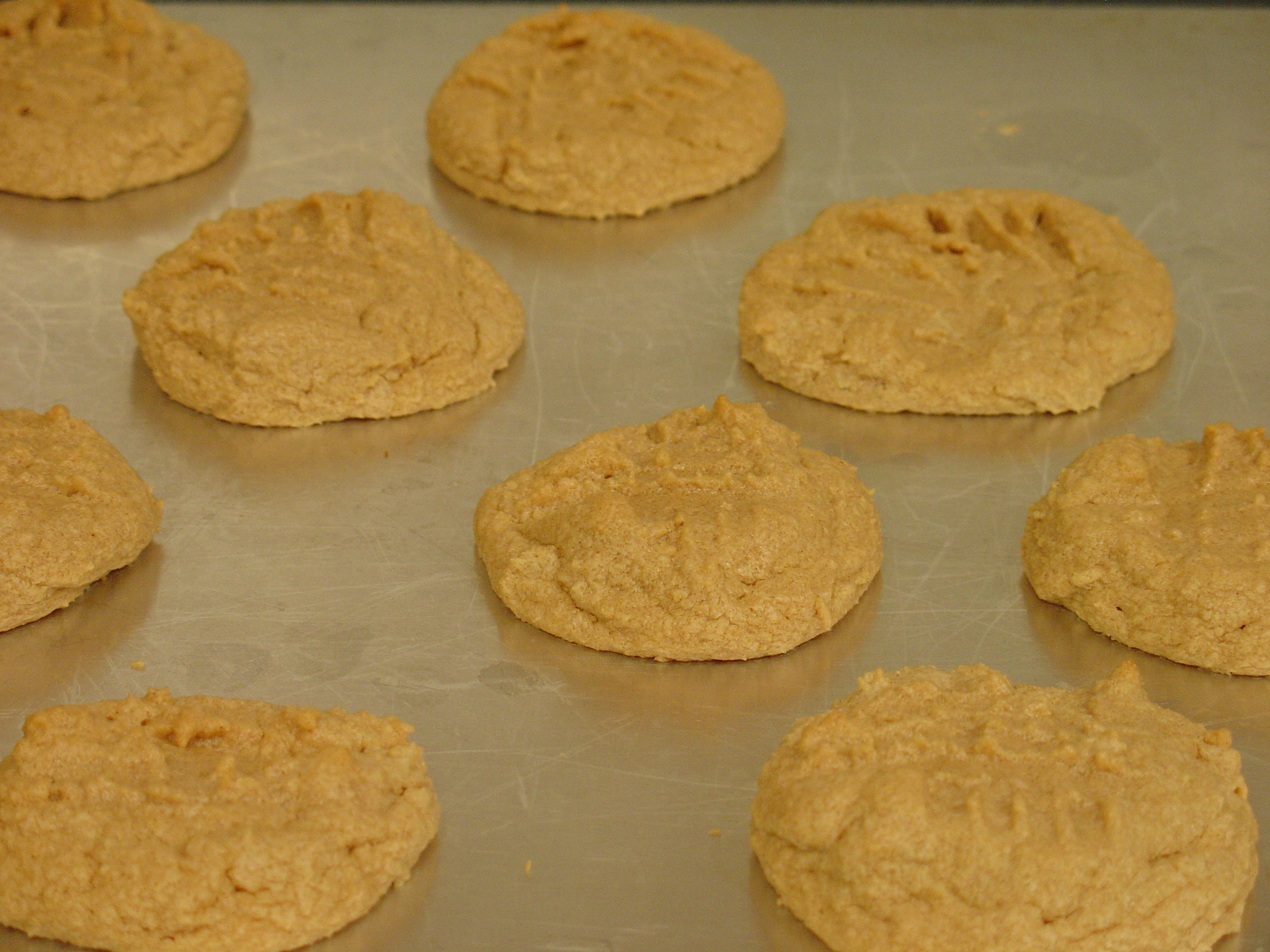
Peanut butter cookies

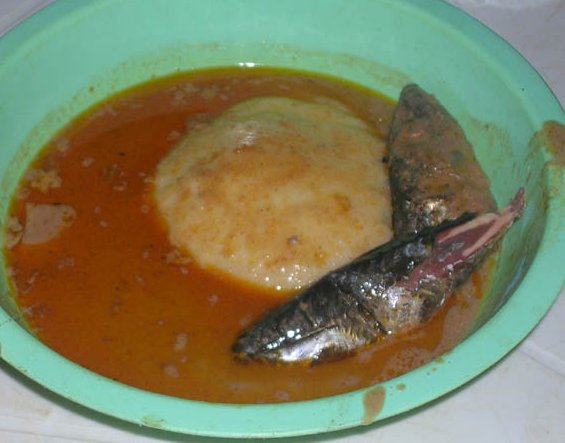
A peanut soup with fufu and fish

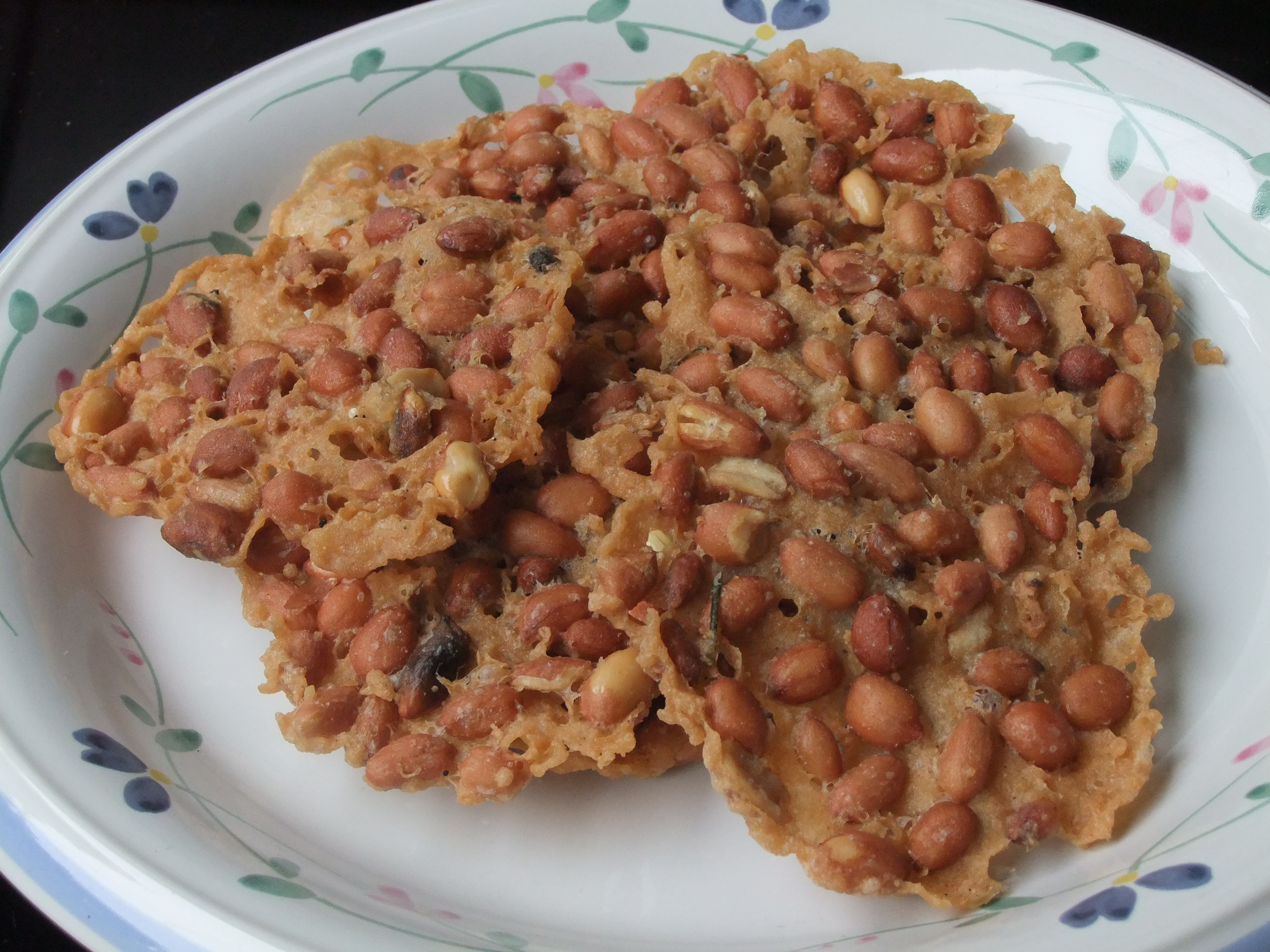
Peanut rempeyek

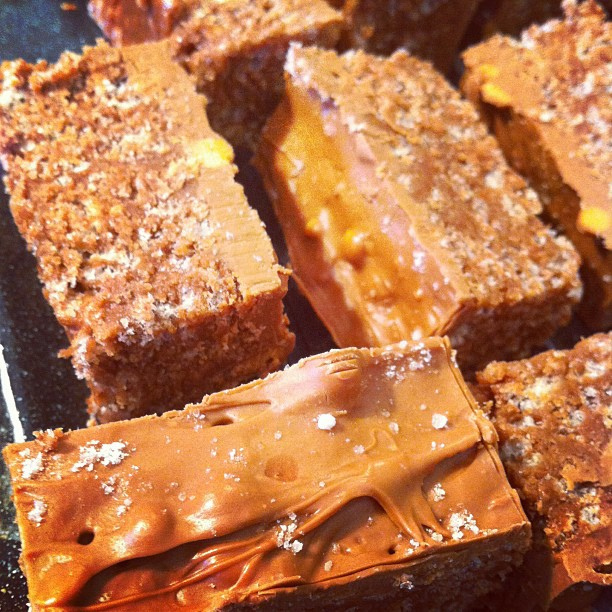
Scotcheroos

== Beverages ==
- Peanut butter whiskey – peanut-flavored whiskey
- Peanut liqueur – a liqueur produced using peanuts
- Peanut punch – a beverage popular in the Caribbean, it is made with peanut butter, milk, sugar and sometimes spices

== Candies ==
The following candies and candy bars use peanuts as a main ingredient.

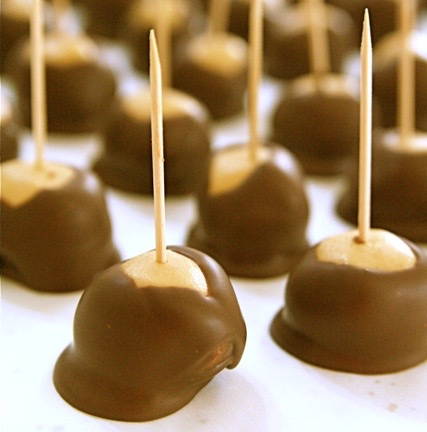
Buckeye candy

- Buckeye candy – a confection made from a peanut butter fudge partially dipped in chocolate to leave a circle of peanut butter visible
- Mary Jane – a taffy-like candy
- M&M's – varieties are produced that are filled with peanuts and peanut butter
- Nkatie cake – a Ghanaian sweet made with peanuts and melted sugar
- Peach Blossoms – a candy made by Necco that contains peanut butter wrapped in a crunchy shell
- Peanut butter cup – a molded chocolate candy with a peanut butter filling inside
  - Reese's Peanut Butter Cups – a popular American candy marketed by The Hershey Company
- Potato Candy Pinwheels - a rolled confection using a combination of mashed potatoes and powdered sugar to make a dough, usually filled with peanut butter

=== Candy bars ===
- 5th Avenue – American candy bar
- Abba-Zaba – Candy bar
- Baby Ruth – American candy bar
- Butterfinger – Candy bar
- Chick-O-Stick – Peanut butter confectionery
- Clark Bar – Candy bar
- Crispy Crunch – Canadian chocolate bar
- Goldenberg's Peanut Chews – Chocolate and peanut candy bar product
- Goo Goo Cluster – Candy company in Nashville
- Mountain Bar – American chocolate bar
- Mr. Goodbar – Chocolate candy bar
- NutRageous – Chocolate bar by The Hershey Company
- Oh Henry! – American candy bar
- PayDay – Candy bar containing peanuts and caramel
- PB Max – a former candy bar
- Peanut Butter Bars – by Atkinson Candy Company
- Reese's Crispy Crunchy Bar
- Reese's Pieces
- Reese's Sticks
- Reese's Whipps
- Salted Nut Roll
- Sky Bar – produced since 1938 by Necco, it has four sections, each with a different filling: caramel, vanilla, peanut and fudge, all covered in milk chocolate
- Snickers
- Starbar
- Take 5
- Whatchamacallit – from 1987 to 2008, it utilized peanut butter as the flavoring agent for the crisp part of the bar
  - Thingamajig – a limited edition of the Whatchamacallit bar that is no longer produced
- Zagnut
Candy bars

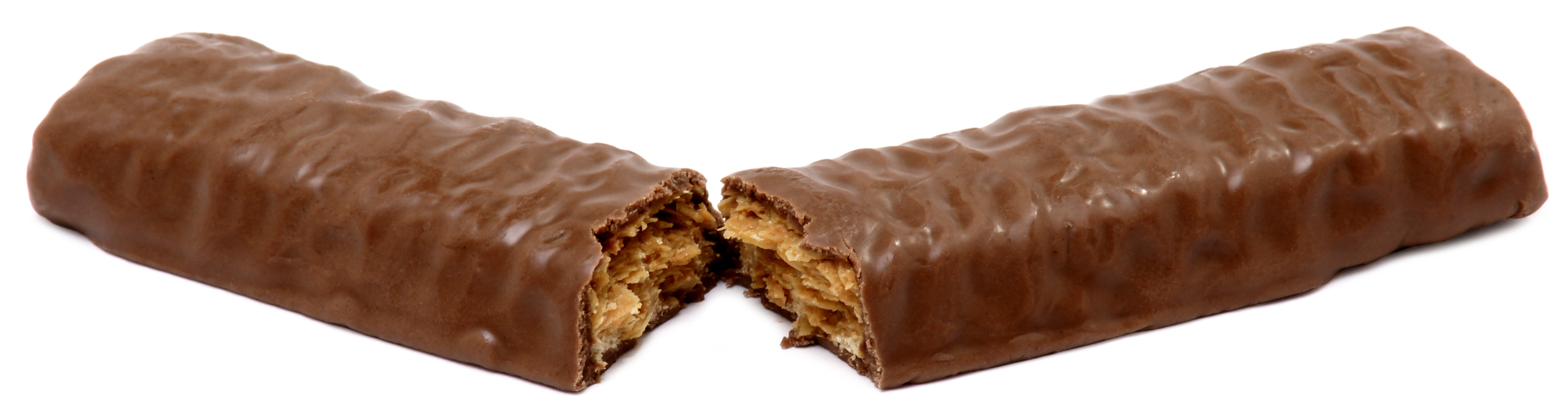
A split 5th Avenue bar

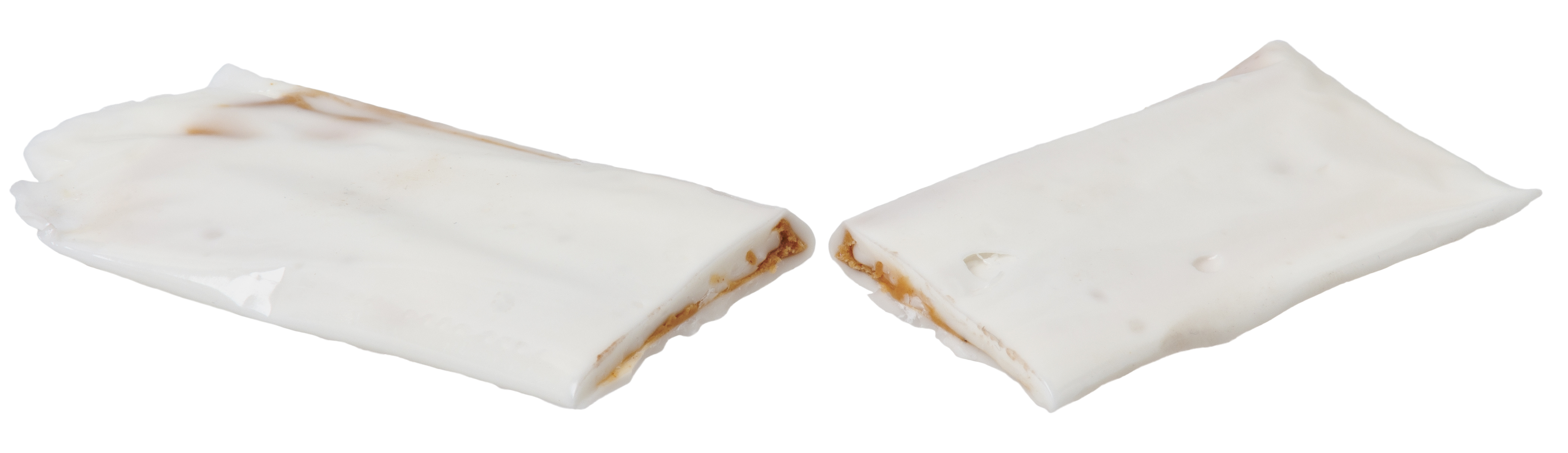
A split Abba-Zaba

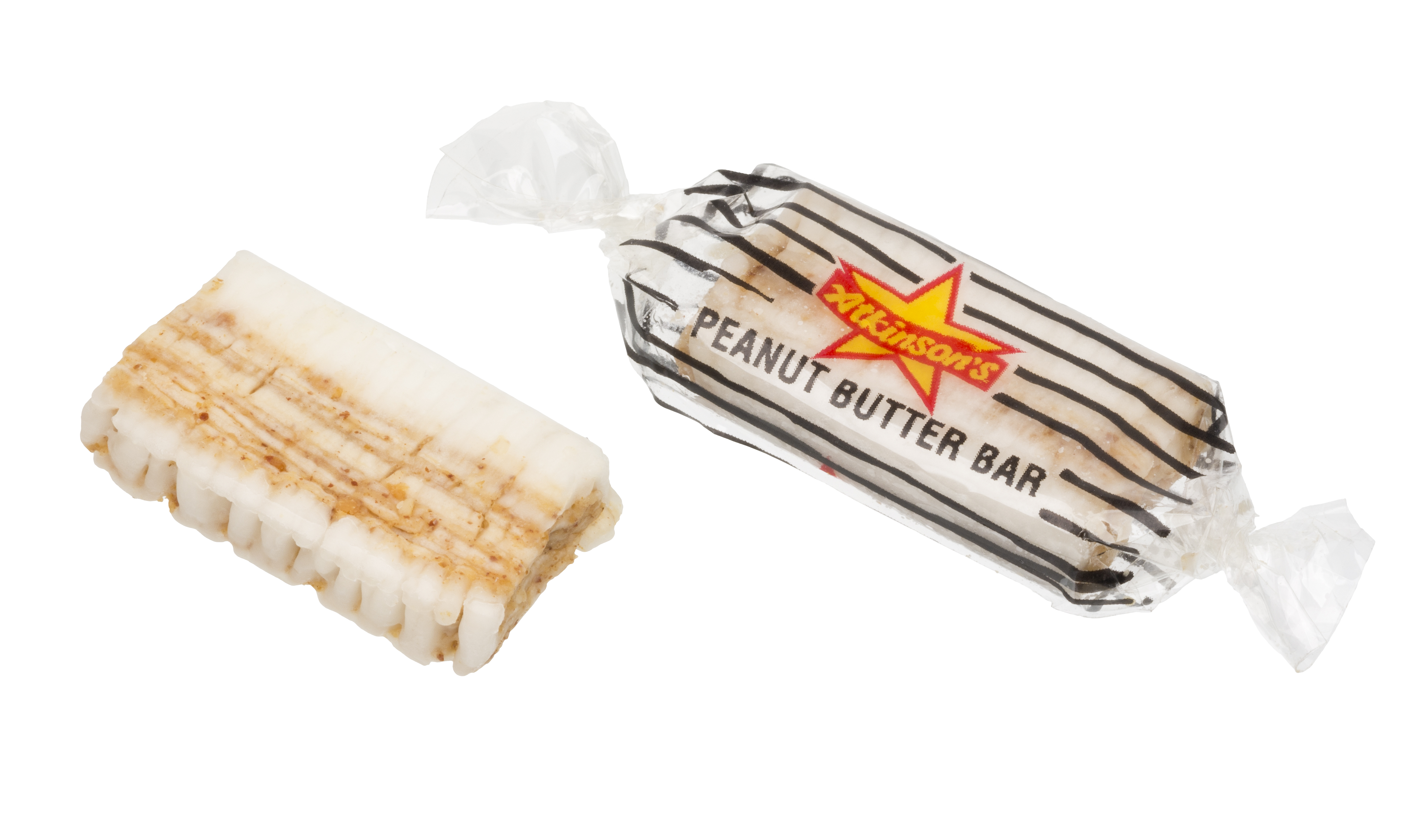
Peanut Butter Bars

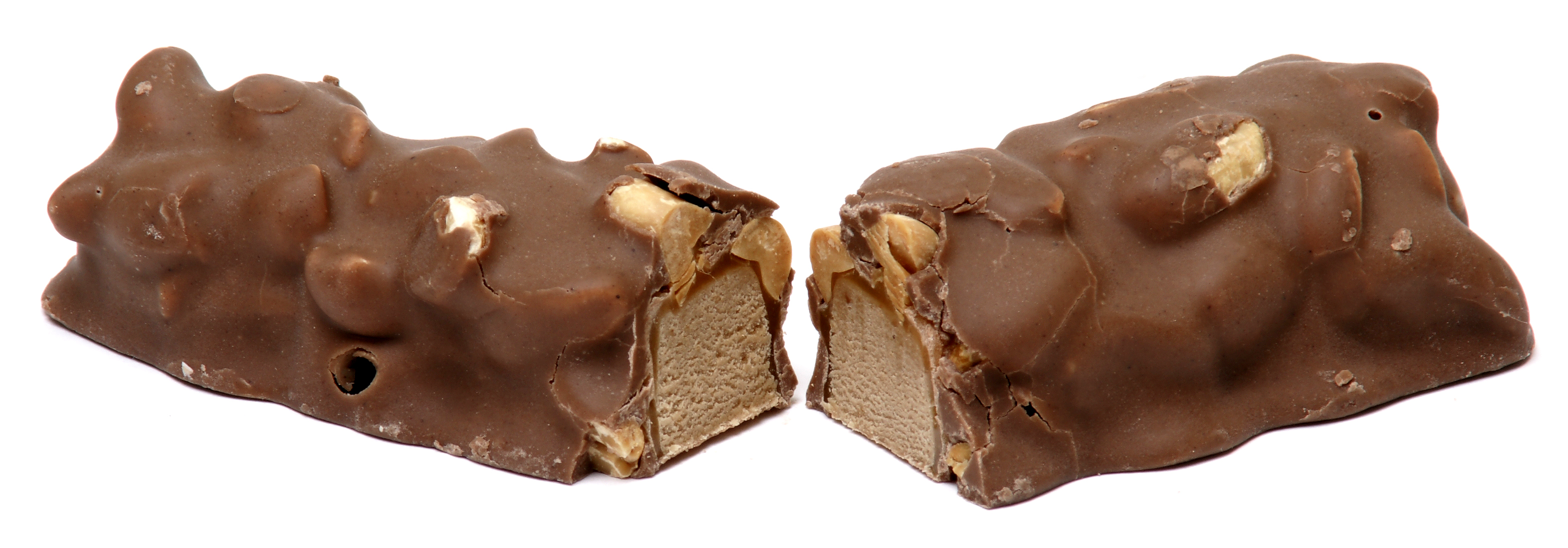
A split Baby Ruth bar

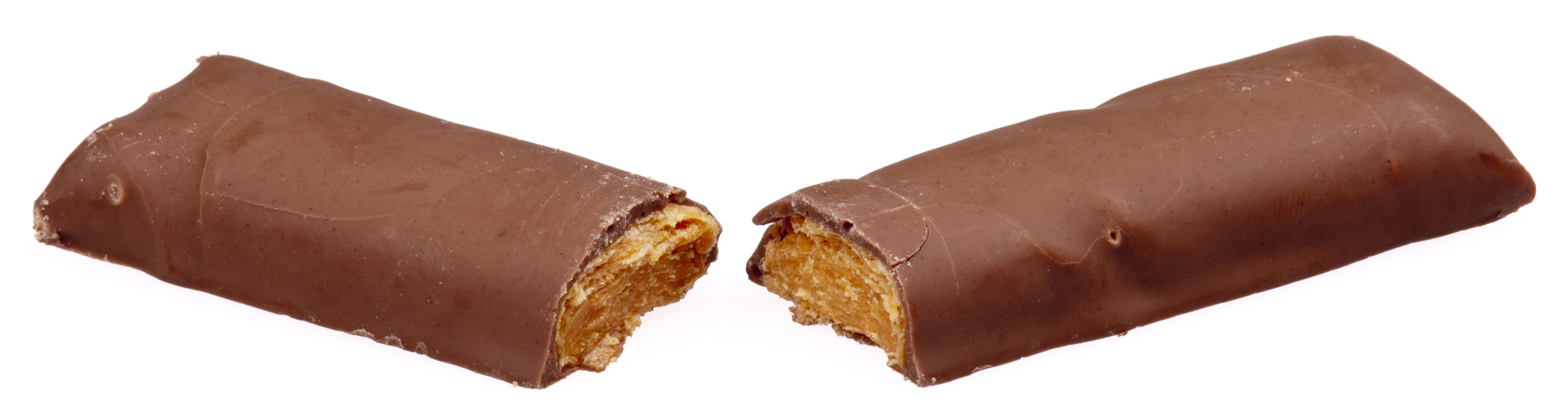
A split Butterfinger bar

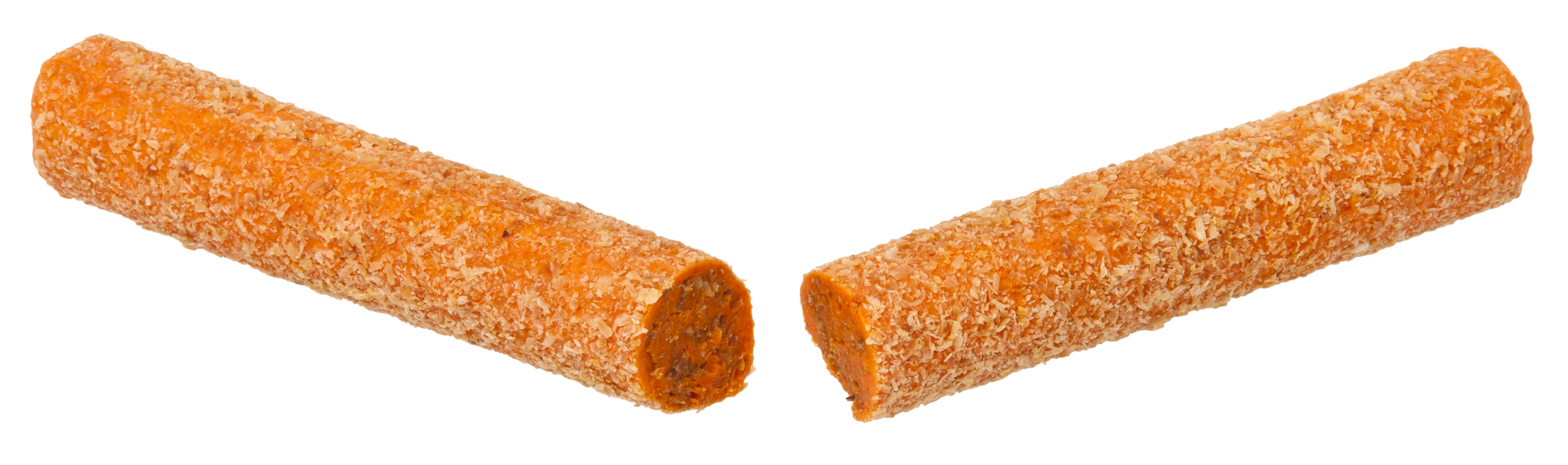
A split Chick-O-Stick

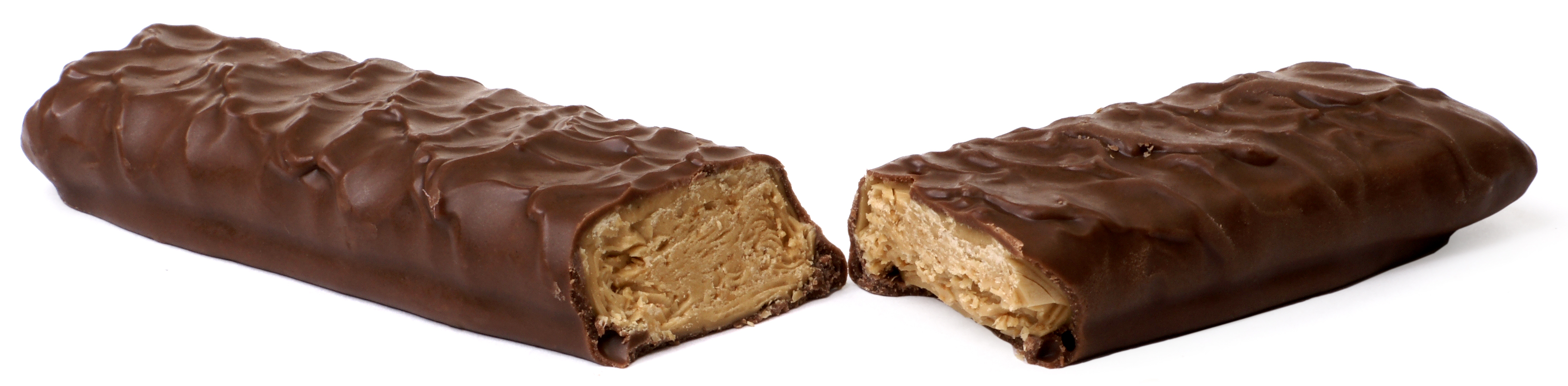
A split Clark Bar

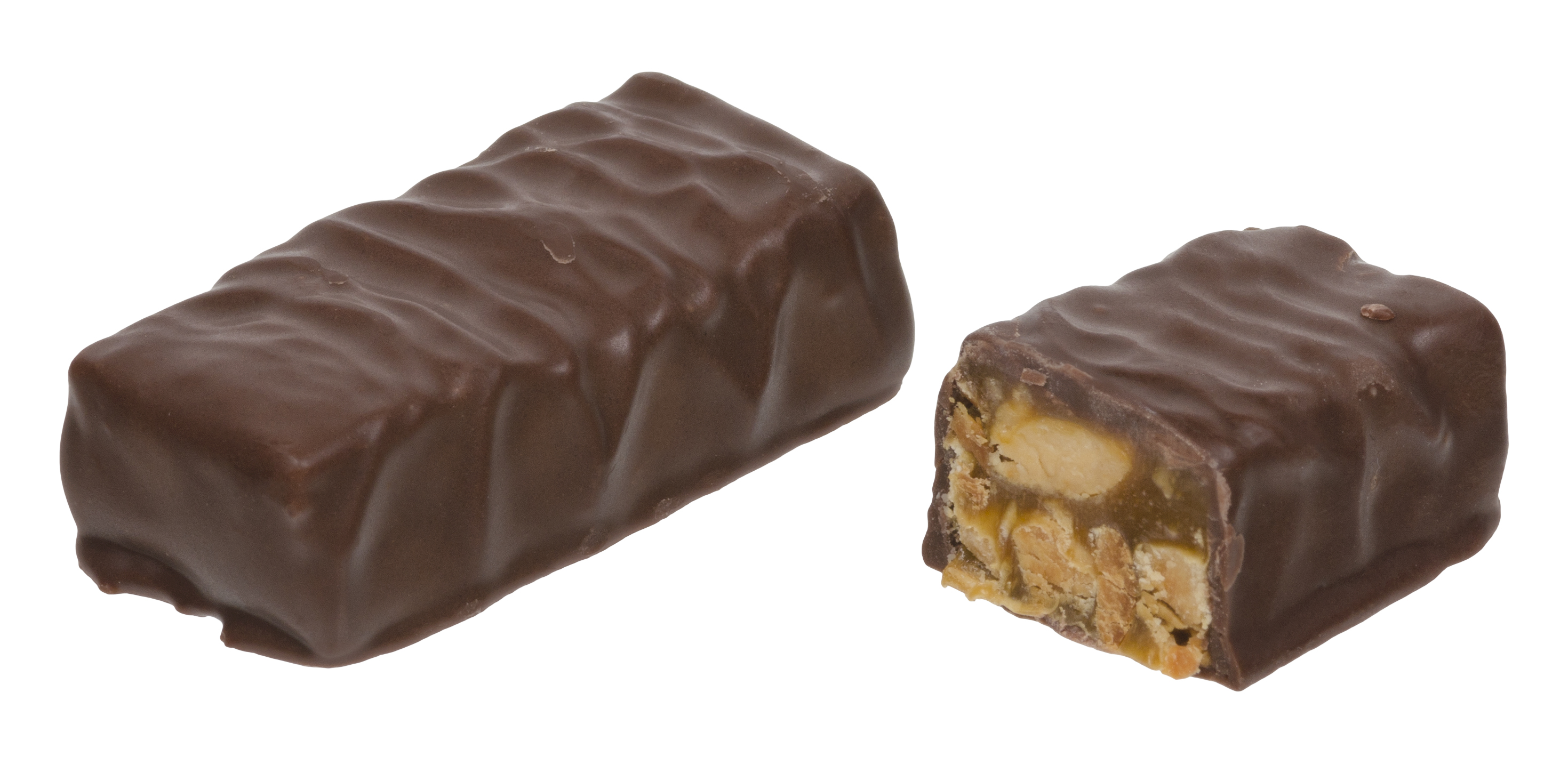
Goldenberg's Peanut Chews

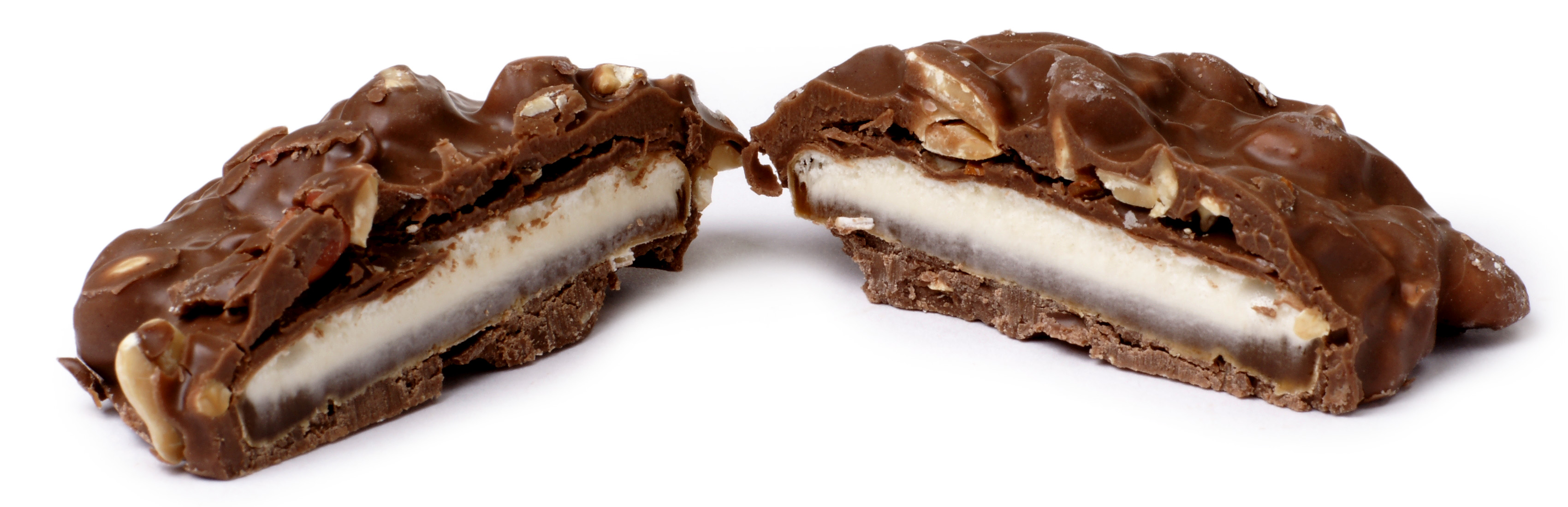
A split Goo Goo Cluster

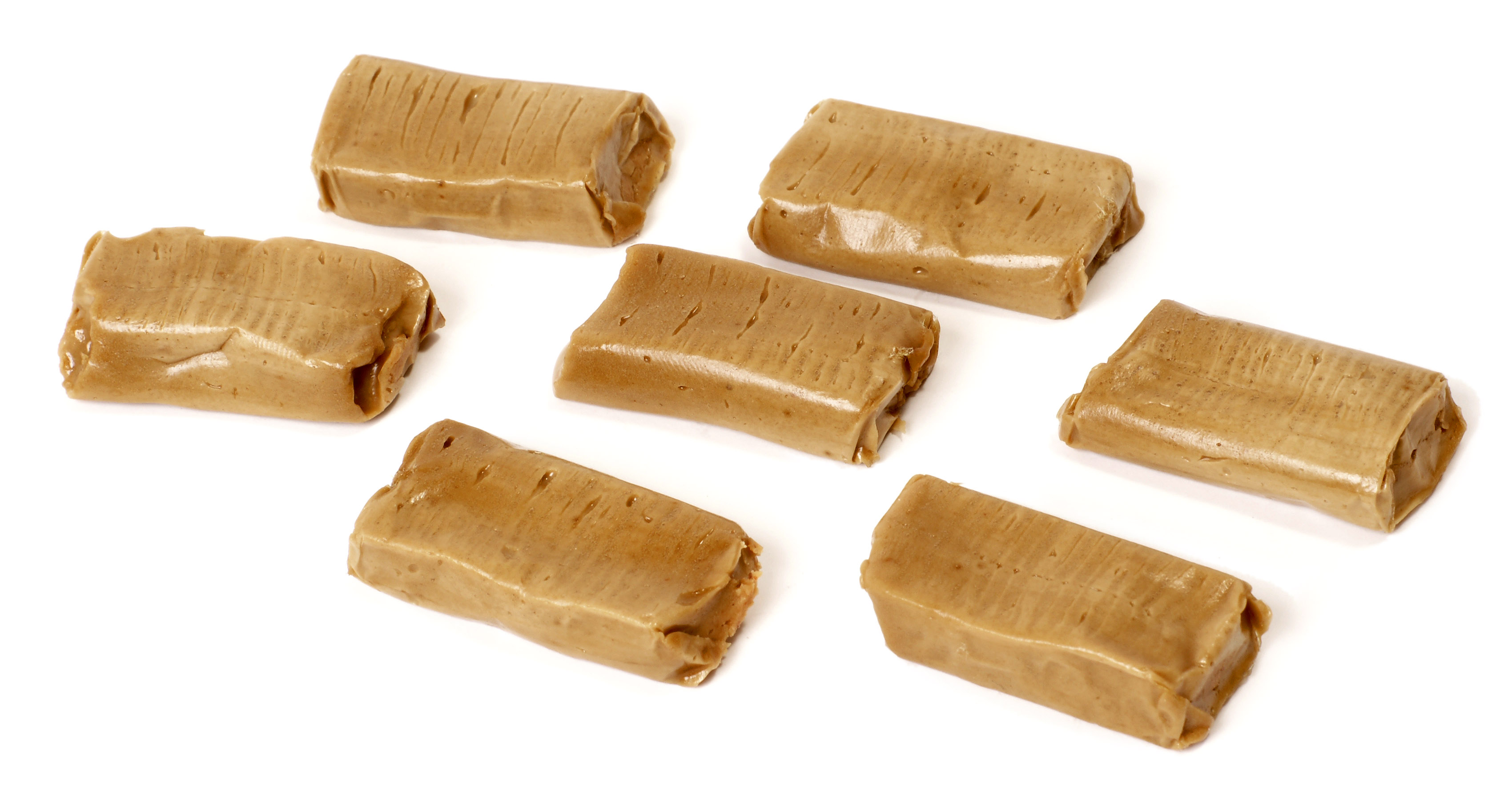
Unwrapped Mary Jane candies

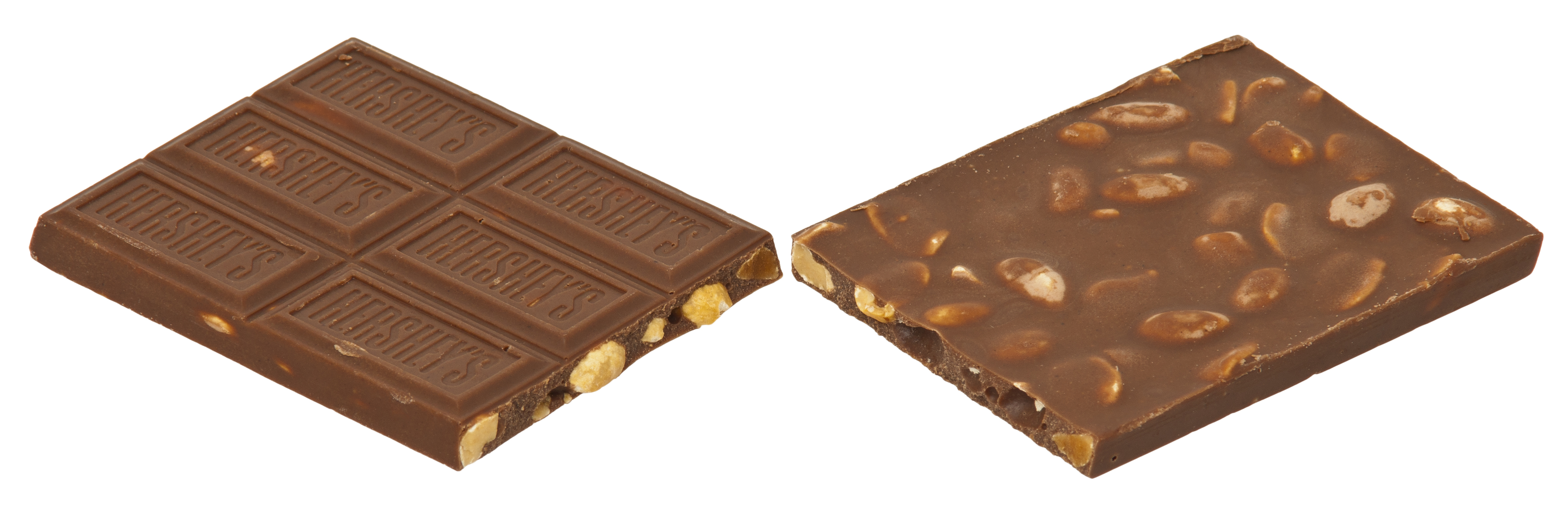
A split Mr. Goodbar

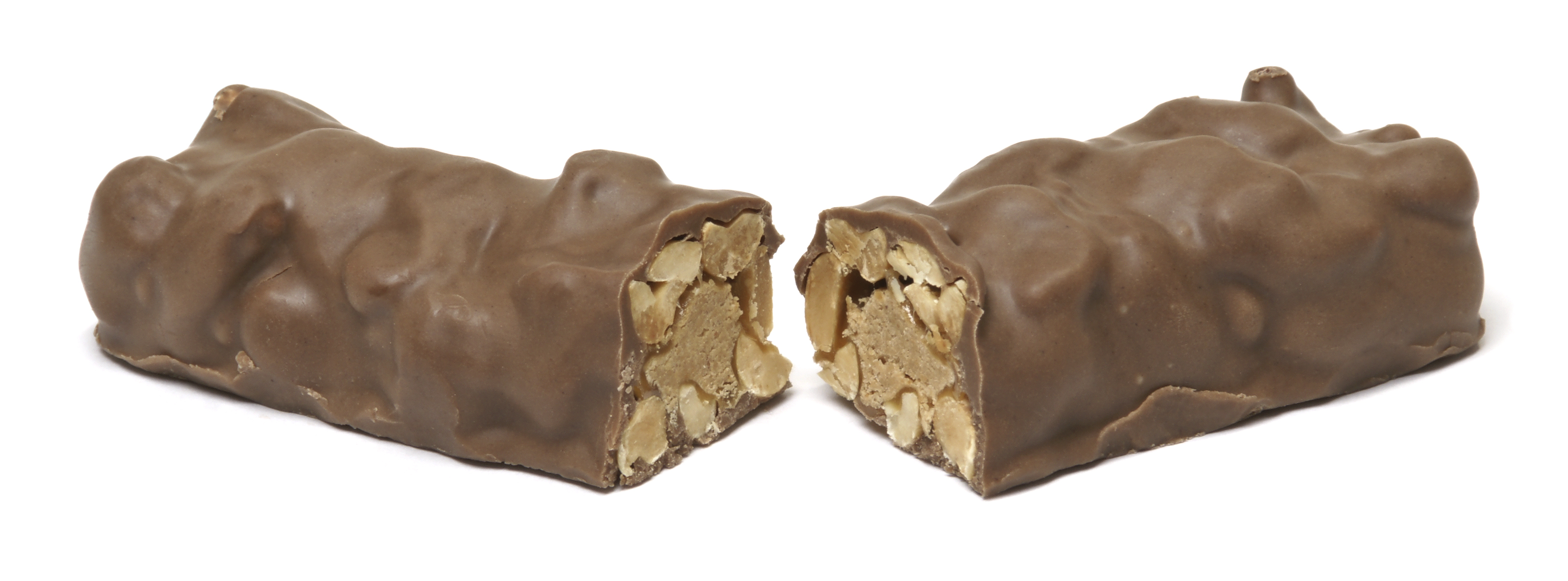
A split NutRageous bar

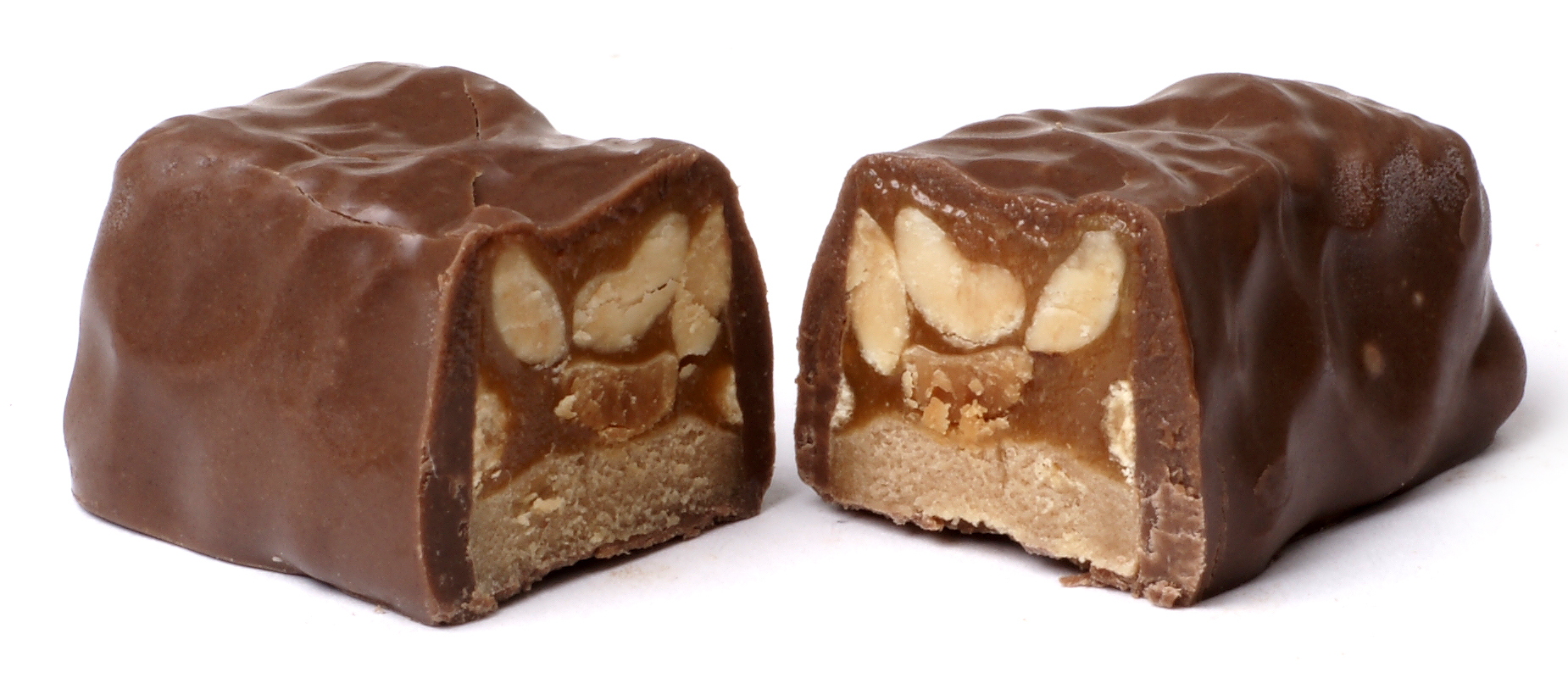
A split Oh Henry! bar

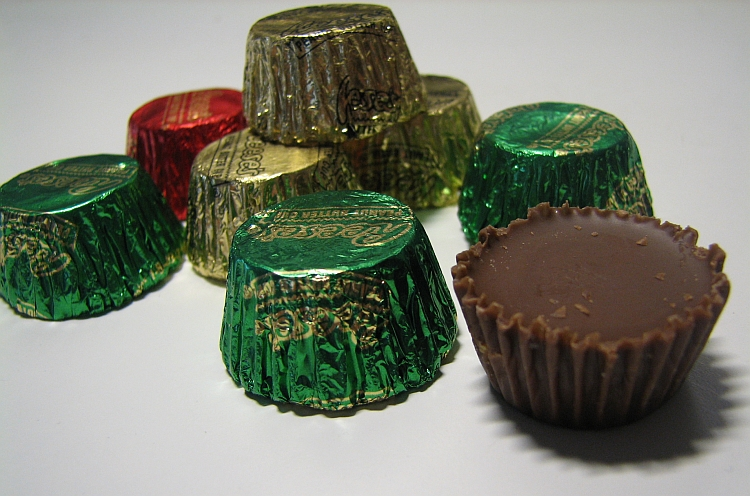
Peanut butter cups

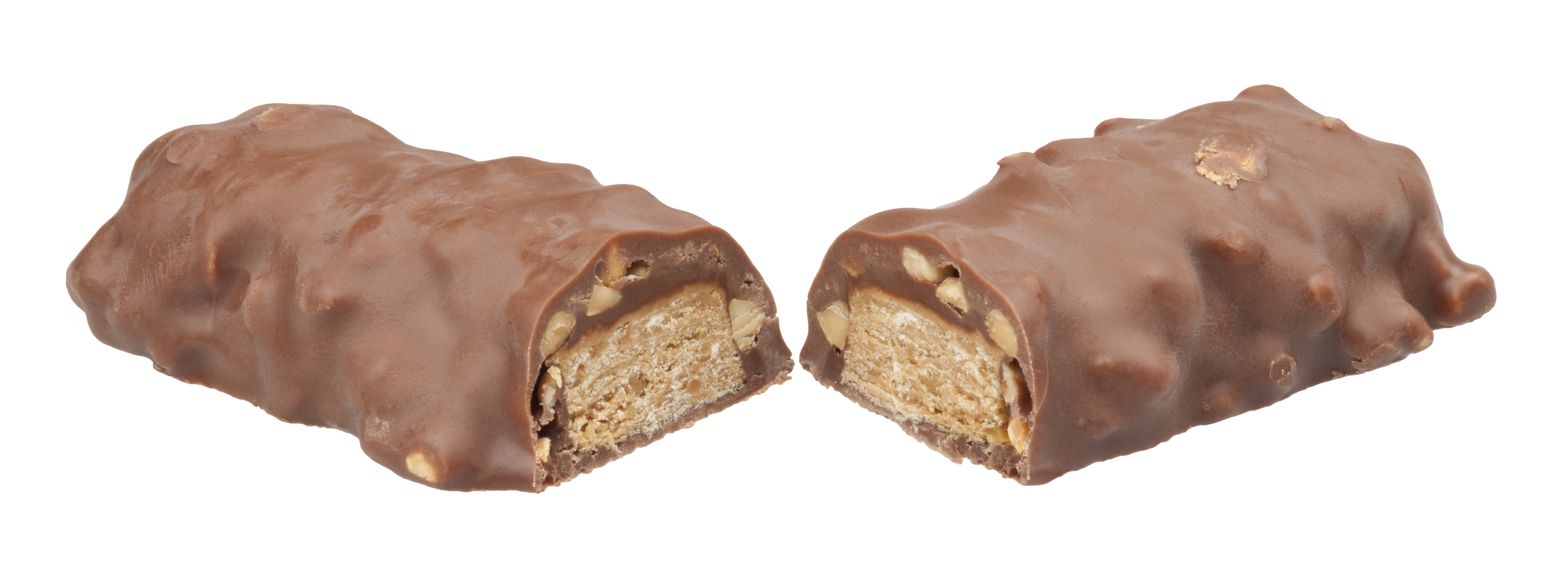
A split Reese's Crispy Crunchy Bar

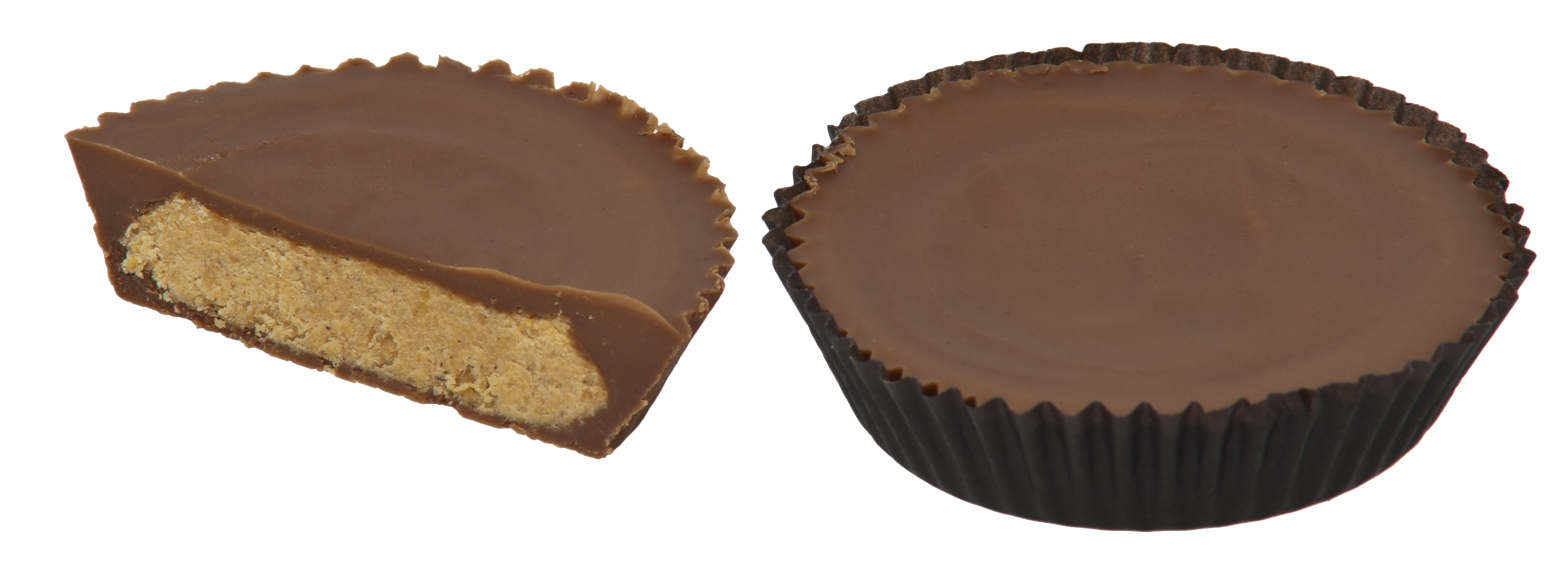
Reese's Peanut Butter Cups

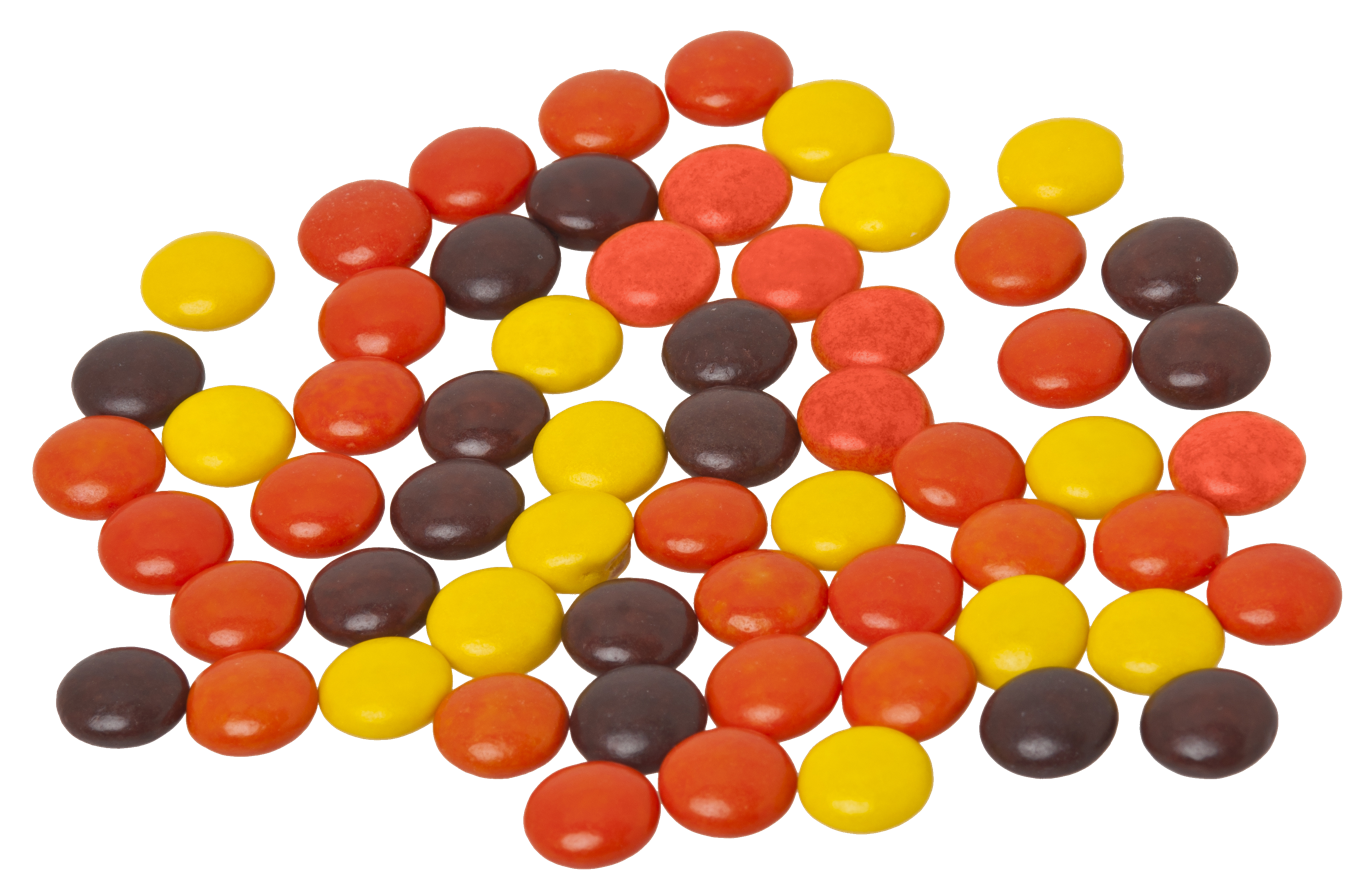
Reese's Pieces

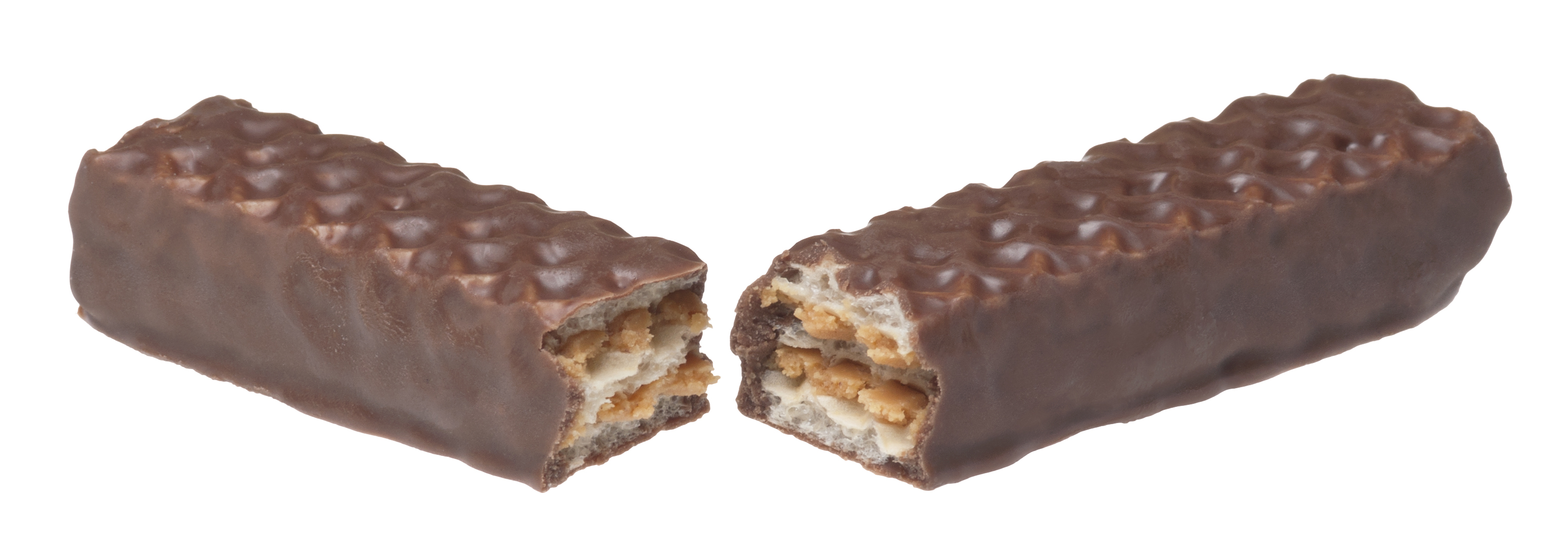
A split Reese's Sticks bar

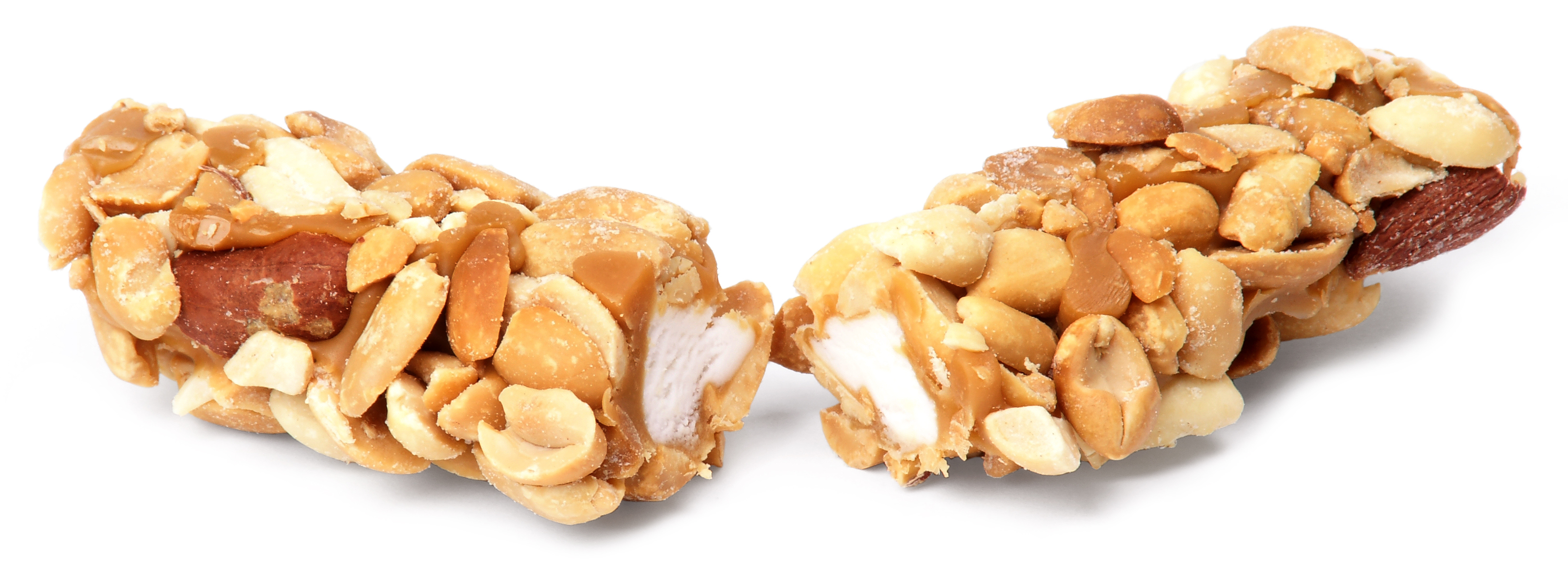
A split Salted Nut Roll

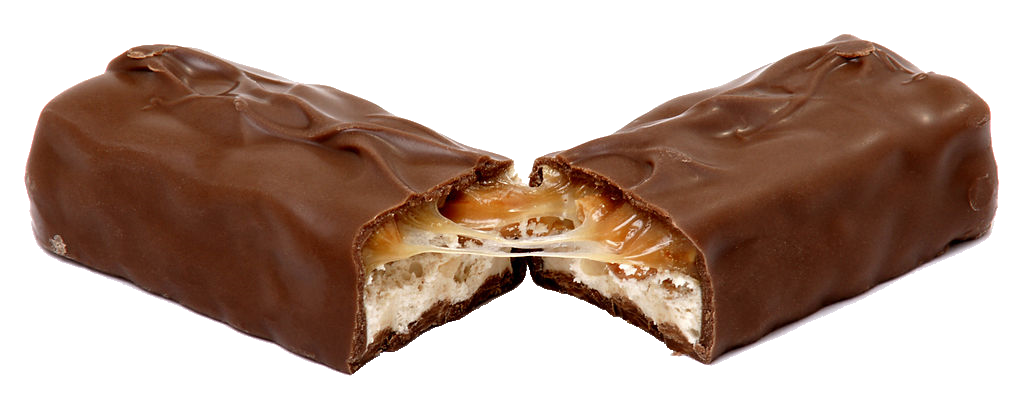
A split Snickers bar

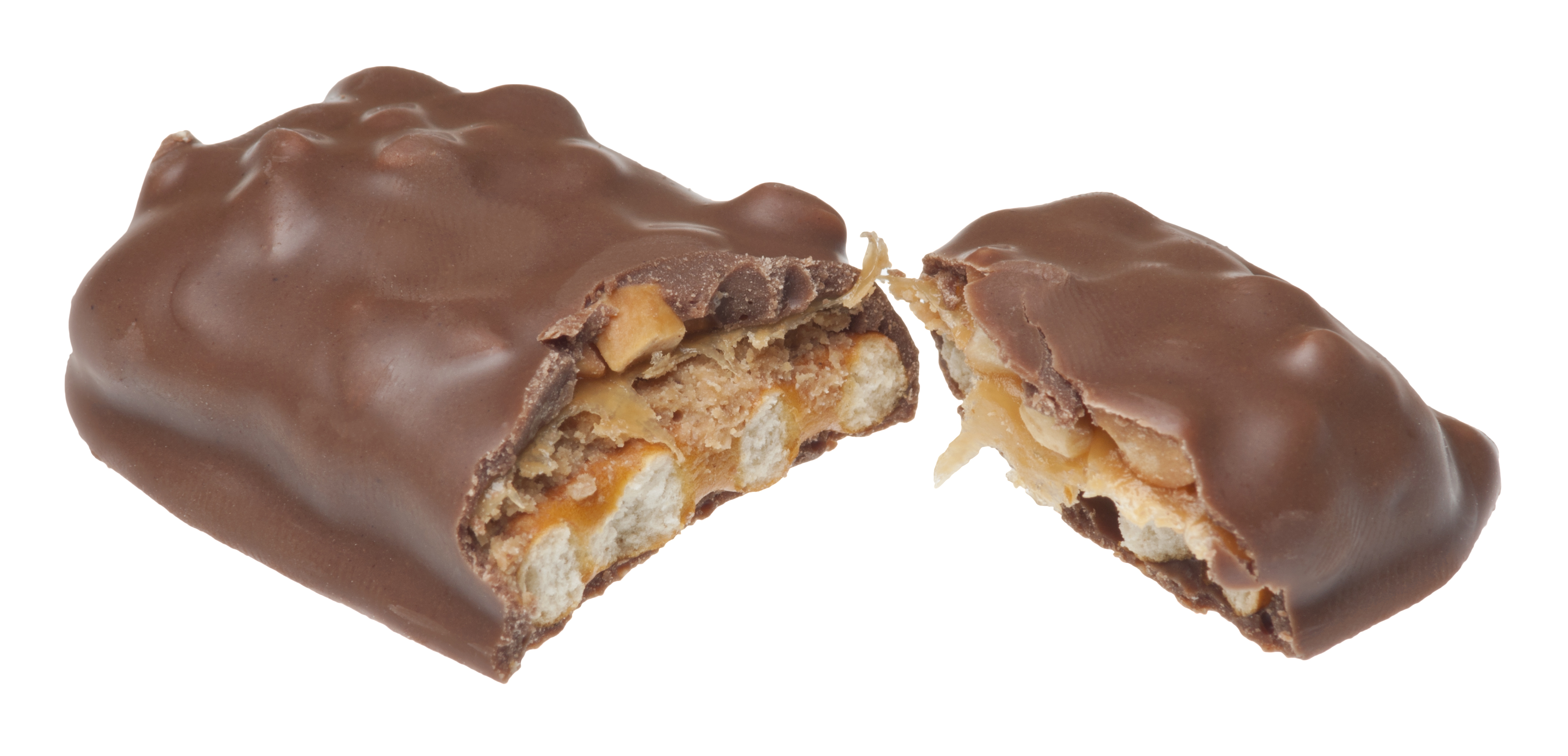
A split Take 5 bar

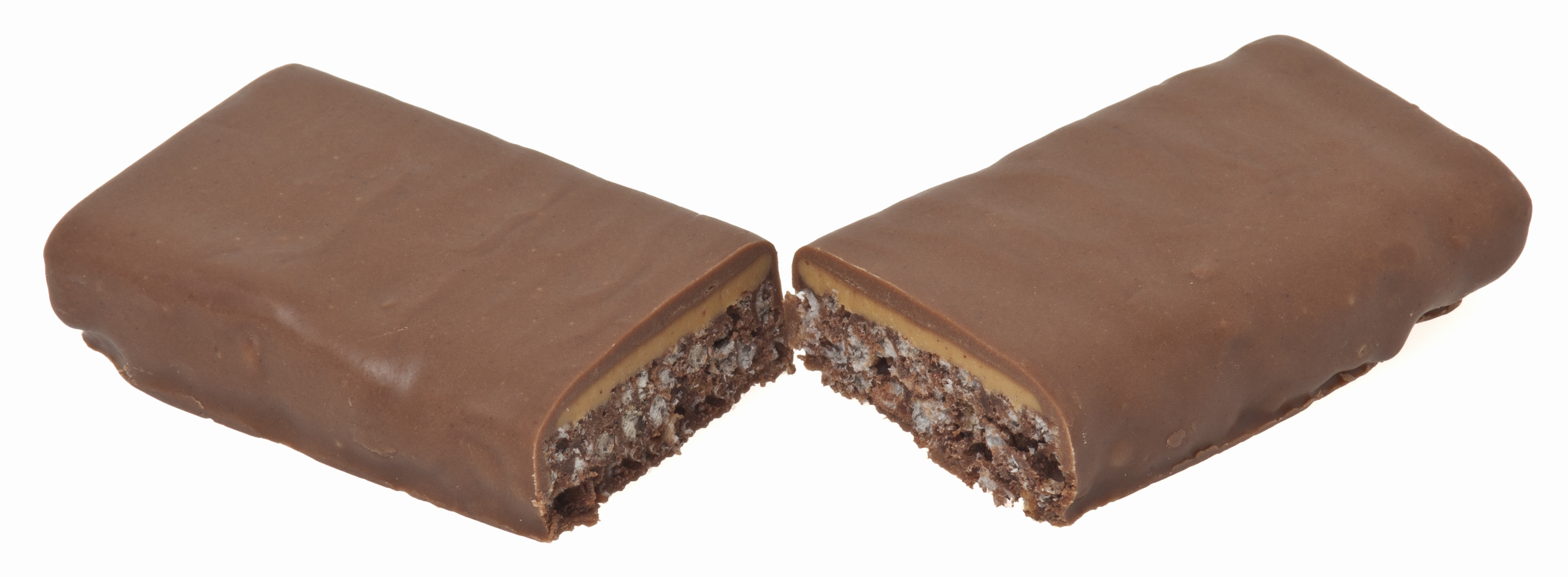
A split Thingamajig bar

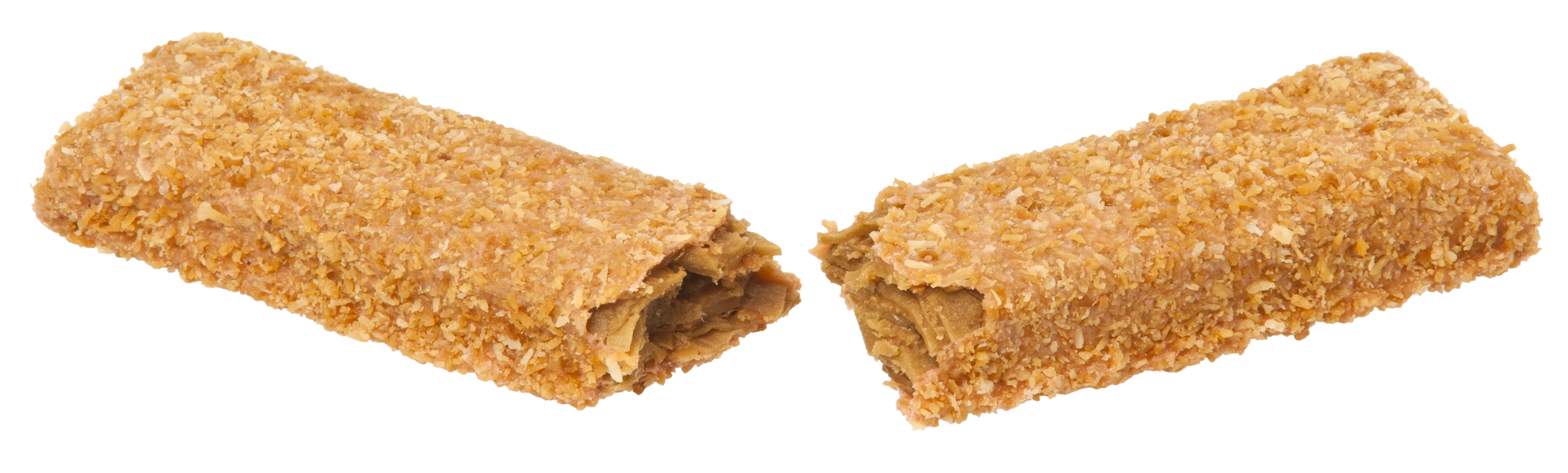
A split Zagnut bar

== Sandwiches ==
- Fluffernutter – a sandwich made with peanut butter and marshmallow fluff, usually served on white bread
- Fool's Gold Loaf – a sandwich made by the Colorado Mine Company, a restaurant in Denver, Colorado. It consists of a single warmed, hollowed-out loaf of bread filled with the contents of one jar of creamy peanut butter and one jar of grape jelly, and a pound of bacon.
- Peanut butter and jelly sandwich – includes one or more layers of peanut butter and one or more layers of either jelly or jam on bread
  - Candwich – a canned sandwich product, as of November 2011 it is only available in a peanut butter and jelly version
- Peanut butter, banana and bacon sandwich – sometimes referred to as an Elvis sandwich, it consists of toasted bread slices with peanut butter, sliced or mashed banana, and sometimes bacon
- Peanut butter and mayonnaise sandwich.
- Peanut butter and honey – consists of peanut butter and honey spread on either toasted or untoasted bread
- Peanut butter and pickle sandwich.
Sandwiches

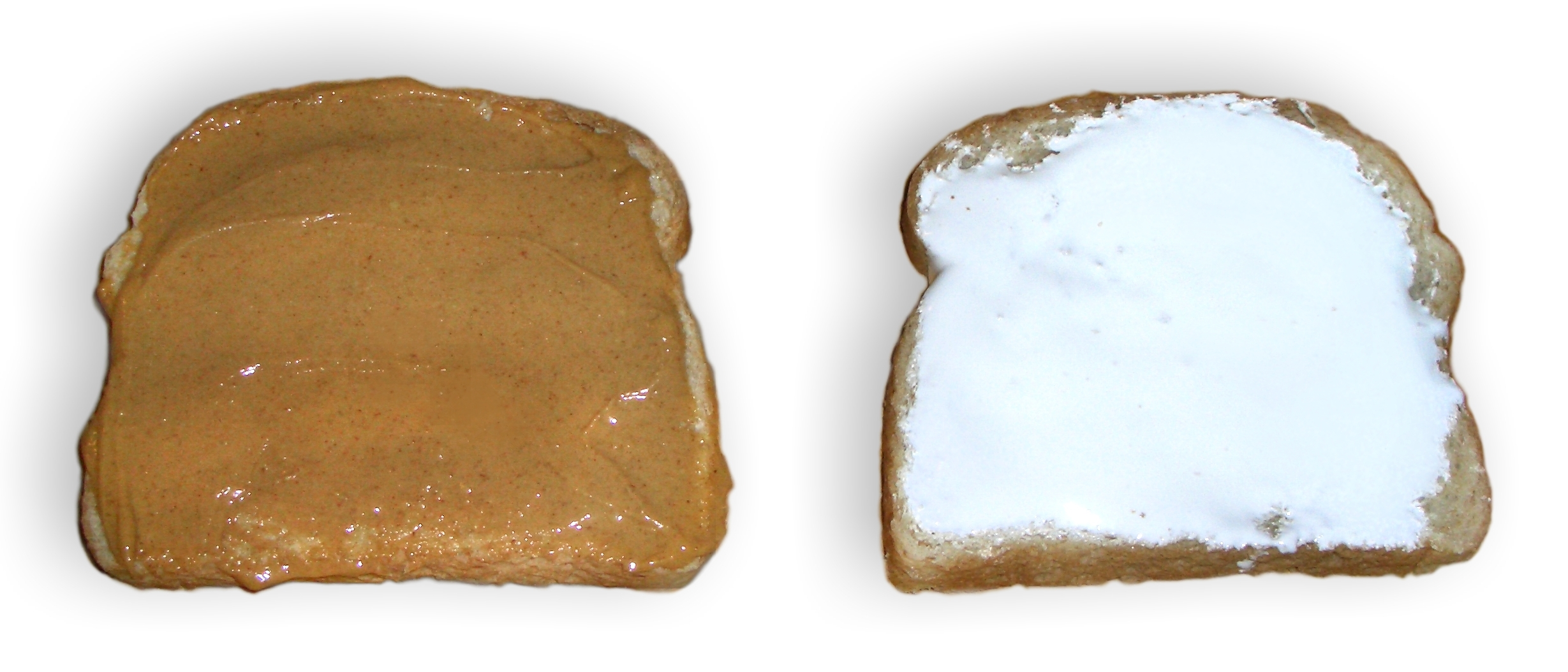
A fluffernutter being prepared

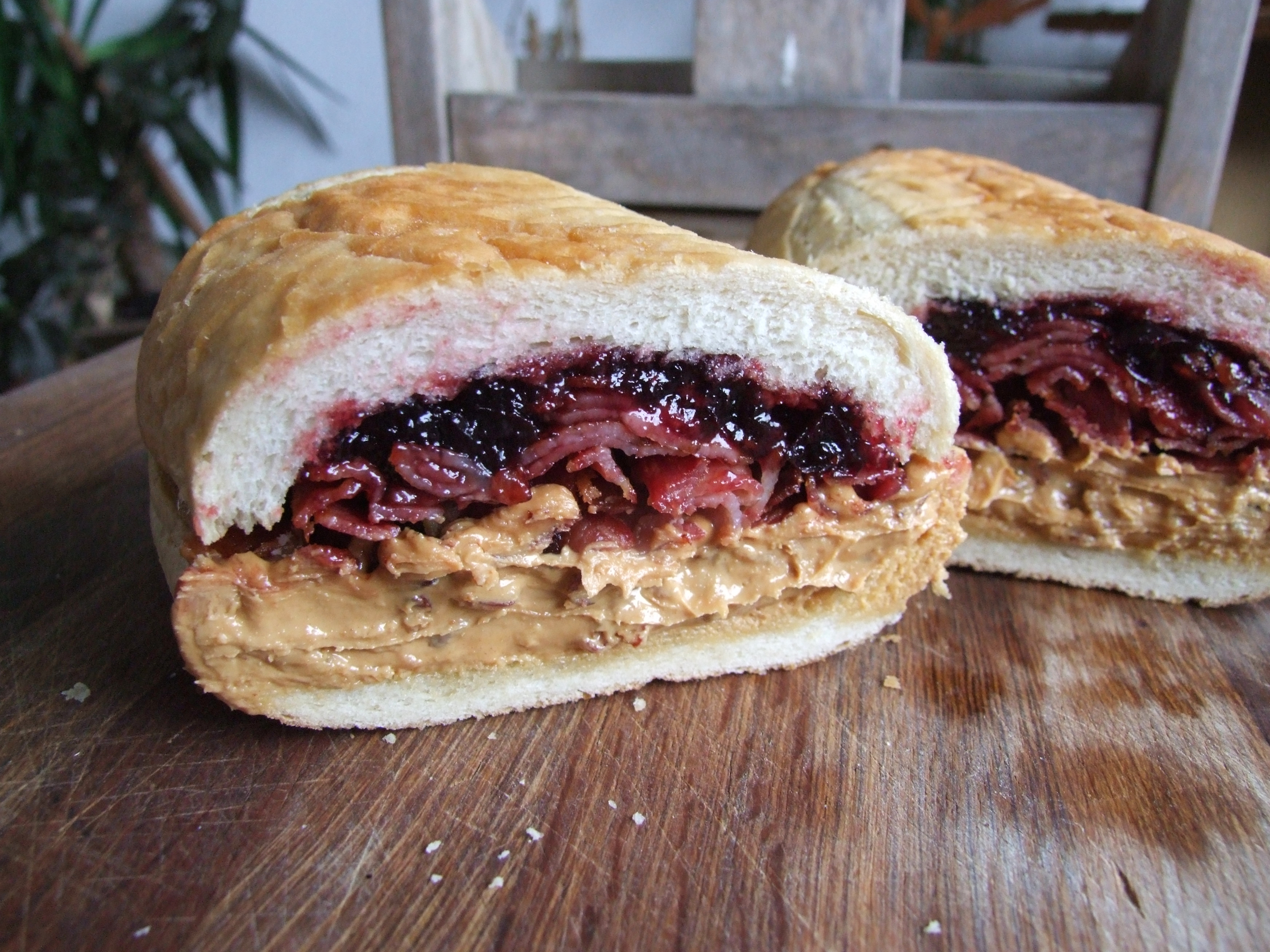
A Fool's Gold Loaf sandwich

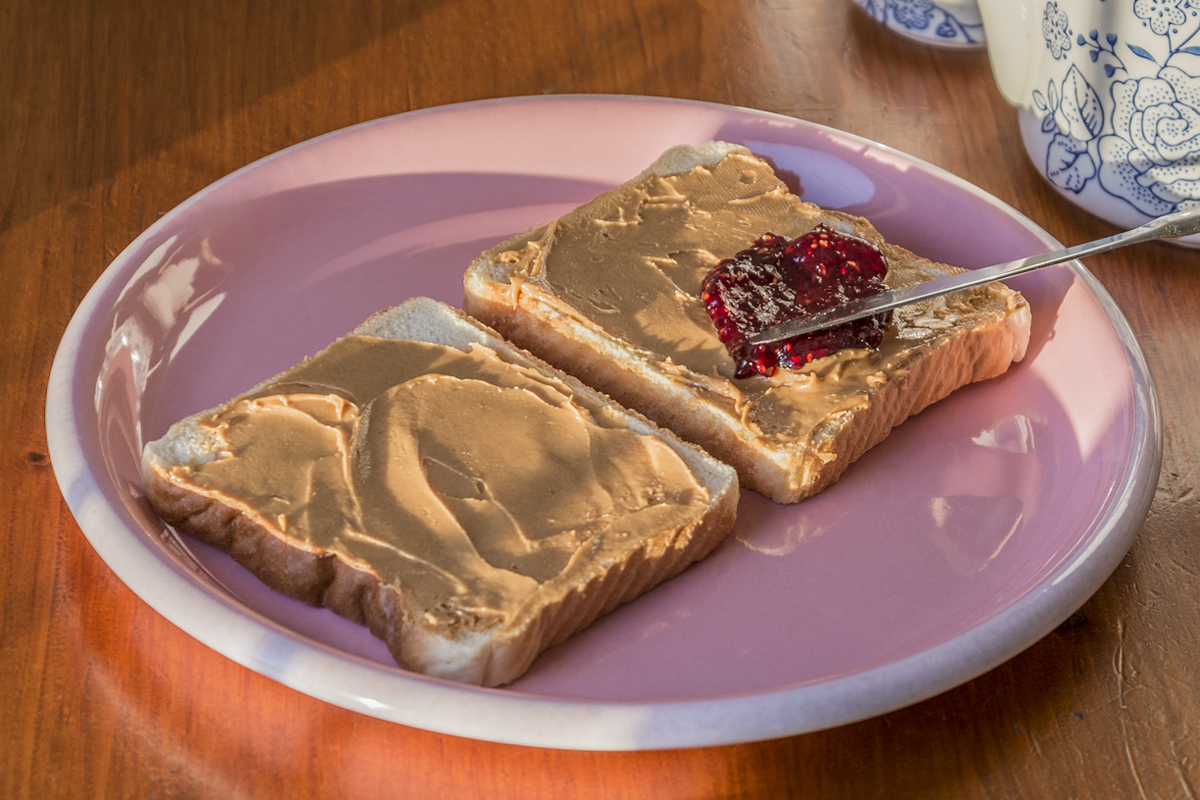
a peanut butter and jelly sandwich being prepared

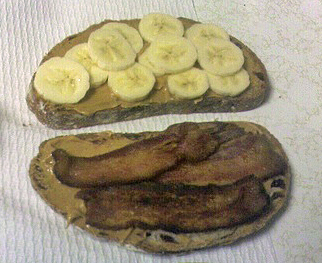
A peanut butter, banana and bacon sandwich

== See also ==
- List of legume dishes
- List of edible seeds
