= Peach Blossom (disambiguation) =

The peach blossom, Thyatira batis, is a moth in the family Drepanidae.

Peach Blossom may also refer to:

- Euthyatira pudens, a moth in the family Drepanidae
- Peach blossom, flowers of the peach tree, Prunus persica
- Peach Blossom Island, an island
- Peach Blossoms, a candy
- Princess Peach's Final Smash in Super Smash Bros.
- Peach Blossom (My Little Pony), a fictional character
- Peach Blossom (film), a 1945 Mexican film
