= Mountain Bar =

American chocolate bar

Mountain Bar is a chocolate bar made by Brown & Haley, Inc. Mountain Bars consist of chocolate and peanuts molded around one of three flavored fillings: vanilla, peanut butter or cherry.

The Mountain Bar was created in 1915 at Brown & Haley Co. in Tacoma, Washington. Originally called Mount Tacoma Bars, the name was changed in 1925 after Brown & Haley began distribution of the candy in Seattle. Shortly after World War II a cherry version of the Mountain Bar was introduced. This was followed by the peanut butter variety in 1974. Cappuccino and Mint flavored Mountain Bars were briefly available in 2010.

As of 2020, all Mountain Bars were produced at the Brown & Haley factory on East 26th Street in Tacoma.

== See also ==
- List of peanut dishes
