= Honey-roasted peanuts =

Flavoured peanut snack

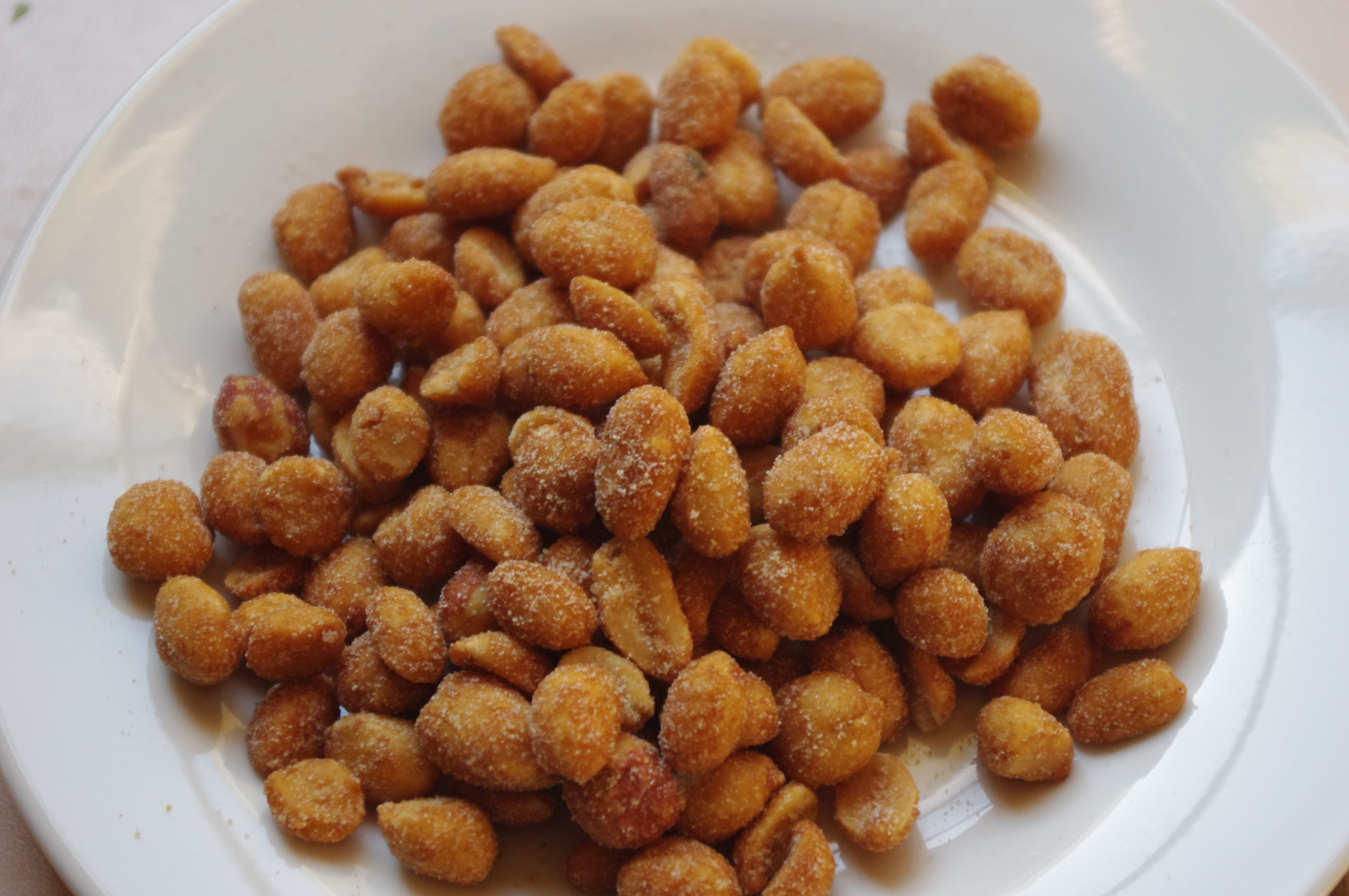

Nutritional value per 28g
- Energy: 160 kcal (670 kJ)
- Carbohydrates
- Sugars: 4g
- Dietary fiber: 1.99g
- Fat
- Saturated: 2g
- Trans: 0g
- Monounsaturated: 7g
- Polyunsaturated: 4g
- Protein: 7g
Vitamins and minerals
Vitamins	Quantity %DV^{†}
Niacin (B3)	31% 5 mg
Minerals	Quantity %DV^{†}
Calcium	2% 30 mg
Copper	44%.4 mg
Iron	9% 1.7 mg
Magnesium	14% 59.9 mg
Manganese	12%.28 mg
Potassium	6% 180 mg
Sodium	4% 85.1 mg
- ^{†}Percentages estimated using US recommendations for adults, except for potassium, which is estimated based on expert recommendation from the National Academies.

Honey-roasted peanuts are a salt-, sugar- and honey-flavored peanut snack food that is provided as a mass-produced product line by several nut and snack food companies, such as Planters, The Sun Valley Nut Co., and King Nut.

== History ==
Before the 1980s, legumes were glazed before being roasted, resulting in a messy, sticky product that "lost both flavor and color", according to the News and Observer. Planters introduced a honey roasted nut mix in 1985.

In 1987, former North Carolina State University food scientist Bill Hoover, working in his home basement lab after he retired, developed a method to glaze the nuts after roasting. Hoover's method roasts the legumes first, then while the nuts are between 160 and 350 degrees, coats them with the glaze. The resulting product is less sticky and retains freshness longer. Hoover sold the patent to Anheuser-Busch but retained royalties.

== Airlines ==
In the United States, some airlines such as Delta Air Lines and Southwest Airlines have provided free snack-sized bags of honey roasted peanuts to its customers on domestic flights. This became a longstanding tradition with Southwest Airlines, but in 2018 the company discontinued providing peanuts in the interest of protecting those who have peanut allergies. King Nut has provided honey roasted peanuts and many other snacks to several airlines based in the United States. (Note: "King Nut, which in 2001 was the snack supplier for United Airlines, American Airlines, Delta Airlines, Continental Airlines, US Airways, Trans World Airlines, America West Airlines, and Southwest Airlines, began packaging not just nuts but nut mixes, pretzels, granola mixes, and breakfast snacks for the airlines.")

== See also ==
- Beer Nuts – an American snack food brand consisting of peanuts with a sweet-and-salty glaze
- List of peanut dishes
- List of snack foods
