= Koba (sweet) =

Malagasy sweet

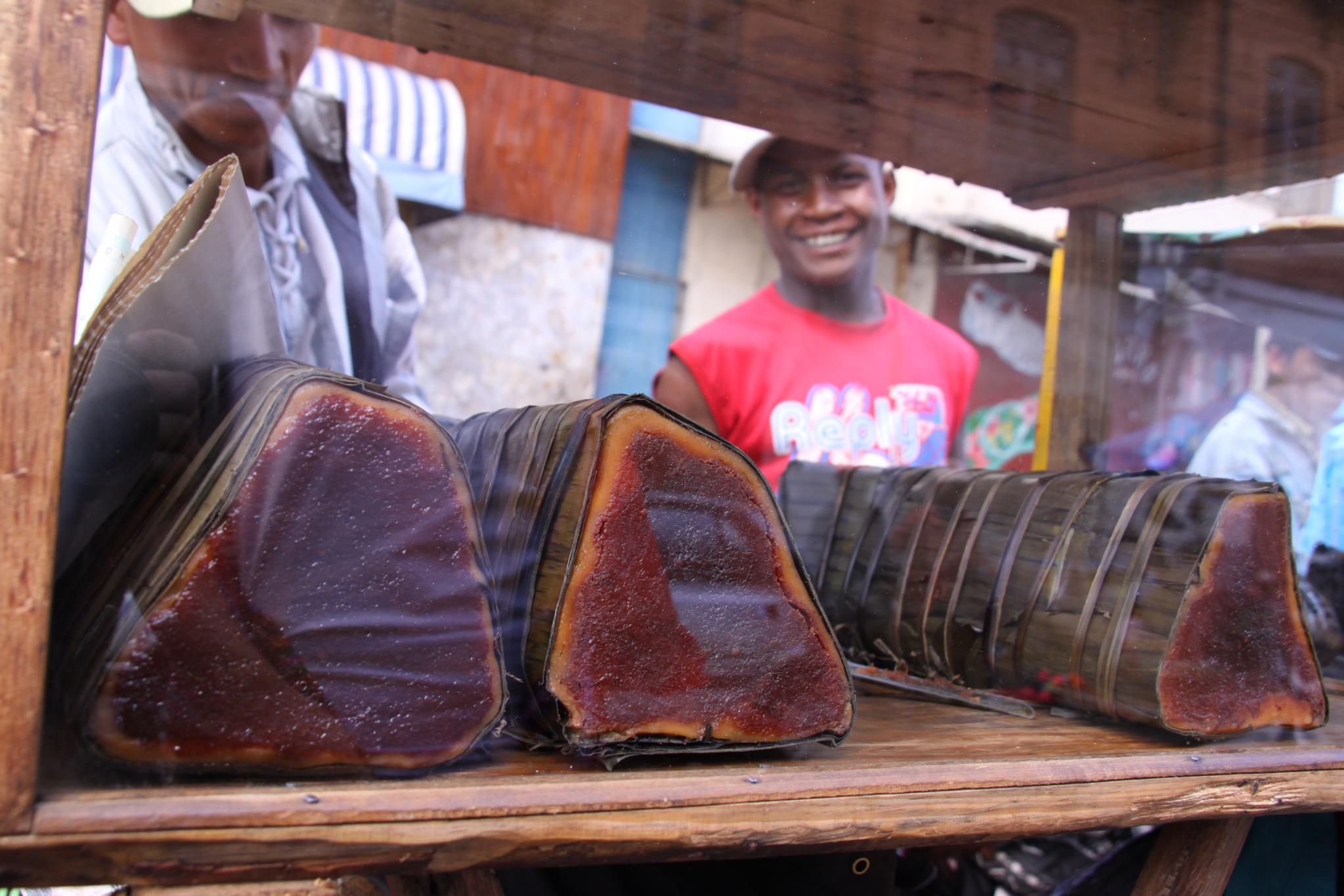
- Thick, dark brown rolls of koba peanut pâté wrapped in banana leaves sold by street vendors in Antananarivo, Madagascar
- Type: Cake
- Place of origin: Madagascar
- Main ingredients: Ground peanuts, brown sugar and rice flour

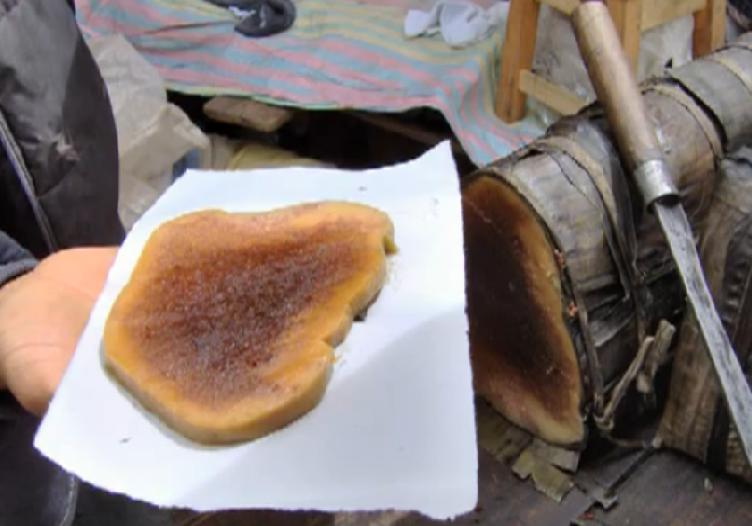
Kobandravina being sliced in Madagascar

Koba is a sweet made from ground peanuts, brown sugar and rice flour. It is a traditional food of Madagascar (where it is also known as koba ravina or kobandravina), especially in the highlands. In marketplaces and gas stations one may find vendors selling koba akondro, a sweet made by wrapping a batter of ground peanuts, mashed bananas, honey and corn flour in banana leaves and steaming or boiling the small cakes until the batter has set.

== Variations ==
Part of the Malagasy cuisine of Madagascar, koba akondro ([kubaˈkundʐʷ]) is sold in marketplaces and gas stations by vendors. It is made by wrapping a batter of ground peanuts, mashed bananas, honey and corn flour in banana leaves and steaming or boiling the small cakes until the batter has set. Peanut brittle is also sold.

== See also ==
- List of peanut dishes
