= Peanut butter bun =

Chinese sweet baked good

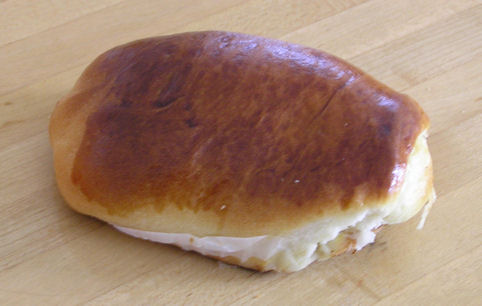
- Type: Sweet bun
- Main ingredients: Peanut butter

Peanut butter bun
- Traditional Chinese: 花生醬包
- Simplified Chinese: 花生酱包
- Hanyu Pinyin: huā shēng jiàng bāo
- Jyutping: faa1 sang1 zoeng3 baau1
- Literal meaning: peanut butter bun
Transcriptions
Standard Mandarin
- Hanyu Pinyin: huā shēng jiàng bāo
Yue: Cantonese
- Jyutping: faa1 sang1 zoeng3 baau1

A peanut butter bun is a sweet bun found in Chinatown bakery shops. The bun has layers of peanut butter filling, sometimes with light sprinkles of sugar mixed with the peanut butter for extra flavor. Unlike other similar buns, the shape varies, depending on the bakery.

The dough is made of flour, sugar, water, yeast, milk, and cream. Before putting it into the oven for baking, the bun is often brushed with sugar water in order to develop a glaze.

== See also ==
- List of buns
- List of peanut dishes
- List of stuffed dishes
