= NutRageous =

Chocolate bar by The Hershey Company

NUTRAGEOUS
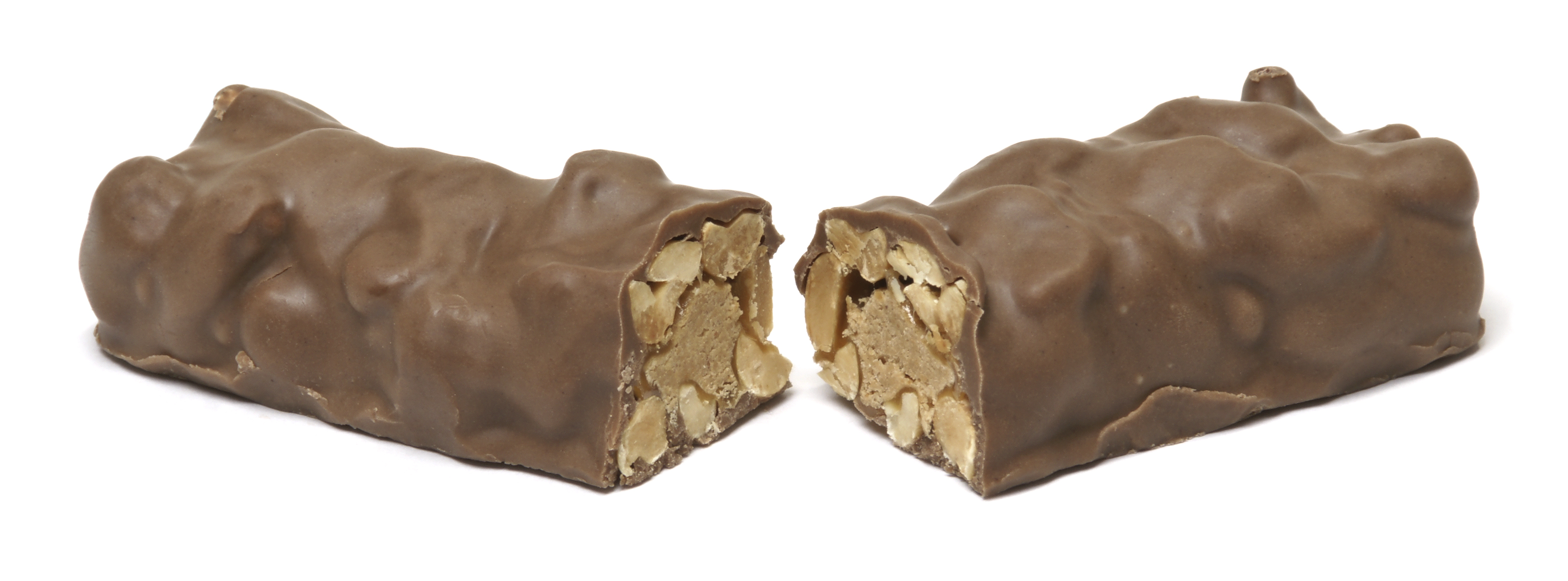
- A candy bar with peanut butter, roasted peanuts and caramel coated in milk chocolate
- Type: Chocolate bar
- Inventor: The Hershey Company
- Inception: 1994; 32 years ago
- Manufacturer: The Hershey Company
- Current supplier: The Hershey Company
- Website: hersheyland.com/nutrageous

NutRageous is a chocolate bar made by The Hershey Company. It consists of Reese's Peanut Butter topped with roasted peanuts and caramel covered in chocolate-flavored coating.

== Overview ==
Developed as a candy bar loosely based on the Reese's Peanut Butter Cup, NutRageous was first sold in 1994. NutRageous was originally called Acclaim, but this name was changed just prior to its release due to focus groups (mainly of children) responding more to the "NutRageous" branding. In 2014, "NutRageous" was rebranded as "Nut Bar" internationally and the weight of the bar was reduced from 51 g to 47 g.

== Product variation ==
In May 2018, Hershey's released "Reese's Outrageous"; a variation of NutRageous which substitutes Reese's Pieces for the roasted peanuts.

== Ingredients ==
NutRageous
Nutritional value per 1 bar (51 g)
- Energy: 280 kcal (1,200 kJ)
- Carbohydrates: 28 g
- Sugars: 22 g
- Dietary fiber: 2 g
- Fat: 16 g
- Saturated: 5 g
- Protein: 6 g
Vitamins and minerals
Minerals	Quantity %DV^{†}
Calcium	2% 20 mg
Iron	1% 0.2 mg
Sodium	4% 100 mg
- Other constituents: Quantity
- Energy from fat: 140 kcal (590 kJ)
- Cholesterol: 0 mg
- ^{†}Percentages estimated using US recommendations for adults.

One Nutrageous bar contains approximately 240 calories. Although Nutrageous candy bars do not contain gluten ingredients, they are not certified as gluten-free.

== See also ==
- List of peanut dishes
