= Deep-fried peanuts =

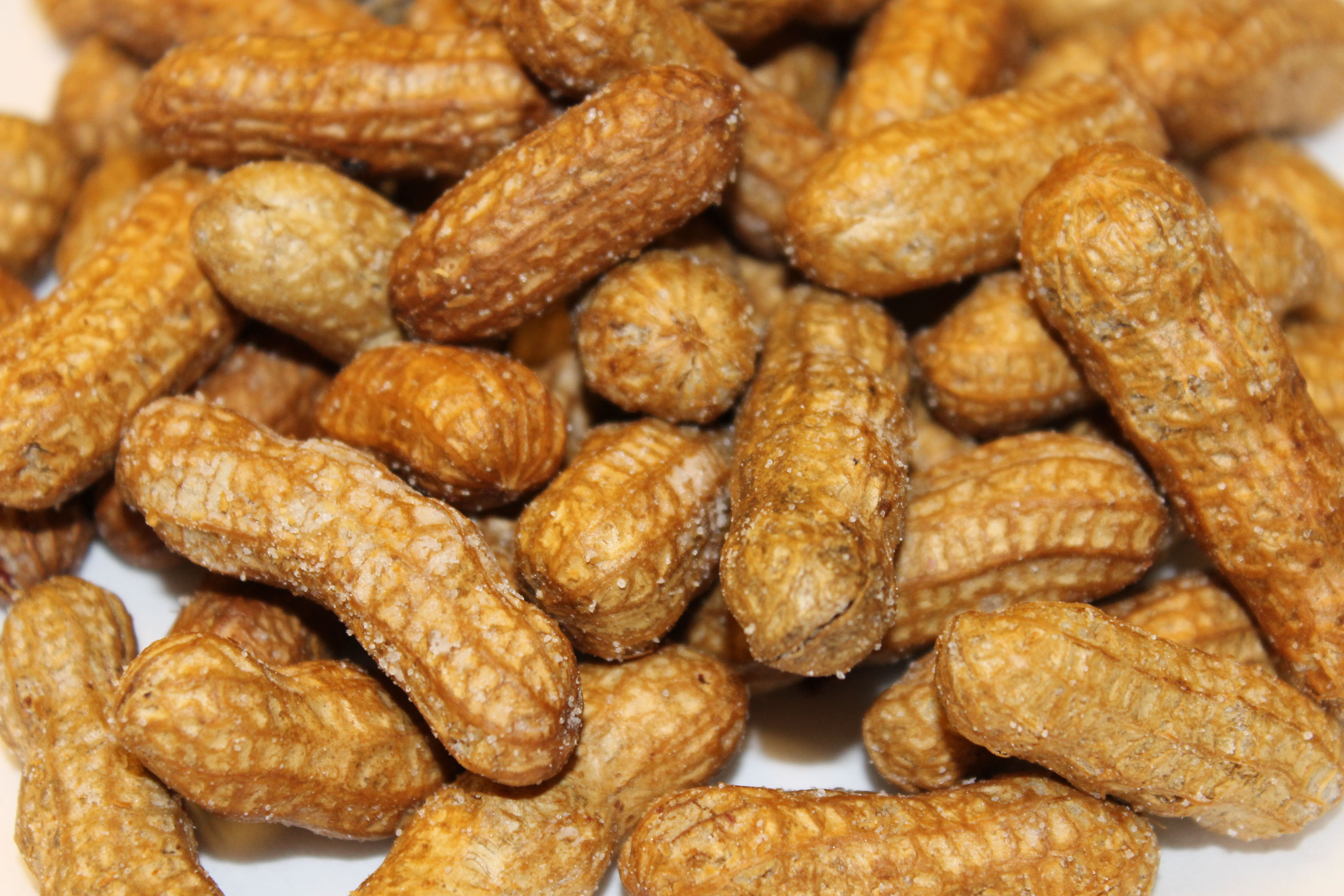
Deep-fried peanuts

Deep-fried peanuts are a snack food created by deep frying peanuts in an oil. The resulting product is a snack food that can be eaten in its entirety, both shell and nut. The deep-frying process does not change the flavor or texture of the nutmeats, but changes the texture and flavor of the shells—especially if seasonings are used—to make them more palatable.

== See also ==
- List of peanut dishes
- List of legume dishes
