= Nkatie cake =

Ghanaian snack

Nkatie Cake
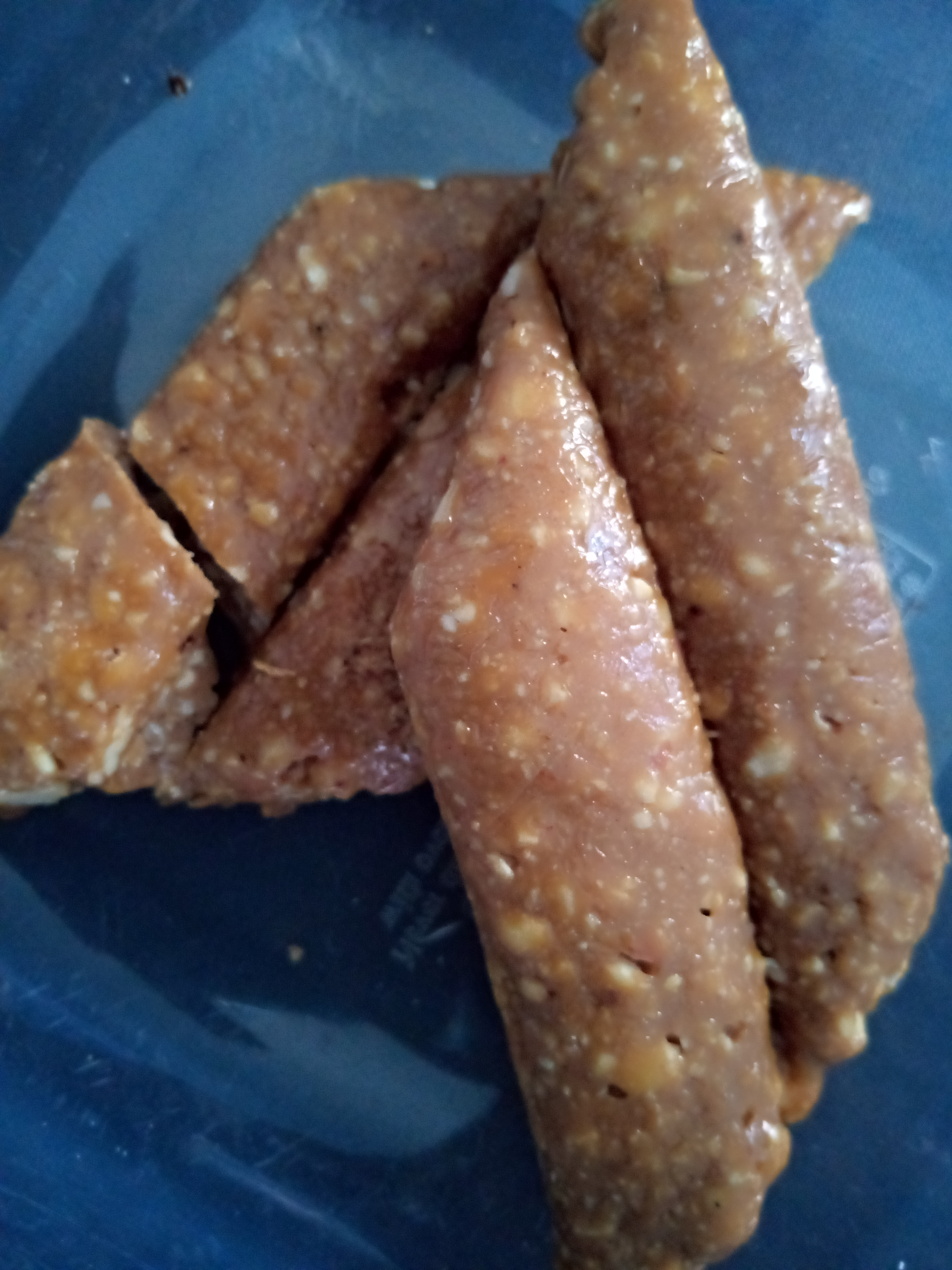
- Course: Snack
- Place of origin: Ghana
- Serving temperature: Hot/Cold
- Main ingredients: Peanuts, Sugar, Water

Nkatie Cake also known as Peanut Cake is a Ghanaian snack. Nkatie cake is usually in a candy bar or shaped in any form made with groundnuts or peanuts and melted sugar. This snack is also common in Guinea, they refer to it as Kongodo and in Senegal it is known as louga. The snack is eaten by both the young and old, but very common among school children.

== Ingredients ==
- 1/2 cup sugar
- 1/2 cup roasted groundnut
- 1 tsp vegetable oil
