= Peach Blossoms =

American candy

- A cutaway of a Peach Blossoms candy showing the peanut butter inside the hard candy shell.
- Type: Candy
- Place of origin: United States
- Created by: New England Confectionery Co.
- Main ingredients: Peanut butter

Peach Blossoms were a candy made by Necco at The New England Confectionery Co. in Revere, Massachusetts. They contained peanut butter wrapped in a crunchy shell. Contrary to their name and color, the flavor did not imitate that of a peach. They were made with sugar, corn syrup, ground peanuts, salt, glycerine, vanillin and artificial coloring.

The candy was one of the company's brands placed on auction in 2018, but no potential buyer came forward.

== See also ==
- List of peanut dishes
