= List of chocolate bar brands =

This is a list of chocolate bar brands, in alphabetical order, including discontinued brands. A chocolate bar, also known as a candy bar in American English, is a confection in an oblong or rectangular form containing chocolate, dark chocolate, or white chocolate, which may also contain layerings or mixtures that include nuts, fruit, caramel, nougat, and wafers.

Key:

Flavor variant of chocolate bar brand

== Numbers ==
Name	Image	Distribution	Manufacturer	Description	Ref.
3 Musketeers		Canada, United States	Mars	Aerated chocolate-flavored nougat with milk chocolate coating; also available in mint and caramel	
3 Musketeers Truffle Crisp		United States, Canada	Mars	Chocolate truffle on top of meringue in milk chocolate.	
5 Star		India, Indonesia, Malaysia, Brazil, South Africa, the Philippines, Egypt	Cadbury	Caramel and nougat covered in milk chocolate	
5th Avenue		United States	Hershey	Honeycombed crunchy peanut butter in milk chocolate	
100 Grand Bar		United States, Canada	Ferrara (previously Nestlé)	Caramel and crisped rice in milk chocolate	

== A ==
Name	Image	Distribution	Manufacturer	Description	Ref.
Aero		Europe, Canada, Australia, New Zealand, Argentina, South Africa, Japan, the Middle East, New Zealand	Nestlé	Frothy aerated chocolate with "bubbles"	
After Eight		Europe, Canada, United States (only online)	Nestlé	Dark chocolate bar with mint	
Almond Joy		United States, Canada	Hershey (previously Peter Paul & Cadbury)	Milk chocolate covered coconut with whole almonds. Limited editions include chocolate (featuring chocolate-coconut filling) and piña colada (featuring pineapple-flavored coconut in chocolate)	
Almond Roca		United States	Brown and Haley	Chocolate-covered hard toffee with a coating of ground almonds	
Amul Chocolate		India	Anand Milk Union Limited, India	Available in orange, milk and chocolate flavors	
Andes Snap Bar		United States	Tootsie	Dark chocolate with mint flavor.	
Animal Bar		United Kingdom, Ireland	Nestlé	Milk chocolate bar	
Aztec		United Kingdom	Cadbury	Nougat and caramel covered with milk chocolate	

== B ==
Name	Image	Distribution	Manufacturer	Description	Ref.
Baby Ruth		United States, Canada	Ferrara (previously Curtiss Candy Company, RJR Nabisco and Nestlé)	Caramel and nougat center with peanuts in compound chocolate	
Baileys		United Kingdom, Ireland	Diageo	Various filling with Baileys enrobed in milk chocolate	
Balisto		The Netherlands, Belgium, France, Germany	Masterfoods	Muesli covered in chocolate	
Banjo (named after the stringed instrument with the same name)		United Kingdom (1950s, 1976–1980s)	Mars	The original was wafers enrobed in milk chocolate. The rebirth of Banjo was a layer of wafers and a layer of peanuts enrobed in milk chocolate.	
Bar None		United States	Hershey	Cocoa wafer, chocolate filling, peanuts enrobed in a milk chocolate coating	
Bar One		India, South Africa	Nestlé	Malted nougat with a caramel topping and covered in milk chocolate	
Big Turk		Canada	Nestlé	Turkish delight covered with milk chocolate	
Bertie Beetle		Australia	Nestlé	Honeycomb enrobed in milk chocolate	
Beryl's		Malaysia, Indonesia, Singapore	Beryl's		
Better Way Bar		United Kingdom	Hotel Chocolat	50% milk or 70% dark chocolate paired with hazelnut chocolate praline, crispy biscuit and tart cherry pieces.	
Black Thunder		Japan	Yuraku Confectionery Company	Cocoa-flavored cookie bar mixed with Japanese-style rice puffs enrobed in milk chocolate. Comes in numerous variants with dark chocolate, chocolate chips, coconut, granola, fruit, and other ingredients.	
Boci		Hungary	Nestlé		
Boost		United Kingdom, Ireland, Australia, New Zealand and South Africa	Cadbury	Milk chocolate with a caramel and biscuit filling	
Bounty		Worldwide (except United States)	Mars	Coconut filling covered with milk or plain chocolate. Also comes in dark chocolate. Came in various fruit flavours in various markets.	
Bournville		United Kingdom, Ireland, Middle East, South Africa, India, Pakistan	Cadbury	Dark chocolate	
Bubbly		Sweden	Marabou	Milk chocolate with small air pockets	
Branche		Switzerland	Nestlé	A praline-filled chocolate and hazelnut bar that resembles the branch of a tree. Made since 1904	
Breakaway		United Kingdom	Nestlé	A rectangular digestive biscuit covered in milk chocolate	
Bros		The Netherlands	Nestlé	Aerated milk chocolate	
Bubu Lubu		Mexico, United States	Ricolino (Mexico)	Strawberry gummy candy and marshmallow with chocolate-flavored coating	
Bun Bar		United States	Pearson's Candy Company	Maple-flavored crème, vanilla-flavored crème, or caramel, topped with roasted peanuts and coated in milk chocolate	
Butlers Chocolates		Worldwide	Butlers	Luxury Chocolates	
Butterfinger		United States, Canada	Ferrara (previously Curtiss Candy Company, RJR Nabisco and Nestlé)	Honeycombed crunchy peanut butter candy center in milk chocolate	

== C ==
Name	Image	Distribution	Manufacturer	Description	Ref.
Cabana		United Kingdom	Rowntree's	Caramel, coconut, and cherry pieces enrobed in milk chocolate	
Cadbury Dairy Milk		Worldwide	Cadbury (Worldwide); Hershey (United States)	Milk chocolate	
Cadbury Dairy Milk Bubbly		United Kingdom, India, Australia, New Zealand, South Africa, Malaysia, China, the Philippines	Cadbury	Aerated milk chocolate	
Cadbury Dairy Milk Silk		India	Cadbury	Premium milk chocolate	
Cadbury Dark Milk		India	Cadbury	Dark chocolate	
Cadbury Plant Bar		United Kingdom & Ireland	Cadbury	Plant-based milk chocolate	
Cadbury Royal Dark		United States	Hershey	Dark chocolate	
Cadbury Tempo		South Africa	Cadbury	Shortcake biscuit and caramel covered in Cadbury's dairy milk chocolate	
Cadbury Temptations		India	Cadbury	Milk chocolate, available with Rum, Raisins and Almonds.	
Cailler		Worldwide	Nestlé	oldest swiss Milk chocolate.	
Caramel Wafer		United Kingdom	Tunnock's	Caramel and wafers, covered in milk chocolate; officially called the Tunnock's Milk Chocolate Coated Caramel Wafer Biscuit	
Caramello		New Zealand, Australia, United States, Ireland, United Kingdom	Cadbury (Worldwide); Hershey (United States)	Segmented, break apart bar with caramel center, covered in milk chocolate	
Caramello Koala		Australia, South Africa	Cadbury	Koala shaped chocolate with caramel filling	
Caramilk		Canada, Europe, South Africa, Australia	Cadbury	Caramel-filled chocolate bar	
Carlos V		Mexico, Latin America	Nestlé	Milk chocolate	
Charleston Chew		Canada, United States	Tootsie Roll Industries	Chocolate, vanilla and strawberry flavored variants	
Cherry Ripe		New Zealand, Australia	Cadbury	Cherry and coconut bits in chocolate	
Chicken Dinner		United States (1923–1962)	Sperry Candy Company	Peanuts in milk chocolate	
Choc Nut		Philippines	Annie's Sweets Manufacturing and Packaging Corporation	Chocolate and peanut candy	
Chocolatey PayDay		United States	The Hershey Company	Peanuts and caramel enrobed in chocolate	
Chokito		New Zealand, Australia, Brazil, Switzerland	Nestlé	Chocolate-covered caramel fudge with crisped rice	
Chomp		United Kingdom, South Africa, Australia, Zimbabwe, Ireland	Cadbury	Caramel and wafer in chocolate	
Chunky		United States	Ferrara (previously Nestlé)	Milk chocolate with peanuts and raisins	
Clark Bar		United States	Boyer	Honeycombed peanut butter filling coated with chocolate	
Cloud 9		Philippines	Jack n' Jill	Nougat topped with caramel and peanuts in milk chocolate.	
Club		United Kingdom, Ireland	United Biscuits / Valeo Foods	Biscuits with various flavours enrobed in chocolate	
Coffee Crisp		Canada	Nestlé	Milk chocolate with wafer crisps and coffee flavouring	
Côte d'Or		Worldwide	Côte d'Or; Kraft Foods	Belgian Chocolate	
Cow Chocolate		Israel	Strauss-Elite	Milk chocolate, available not just in bars but also in other candy forms; called Cow Chocolate because of the cow on the packaging; called "Shokolad Parah" in Hebrew	
Crachi		the Dominican Republic	Cortes	Made with locally produced chocolate from the Dominican Republic and crisped rice	
Creme Egg Bar		United Kingdom, Ireland, India, Australia, New Zealand, Canada, United States	Cadbury (Worldwide); Hershey (United States)	Milk chocolate with signature Cadbury Creme Egg fondant.	
Co-Co		Sweden	Marabou	Coconut toffee covered in milk chocolate	
Creme Egg Twisted		United Kingdom, Australia	Cadbury	Cadbury Creme Egg fondant in a hollow milk chocolate log	
Crisp		United States	Nestlé	Wafer chocolate bars based on Butterfinger, Baby Ruth, and Crunch	
Crispello		India	Cadbury	Crispy wafer covered in milk chocolate	
Crispy Crunch		Canada	Cadbury	Peanut butter and toffee mixture coated in milk chocolate	
Crunch		Worldwide	Ferrara (United States), Nestlé (Worldwide, formerly United States)	Milk chocolate with crisped rice	
Crunchie		New Zealand, United Kingdom, India, Ireland, Canada, Australia, South Africa	Cadbury	Honeycomb (sponge) toffee covered with chocolate	
Crunky		South Korea, Japan	Lotte	Rice crisps covered in chocolate	
Culinaria		Worldwide		Premium Belgian chocolates	
Curly Wurly		United Kingdom, Ireland, New Zealand, Australia, the Netherlands	Cadbury	Chocolate-covered caramel braid	

== D ==
Name	Image	Distribution	Manufacturer	Description	Ref.
Da-Capo		Finland	Fazer	Rhum Martinique mixed in prailines enrobed in dark chocolate.	
Daim		Worldwide	Kraft Foods	Chocolate over crisp almond toffee	
Darkmilk		United Kingdom, Australia, Canada	Cadbury	Dark Chocolate	
Double Decker		United Kingdom, Ireland	Cadbury	Soft nougat top, with a crisped cereal base, covered in milk chocolate	
Dove Bar		United States, Canada, Australia, Europe (except United Kingdom, Ireland), Mexico	Mars	Creamy milk and dark chocolate, with added varieties such as fruit and nut; the Mars equivalent to Cadbury's Dairy Milk; called Galaxy in the United Kingdom	
Dream		Australia, New Zealand, United Kingdom, United States, South Africa	Cadbury (Worldwide); Hershey (United States)	White chocolate	
Drifter		United Kingdom, Ireland	Nestlé	Wafers and caramel in milk chocolate	
Duncan's		United Kingdom, Ireland	W & M Duncan and Company, best known as "Duncan's of Edinburgh"	Milk chocolate bars with various ingredients: mint, toffee, ginger and hazelnut	

== E ==
Name	Image	Distribution	Manufacturer	Description	Ref.
E. Wedel		Poland	Lotte		
Eat-more		Canada	Hershey	Chewy dark toffee, peanuts and chocolate	
Echo			Fox	Replaced with the Velvety bar	

== F ==
Name	Image	Distribution	Manufacturer	Description	Ref.
Fazer		Finland	Fazer		
Feastables		Worldwide	Machu Picchu Foods SAC	Milk Chocolate Bar	
Ferrero Rocher Chocolate Bars		Worldwide	Ferrero SpA	Chocolate and hazelnut bars.	
Flake		New Zealand, United Kingdom, Ireland, Canada, Australia, South Africa	Cadbury	Crumbly chocolate "flake"	
Flyte (1996–2015)		United Kingdom	Mars	Fluffy chocolate mousse style nougat enrobed in milk chocolate	
Forever Yours		United States	Mars	Vanilla nougat and caramel in dark chocolate	
Freddo		New Zealand, Australia, United Kingdom, Ireland	Cadbury	Milk chocolate in a frog shape	
Freska!		Egypt	Edita Food Industries		
Frigor (1923–present)		Switzerland	Nestlé	Milk chocolate bar with praline filling	
Frey Chocolate Bars		Worldwide	Migros	Swiss Chocolate	
Fry's Chocolate Cream		United Kingdom, Ireland	Cadbury	Fondant centre enrobed in plain chocolate. It is the world's oldest brand of chocolate bar.	
Fry's Turkish Delight		Australia, New Zealand, United Kingdom, Ireland	Cadbury	Rosewater jelly in milk chocolate	
Fudge		New Zealand, United Kingdom, Ireland	Cadbury	Fudge covered in milk chocolate	
Fuse		United Kingdom, India	Cadbury	Comes in various varieties with peanuts, raisins, crisped rice, and fudge pieces enrobed in milk chocolate	
French nougat		Sweden	Marabou	Nougat with meringue, a touch of honey and nuts	

== G ==
Name	Image	Distribution	Manufacturer	Description	Ref.
Galaxy		United Kingdom, Ireland, the Isle of Man, South Africa, Morocco, Malta, the Middle East, Pakistan, India, Australia	Mars	Milk chocolate bar	
Ghana (named after the West African country with same name)		South Korea, Japan, United Kingdom	Lotte	Milk chocolate with extra cacao	
Ghirardelli		Worldwide	Lindt & Sprüngli	Milk chocolate, Dark chocolate	
Godiva Signature		United States, Canada, Europe, Middle East, Japan, South Korea, Australia, New Zealand, China	Yıldız Holding	Milk chocolate, dark chocolate, almond chocolate	
Goldenberg's Peanut Chews		United States, United Kingdom	Just Born	Peanuts and molasses enrobed in chocolate	
Goya		Philippines	Delfi Limited	Milk chocolate, dark chocolate, white chocolate bars	
Green & Blacks		United Kingdom and Ireland	Kraft Foods	A variety of organic, flavored, luxury chocolate bars: dark, milk, white, ginger, almond, cherry, spices and butterscotch	
Guylian		Worldwide	Lotte	Milk chocolate, Dark chocolate	

== H ==
Name	Image	Distribution	Manufacturer	Description	Ref.
Happy Hippo		Germany, United Kingdom, Ireland, Mainland Europe	Ferrero SpA	A hippo-shaped wafer with hazelnut, chocolate, and milk-caramel cream filling	
Heath Bar		United States, Canada	Hershey	Crunchy English-style almond toffee with milk chocolate coating	
Heavenly Hash Egg		United States	Elmer Chocolate	Marshmallow center and two roasted almonds in a milk chocolate coating	
Hello		Europe, North America and Australia	Lindt & Sprüngli	Chocolate bars with various fillings	
Hershey Bar		Worldwide	Hershey	Solid milk chocolate	
Hershey Bar with Almonds		Worldwide	Hershey	Solid milk chocolate with almonds	
Hershey's Air Delight		United States (Discontinued)	Hershey	Aerated milk Chocolate.	
Hershey's Cookies 'n' Chocolate		Worldwide	Hershey	Solid milk chocolate with cookie bits	
Hershey's Cookies 'n' Creme		Worldwide	Hershey	Solid candy bar made with white chocolate creme and cookie bits	
Hershey's Cookies 'n' Mint		United States, Canada, Europe and the Philippines	Hershey	Solid mint flavored white chocolate with cookie bits	
Hershey's Crunchy Waffle Cone		United States, Canada	Hershey	Solid milk chocolate with crunchy waffle cone.	
Hershey's Gold Bar		United States (discontinued)	Hershey	caramelized white chocolate candy bar made with peanut butter.	
Hershey's Plant Based Chocolate		Worldwide	Hershey	Plant-based milk chocolate made with oats	
Hershey's S'more Bar		United States (Discontinued)	Hershey	Milk Chocolate with the interior of Marshmallow fluff and Graham Crackers	
Hershey's Special Dark		Worldwide	Hershey	Solid dark chocolate	
Hershey White with Almonds		United States, Canada	Hershey	Solid white chocolate creme with almonds	
Hershey Tropical Bar		United States	Hershey		
Double Nougat		Sweden	Marabou	A smooth almond nougat and a layer dark, creamy hazelnut nougat	

== I ==
Name	Image	Distribution	Manufacturer	Description	Ref.
Idaho Spud		United States	Idaho Candy Company	Chocolate marshmallow covered with chocolate and coconut	

== J ==
Name	Image	Distribution	Manufacturer	Description	Ref.
Jersey Milk		Canada	Neilson	Creamy solid milk chocolate	
Jet		Colombia	Colombina	Milk chocolate	
Jimmie Stix		United States	Boyer	Pretzels and peanut butter in milk chocolate	
Japp Peanut		Sweden	Marabou	roasted crunchy peanuts, soft, cacao meringue and soft caramel covered in milk chocolate	
Japp		Sweden	Marabou	Soft cacao meringue and soft caramel covered in milk chocolate	

== K ==
Name	Image	Distribution	Manufacturer	Description	Ref.
Kägi fret (1952–present)		Switzerland	Kägi Söhne	Chocolate coated wafers	
Karl Fazer Milk Chocolate		Finland	Fazer	Milk chocolate bar	
Kinder Bueno		Worldwide	Ferrero SpA	Hazelnut cream filled wafer with a chocolate covering	
Kinder Chocolate		Worldwide	Ferrero SpA	Milk chocolate with milky filling.	
Kit Kat		Worldwide	Nestlé (worldwide), Hershey (United States)	Wafers covered in milk chocolate. Over 200 varieties worldwide; over 300 varieties in Japan alone, with most being limited editions (seasonal and regional).	
Kit Kat Big Kat		United States	Hershey	larger version of Kit Kats	
Kex with hazelnut		Sweden	Marabou	Four layers of crispy wafers, milk chocolate hazelnut filling	
Kit Kat Chunky		Worldwide (except United States)	Nestlé	Larger version of Kit Kats	
Kit Kat Delights		India	Nestlé	premium version of Kit Kats	
Kit Kat Duo		United States, Japan, Thailand, Malaysia, Singapore	Nestlé (Asia), Hershey (United States)	Wafers covered in dual of milk chocolate and flavored white chocolate (like mint, mocha, strawberry, matcha)	
Krackel		United States, Canada	Hershey	Milk chocolate with crisped rice	
Krembanan		Norway	Nidar	Chocolate, gel and banana cream	
Kvikk Lunsj		Norway, Sweden	Freia	A thickly coated chocolate wafer, similar to Kit Kat in taste and design	

== L ==
Name	Image	Distribution	Manufacturer	Description	Ref.
L'Agie		Indonesia	Fajar Mataram Sedayu		
La Fama		United States	Palmer Candy Co.	Caramel covered with milk chocolate	
Leonidas		Worldwide		Milk chocolate, dark chocolate	
Lindor		Worldwide	Lindt & Sprüngli	Chocolate bar with creamy filling, also available in truffles and various flavours. Lindor bars have been made since 1949.	
Lindt Excellence		Worldwide	Lindt & Sprüngli	Many varieties of dark chocolate bars which include coconut dark chocolate, no sugar added dark chocolate, roasted hazelnut dark chocolate, and more	
Lindt Swiss Classic		Worldwide	Lindt & Sprüngli	Many varieties which include double milk chocolate; almond, sea salt dark chocolate; fruit and milk chocolate, intense orange and more	
Lion Bar		United Kingdom, Ireland, Europe, Middle East, South Africa, Poland, Canada, Tajikistan	Nestlé	Wafers and crisped cereal with caramel in milk chocolate	
Lily's		United States	Lily's Sweets / Hershey	Dark, extra dark, milk, and white chocolate bars with various flavours and fillings. Sweetened with stevia.	

== M ==
Name	Image	Distribution	Manufacturer	Description	Ref.
M-Azing		United States (discontinued)	Mars	Milk chocolate with mini M&M's	
M&M's Chocolate Bars		Europe, Mexico, Southeast Asia, Taiwan, United States (discontinued), Canada (discontinued)	Mars	Milk chocolate bars with mini M&M's.	
Magnum Signature Chocolate		Europe, Australia, New Zealand, United States, Canada	The Magnum Ice Cream Company	Chocolate Blocks	
Malagos		The Philippines	Malagos Agri-Ventures	Dark chocolate	
Mars Bar		United States	Mars	Vanilla nougat with almonds and milk chocolate	
Mars Bar		Worldwide (except United States)	Mars	Nougat mousse topped with caramel and coated in chocolate	
Mars Bar Lava		Australia, New Zealand	Mars	Orange-flavored nougat center	
Maruja		Worldwide	Borrás S.L.		
Meiji Chocolate		Japan	Meiji Co.	Premium Chocolate	
Mekupelet		Israel	Strauss-Elite	Milk chocolate folded over, with thin layers of chocolate separated by air; similar to aerated chocolate, but with folds instead of bubbles	
Milka		Worldwide	Kraft Foods	Swiss milk chocolate	
Milky Bar		Worldwide (onlines only for United States)	Nestlé	White chocolate bar	
Milky Way		United States	Mars	Chocolate nougat with caramel in milk chocolate coating. Pictured here are American and British Milky Way candy bars. There is no caramel in the British version.	
Milky Way		Worldwide (except United States, Canada)	Mars	Whipped nougat in milk chocolate coating	
Milky Way Midnight		United States	Mars	Vanilla nougat with caramel in dark chocolate coating.	
Milo Bar		Australia, New Zealand, Asia, Europe & Africa	Nestlé		
Mimi Chocolate		Bangladesh	Bangladesh Freedom Fighter Welfare Trust		
Minor		Switzerland	Maestrani	Praline bars. Made since 1936.	
Mirage		Canada	Nestlé	Bubbly milk chocolate	
Moro		New Zealand, Ireland, Australia	Cadbury	Nougat-like chocolate mousse and biscuit topped with caramel and coated in chocolate	
Mounds		United States	Hershey (previously Peter Paul & Cadbury)	Sweetened coconut enrobed in dark or milk chocolate; introduced in 1921	
Mountain Bar		United States	Brown and Haley	Vanilla, cherry, or peanut butter cream filling, covered in chocolate and peanuts, in the shape of Mount Rainier	
Mousse		Australia, South Africa	Cadbury	Milk chocolate with a rich soft chocolate filling	
Mr. Big		Worldwide	Cadbury	Crisped rice, peanuts, caramel, and a vanilla wafer center covered in Cadbury milk chocolate	
Mr. Goodbar		United States	Hershey	Peanuts in granular milk chocolate	
Munz Bar		Switzerland	Maestrani	Praline-filled chocolate bar	

== N ==
Name	Image	Distribution	Manufacturer	Description	Ref.
Neapolitan Coconut Slice (named after the ice cream with the same name)		United States	Friesinger's Candies	Tri-coloured coconut bar - strawberry/vanilla/chocolate	
Nesquik Bars		Europe, United States (discontinued), Canada (discontinued)	Nestlé	Milk chocolate with cream and strawberry filling.	
Nestlé Classic		India, South America	Nestlé	Solid milk chocolate	
Nestlé Extrain		Spain	Nestlé	Solid milk chocolate	
Nestlé Milk Chocolate		Worldwide (discontinued)	Nestlé	Solid milk chocolate	
Nestlé Munch		India, Bangladesh, Pakistan	Nestlé	Crunchy Milk Chocolate Wafers.	
Nestlé Munch Crunchie		India	Nestlé	Milk Chocolate with crunchy rice krispies.	
Nestlé Sustainably Sourced Cocoa		Worldwide	Nestlé	Swiss milk chocolate	
Nestlé Swiss		Worldwide	Nestlé	Solid swiss milk chocolate	
Nestlé Triple Decker bar		United States	Nestlé	Three-layer bar consisting of a bottom layer of milk chocolate, middle layer of white chocolate and top layer of dark chocolate; approx. 2.5" square. Discontinued.	
Nestlé Toll House Candy Bars		United States, Canada	Nestlé	milk chocolate covered cookies and brownies, discontinued in 2007.	
Nestlé White		United States, Denmark	Nestlé	White chocolate	
Neuhaus		Worldwide		Luxury chocolates	
Nickel Lunch		United States		Peanuts in milk chocolate	
Niki		South Africa	Beacon	Chocolate coated coconut bar	
Nocciolatte		Worldwide	Lindt & Sprüngli	Three hazelnuts and hazelnut filling in milk chocolate. Also available in dark version	
Nosh		South Africa	Beacon	Chocolate coated nougat with caramel and nuts topping	
Nougatti		Belgium, worldwide	Côte d'Or; Kraft Foods	Chewy and nutty nougat made with chopped hazelnuts covered in Côte d'Or milk chocolate	
Nut Lovers		United States	Hershey		
NutRageous		United States, United Kingdom, Ireland	Hershey	Peanut butter, caramel and peanuts in milk chocolate	
Nuts		United Kingdom, Europe	Nestlé	Nougat and hazelnuts covered with chocolate	
Nuts About Caramel		United Kingdom	Cadbury	Caramel enrobed in milk chocolate	
Nux		United Kingdom	Rowntree	Whole hazelnuts, Montelimar nougat and caramel covered in milk chocolate	

== O ==
Name	Image	Distribution	Manufacturer	Description	Ref.
Old Faithful		United States	Idaho Candy Company	Marshmallow center, covered with chocolate and whole peanuts	
Oh Henry!		United States, Canada	Ferrara (United States, formerly Nestlé), Hershey (Canada)	Caramel, fudge and peanuts in milk chocolate	
ONE		United States, Canada	Hershey	Milk and white chocolate covered protein bars, with flavors (like Hershey bar, Cookies n' creme and Reese's)	
Oreo		Sweden	Marabou	Smooth milk chocolate with a creamy vanilla filling and crushed Oreos	
Ovolino		Switzerland	Ovaltine	Praline and malt-filled chocolate bar	

== P ==
Name	Image	Distribution	Manufacturer	Description	Ref.
Pal-o-mine		Canada	Ganong Bros. Limited	Soft fudge centre with peanuts covered in dark chocolate	
PB Max		United States	Mars	Creamy peanut butter and oats on top of a square-shaped whole grain cookie enrobed in milk chocolate	
Peanut Slab		New Zealand, Australia	Whittaker's	Peanut infused chocolate slab	
Penguin		United Kingdom, Ireland	McVitie's	Milk-chocolate covered biscuit filled with chocolate cream	
Peppermint Crisp		Australia, South Africa	Nestlé	Peppermint "cracknel" in milk chocolate	
Perk		India	Cadbury	Crunchy Milk Chocolate Wafers.	
Perky Nana		New Zealand	Cadbury	Banana flavored chew bar covered in chocolate	
Pesek Zman		Israel	Strauss-Elite	Chocolate coated hazelnut cream filled wafer	
Picnic		Australia, New Zealand, United Kingdom, Ireland, India, Canada, Ukraine, Russia, South Africa	Cadbury	Peanuts, caramel, wafers and crisped rice in milk chocolate	
Pigall		Sweden	Marabou	Light, whipped hazelnut truffle coated in milk chocolate	
Pistache		United States	Sulpice Chocolat	Painted chocolate bar - pistachios, cardamom and orange in dark chocolate	
Polly Waffle		Australia	Nestlé	Marshmallow-filled wafers in milk chocolate	
Powerhouse		United States	Peter Paul	Peanuts, caramel and nougat in milk chocolate	
Prince		Malaysia	Danone	Two chocolate-flavored soda cracker wafers in chocolate-flavored coating	
Prince Polo		Poland, Iceland	Kraft	Chocolate-covered wafers	
Princessa		Poland	Nestlé	Nestlé imitation of Prince Polo; now equally popular	
P.S.		South Africa	Cadbury	Originally a caramel dark chocolate coated wafer, it expanded to milk chocolate and white milk chocolate later on	

== Q ==
Name	Image	Distribution	Manufacturer	Description	Ref.
Quality Street Blocks		Worldwide (except United States)	Nestlé	Milk Chocolate Blocks	

== R ==
Name	Image	Distribution	Manufacturer	Description	Ref.
Ragusa		Switzerland	Camille Bloch	Swiss praline chocolate with whole hazelnuts, also available in dark and caramelised milk versions. Made since 1942	
Raffaello		Italy, Russia, Canada, Belgium	Ferrero	Coconut–almond truffle	
Rally		United States	Hershey	Canadian made Oh Henry! under the name Rally; nougat, caramel and peanuts covered in milk chocolate	
Rayon		Switzerland	Nestlé	Milk chocolate with air bubbles. Made since 1937	
Reese's Bar		United States, Canada	Hershey	Peanut butter enrobed in milk chocolate	
Reese's Crispy Crunchy Bar		United States, Canada	Hershey	Peanut butter crisp candy with peanut butter and chopped peanuts in milk chocolate	
Reese's Fast Break		United States, Canada	Hershey	Peanut butter and nougat filling in milk chocolate	
Reese's Outrageous		Worldwide	Hershey	Reese's Pieces, peanut butter, and caramel enrobed in milk chocolate.	
Reese's Sticks		Worldwide	Hershey	Wafers filled with peanut butter and covered in milk chocolate	
Regina		Portugal	Regina	Milk chocolate with different fillings.	
Risoletto		Switzerland	Chocolat Frey	Caramel and crisped rice in milk chocolate. Made since 1967.	
Ritter Sport		Worldwide	Ritter Sport	Square chocolate bar with various fillings	
Rocky Road		United States	Annabelle Candy Company	Marshmallow topped with cashews and covered with chocolate	
Rolo Blocks		Australia, New Zealand	Nestlé	Milk Chocolate & caramel Blocks	
Roshen		Europe, Asia, North America	Roshen		
Russell Stover Chocolate Bars		Worldwide	Lindt & Sprüngli	Sugar free chocolate bars	

== S ==
Name	Image	Distribution	Manufacturer	Description	Ref.
Safari		India, Saudi Arabia, Lebanon, Egypt, and Philippines	Gandour	Wafer and crisped rice covered in caramel in milk chocolate	
Sasha Chocolate Goldleaf		South Korea	Lotte	Chocolate with real gold leaf layering	
Scorched Peanut Bar		Australia	Cooks Confectionary	Peanuts baked in toffee covered in chocolate	
Silver Queen		Indonesia	Perusahaan Industri Ceres		
Skor		United States, Canada	Hershey	Crunchy butter toffee in milk chocolate	
Sky Bar		United States	Necco	Four sections: caramel, vanilla, peanut butter and fudge fillings with a milk chocolate coating	
Skotte		Sweden	Marabou	A creamy dark nougat with crushed nuts and raisins coated in dark chocolate	
Smarties		South Africa, Australia	Nestlé	Milk chocolate bar filled with Smarties	
Smooth Sailin'		United States	Hollywood Candy Co.	Nougat with walnut pieces covered in dark chocolate	
Snickers		Worldwide	Mars	Nougat topped with caramel and peanuts in milk chocolate. Was branded in the United Kingdom as Marathon from 1968 to 1990.	
Snickers Crisper		Worldwide	Mars	crisped rice topped with caramel and peanuts in milk chocolate.	
Snickers Peanut Butter		Worldwide	Mars	Nougat topped with caramel, peanut butter and peanuts in milk chocolate.	
Snickers Almond		Worldwide	Mars	Nougat topped with caramel, and almonds in milk chocolate.	
Snik Snak		United States (formerly)	Mars	Similar to Kit Kat; wafers in chocolate	
Starbar		United Kingdom, Ireland	Cadbury	Creamy peanut butter, light rice crisps and caramel covered with milk chocolate	
Sublime		Peru	D'Onofrio	Milk chocolate with peanuts	
Svoge		Bulgaria	Kraft Foods		
Sweet Marie		Canada	Cadbury (originally Willard's)	Fudge centre with peanuts and crisped rice covered in chocolate	
Symphony		United States	Hershey	identical milk chocolate	

== T ==
Name	Image	Distribution	Manufacturer	Description	Ref.
Take 5		United States, Canada	Hershey	Layer of caramel and peanut butter over pretzels and peanuts in milk chocolate	
Tex		South Africa	Nestlé	A combination of the aerated chocolate of Aero and the wafers of Kit Kat covered in milk chocolate	
The Belgian		Worldwide	The Belgian Confectionery	Premium Belgian chocolate	
Tim Tam		Worldwide	Arnott's	Chocolate covered biscuit/cookie filled with chocolate cream and other ingredients. There are five varieties: milk chocolate, dark chocolate, white chocolate, caramel and double-coated.	
Time Out		New Zealand, Australia, United Kingdom, Ireland	Cadbury	Wafers with a flake center covered in milk chocolate	
Tin Larin		Mexico, Latin America	Nestlé	Wafers and peanut butter in chocolate	
To'ak Chocolate		Ecuador	To'ak Chocolate	Handmade from the rare Nacional variety of cocoa bean	
Toblerone		Worldwide	Kraft Foods	Solid swiss milk chocolate with almond nougat bits	
Toffee Crisp		United Kingdom, Ireland	Nestlé	Crisped rice and soft caramel in milk chocolate	
Tony's Chocolonely		United States, Europe	Tony's Chocolonely	Milk and dark chocolate with various flavors added	
Top Deck		South Africa, Australia	Cadbury	White chocolate peaks layered on top of a milk chocolate base	
Topic		Poland, United Kingdom, Ireland	Masterfoods Polska	Hazelnuts, nougat and caramel in milk chocolate	
Torino		Switzerland	Camille Bloch	Chocolate bar filled with almond-hazelnut praline; also available in dark and caramelised milk versions. Made since 1948.	
Trio		United Kingdom	United Biscuits	Biscuit base with toffee cream enrobed in milk chocolate. Sold under the McVitie's brand. Discontinued in 2013, was brought back in 2016.	
Túró Rudi		Hungary	Túró Rudi	Cream cheese and chocolate	
Turtles		United States, Canada	Yıldız Holding (United States), Nestlé (Canada, imported)	milk chocolate with caramel and pecans.	
TV Bar		South Africa	Beacon	Chocolate coated crisped rice and coconut	
Twin Bing		United States	Palmer Candy Co.	Cherry cream center with chocolate and peanut coating	
Twirl		New Zealand, Australia, South Africa, Canada, Ireland, United Kingdom	Cadbury	Long flakes of milk chocolate covered in a chocolate coating	
Twix		Worldwide	Mars	Cookie bar with two fingers of shortbread cookie base topped with caramel and covered in milk chocolate	
Twix Cookies n' Creme		United States	Mars	Dark chocolate cookie bar with two fingers of shortbread cookie base topped with vanilla cream with cookie crumbles and covered in milk chocolate	

== U ==
Name	Image	Distribution	Manufacturer	Description	Ref.
U-No Bar		United States	Annabelle Candy Company	Milk chocolate truffle-like center covered with milk chocolate and ground almonds	

== V ==
Name	Image	Distribution	Manufacturer	Description	Ref.
Vergani		Worldwide	Vergani Secondo SpA		
Velvety			Fox	Replaced the Echo Bar	
Verkade		Netherlands		Various chocolate bars	
Vice Versas		United Kingdom	Nestlé	Milk chocolate covered in white sugar coating and white chocolate covered in chocolate sugar coating	
Violet Crumble		Australia	Robern Menz	Aerated crunchy honeycomb-like center in milk chocolate	

== W ==
Name	Image	Distribution	Manufacturer	Description	Ref.
Walnut Crush		United States	Fenn	White nougat and walnuts covered in dark chocolate	
Waterbridge		Worldwide	Waterbridge Confectionery	Premium Belgian and Swiss chocolates	
Welch's Fudge		United States	James O. Welch Co.	Chocolate fudge bar with chocolate coating	
Whatchamacallit		United States, Canada	Hershey	Peanut-flavored crisp with caramel in chocolate coating	
Whip		Australia	Cadbury	Fluffy nougat and caramel in milk chocolate	
White Knight		Australia	Nestlé	Chewy mint nougat in milk chocolate	
Whittaker's		New Zealand	J.H. Whittaker & Sons	Chocolate blocks, toffee milk, k-bar, slabs, mini slabs, chunks, squares, sante	
Willocrisp		Canada	Neilson	Crispy peanut butter in a chocolatey coating	
Wispa		United Kingdom, Ireland	Cadbury	Smooth velvety chocolate bar. Launched in 1981, discontinued in 2003, relaunched in 2007 temporarily, but relaunched again in 2008 permanently.	
Wonka Bar		New Zealand, United States, Australia, United Kingdom, South Africa	Nestlé	Graham cracker bits in chocolate; originally appeared as a fictional chocolate bar in Charlie and the Chocolate Factory and its adaptations Willy Wonka & the Chocolate Factory and Charlie and the Chocolate Factory.	
Wunderbar		Canada, Germany, Ireland	Cadbury	Creamy peanut butter, light crisped rice and caramel covered with milk chocolate; the Canadian and German equivalent of Cadbury's Starbar	

== Y ==
Name	Image	Distribution	Manufacturer	Description	Ref.
Yankie Bar		Denmark	Toms International	Caramel, nougat, and milk chocolate bar	
York Wafer Bars		United States, Canada, United Kingdom	Hershey	Dark chocolate covered wafer bars with mint flavored creme.	
Yorkie		United Kingdom, Ireland	Nestlé	Chunky chocolate bar. Available in 2 varieties, plain and raisin with biscuit	

== Z ==
Name	Image	Distribution	Manufacturer	Description	Ref.
Zero		United States	Hershey	Soft caramel, peanuts, and almond nougat enrobed in a layer of white fudge.	

== See also ==
- List of bean-to-bar chocolate manufacturers
- List of confectionery brands
- Candy bar, which includes a list of candy bars that do not contain chocolate
