= Mary Duncan (disambiguation) =

Mary Duncan (1894–1993) was an American stage- and film actress.

Mary Duncan may also refer to:

- Mary Duncan (writer) (born 1941), American writer, publisher, and educator
- Mary Ellen Duncan (1941–2022), American academic administrator and teacher
- Mary Lundie Duncan (1814–1840), Scottish poet and hymnwriter
- Mary Duncan, co-founder of W & M Duncan and Company
- Mary Duncan Library, Benson, North Carolina
- Mary Duncan, fictional character in The House by the Churchyard
