= Moro (chocolate bar) =

Brand of chocolate bar

- Australia and New Zealand Moro
- Product type: Confectionery
- Current owner: Mondelez
- Related brands: Starbar
- Markets: Australasia; Egypt

Irish Moro

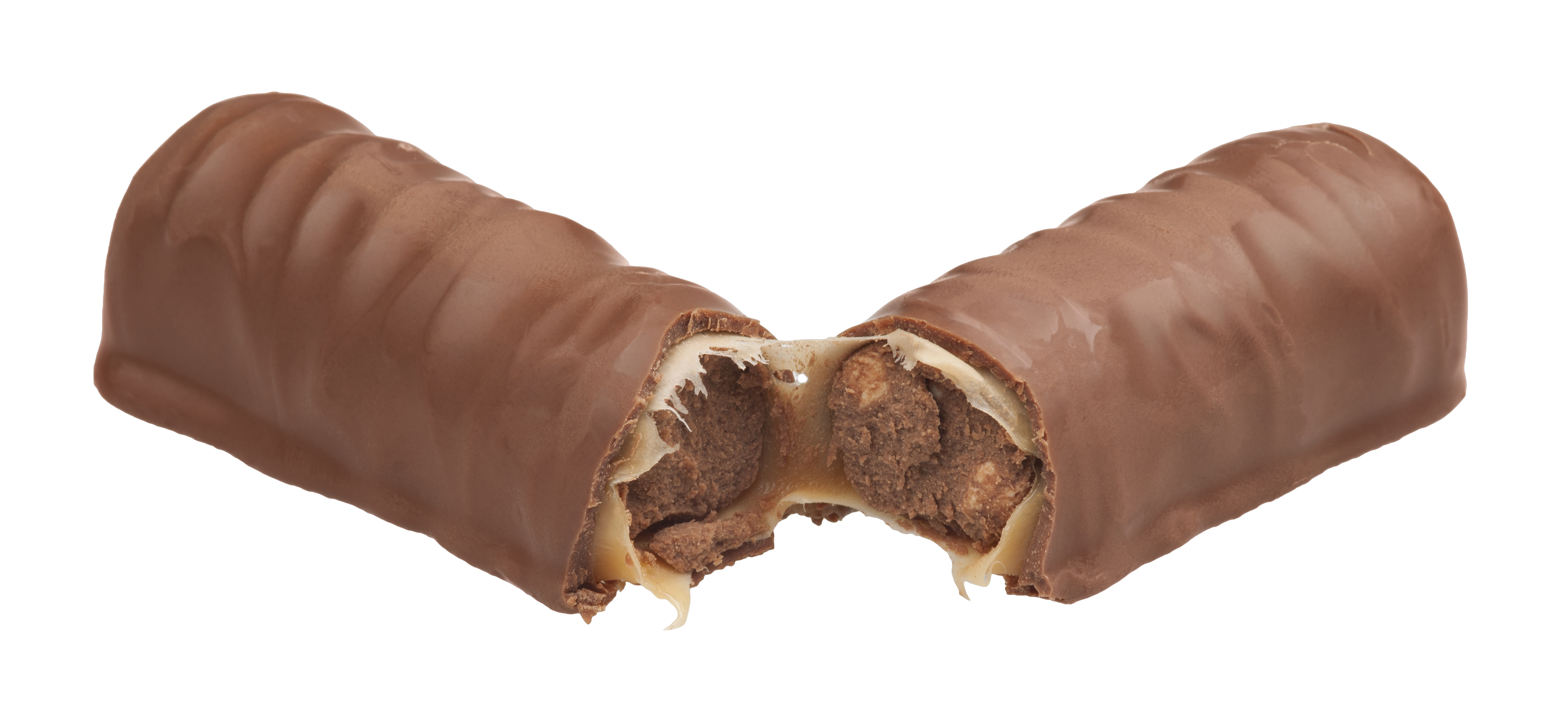
An Irish Moro bar split

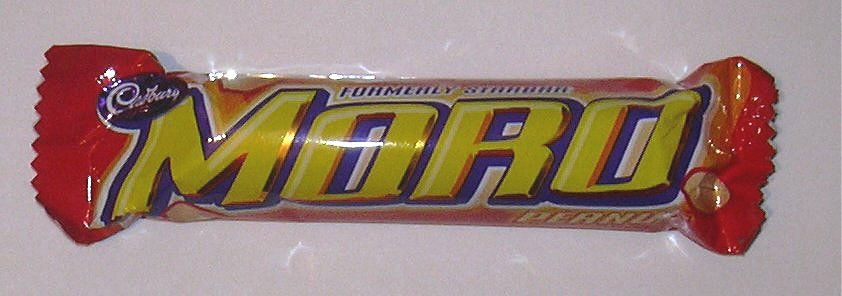
Irish Peanut Moro

Irish Coconut Moro

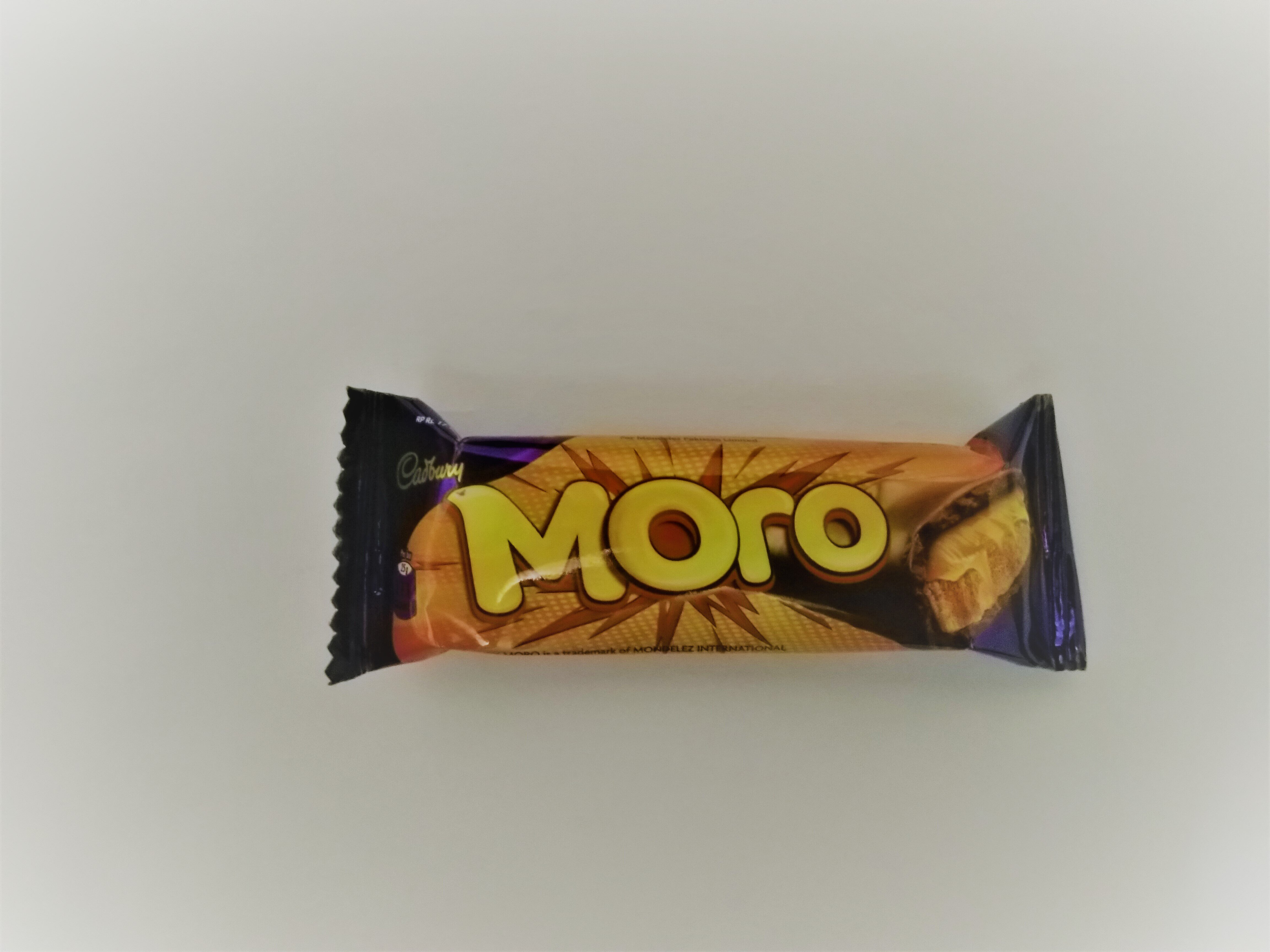
Pakistani Cadbury Moro

Moro is the brand name of a caramel and nougat layered chocolate bar currently made by Cadbury and sold in Australia, New Zealand, and the Middle East. This type is similar to the Mars bar or American-style Milky Way bar.

The name was also formerly used for a similar bar including bits of biscuit. It was sold in Ireland under the name until it was rebranded in 2015 as "Boost". In New Zealand, such a bar is sold as Moro Gold.

== Ireland ==
The Irish Moro consisted of nougat, biscuit and caramel filling and chocolate covering. The wrapper was blue, with the "Moro" logo in white. It was manufactured and sold in Ireland.

In May 2006, Moro Peanut was launched, with the words "Formerly Starbar" displayed prominently on the label; the wrapper on this variant was red. In the summer of 2007 a Coconut Moro bar was released as a limited edition in Ireland and colloquially known as the Bounty Moro. The wrapper is white with the Moro logo in yellow with a blue outline. In 2014 a Moro GAA special edition was launched in a deal with two sponsors of the GAA. The Moro brand was retired and replaced with Boost in 2015.

== Australasia and Middle East ==
The New Zealand bar has a black wrapper with "Moro" written in yellow (see side photo). The slogan is "Get more go" due to its high energy content. This bar has a whipped nougat and caramel centre and is covered in chocolate. There are three different types of Moro sold in New Zealand, the aforementioned 'standard Moro', the Moro Double Nut containing peanuts and hazelnuts, and the recently released Moro Gold, which is similar to the Irish Moro and the Boost Bar sold by Cadbury in Australia. It is available in New Zealand, and a very limited number of stores in Australia, although Moro is one of the miniature chocolate bars found in Cadbury Favourites. It is equivalent to the Australian or European Mars Bar, as well as being very close to the Australian Cadbury Whip, however within New Zealand it has eclipsed the Mars Bar, becoming something quintessentially Kiwi as well as Cadbury's best selling bar within New Zealand. It's stated on the fun facts page of the Cadbury New Zealand website that a Moro bar is consumed once every two seconds.

The deep-fried Moro bar is sold by New Zealand fish and chip shops as an alternative to the deep-fried Mars bar, particularly in Dunedin.

Moro is also produced in Egypt and Pakistan and distributed in adjacent markets. The brand is supported by commercials with the tag line "Recharge your energy".

=== End of production in New Zealand ===
In November 2009, Cadbury New Zealand announced the Moro Bar would no longer be produced at the factory in Dunedin, instead all production would move to Australia. This restructuring change has seen most Cadbury products previously made in New Zealand now made in Australia leaving the Dunedin factory to become a specialised factory producing boxed products such as Cadbury Roses, the Dunedin factory had a NZ$69 million upgrade with products made in New Zealand then exported to Australia and Asia. The change has resulted in the Moro bar and other products such as the Cadbury Picnic and Cadbury Pinky no longer being produced in New Zealand. In 2018 the Cadbury factory in Dunedin shut down completely and all production moved overseas, predominantly to Australia.

== UK ==
The Moro chocolate bar (the Irish variety described above) is sold under the name Boost in the UK, in a similar metallic blue wrapper, whilst the peanut version is sold as the Starbar.

== Historical variations ==
- Energy Moro - 1990 - dark chocolate with raisins
- Ice Cream Moro - 1990 - ice cream instead of nougat whip

== See also ==
- List of chocolate bar brands
