= Oh Henry! =

American candy bar

- Oh Henry! bar
- Type: Candy bar
- Place of origin: United States
- Created by: George Williamson
- Invented: 1920
- Main ingredients: Peanuts, caramel, and fudge
- Ingredients generally used: Chocolate

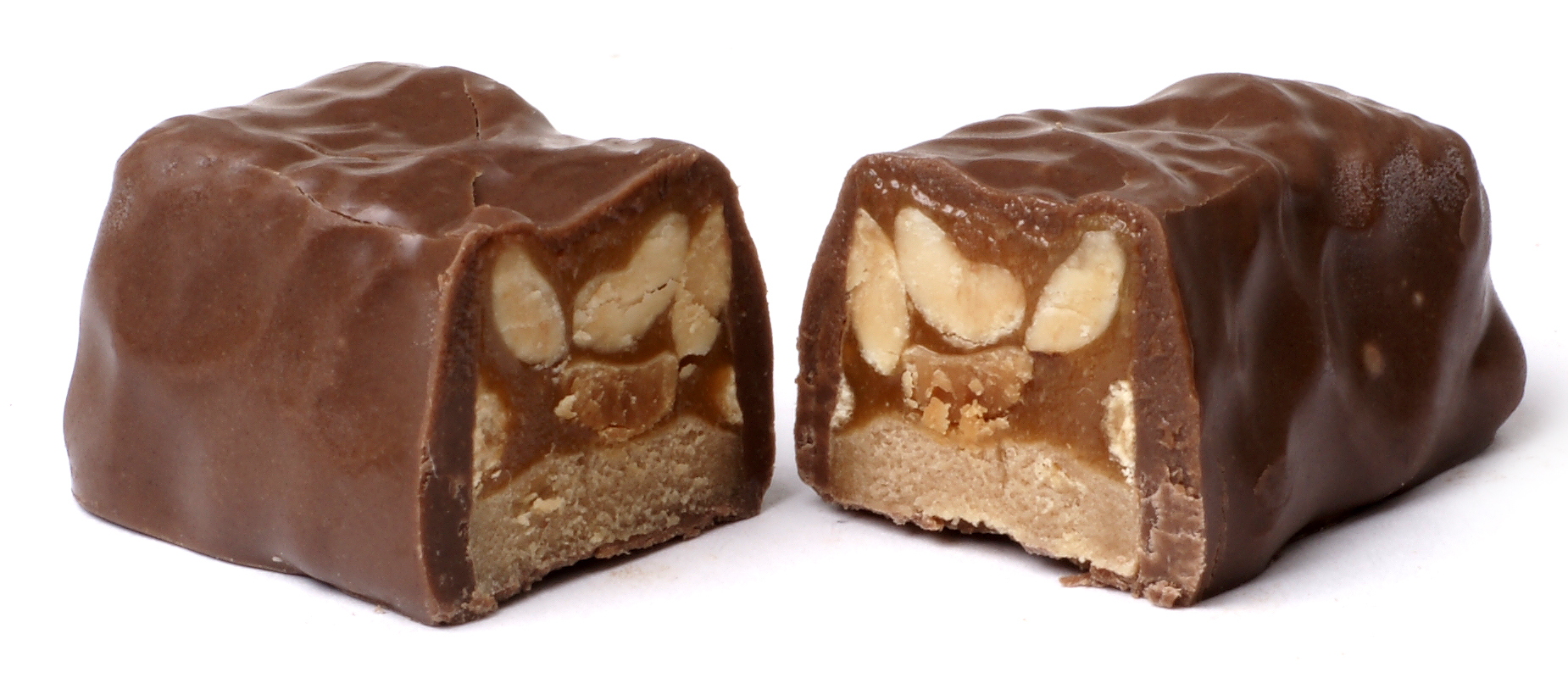
An Oh Henry! split

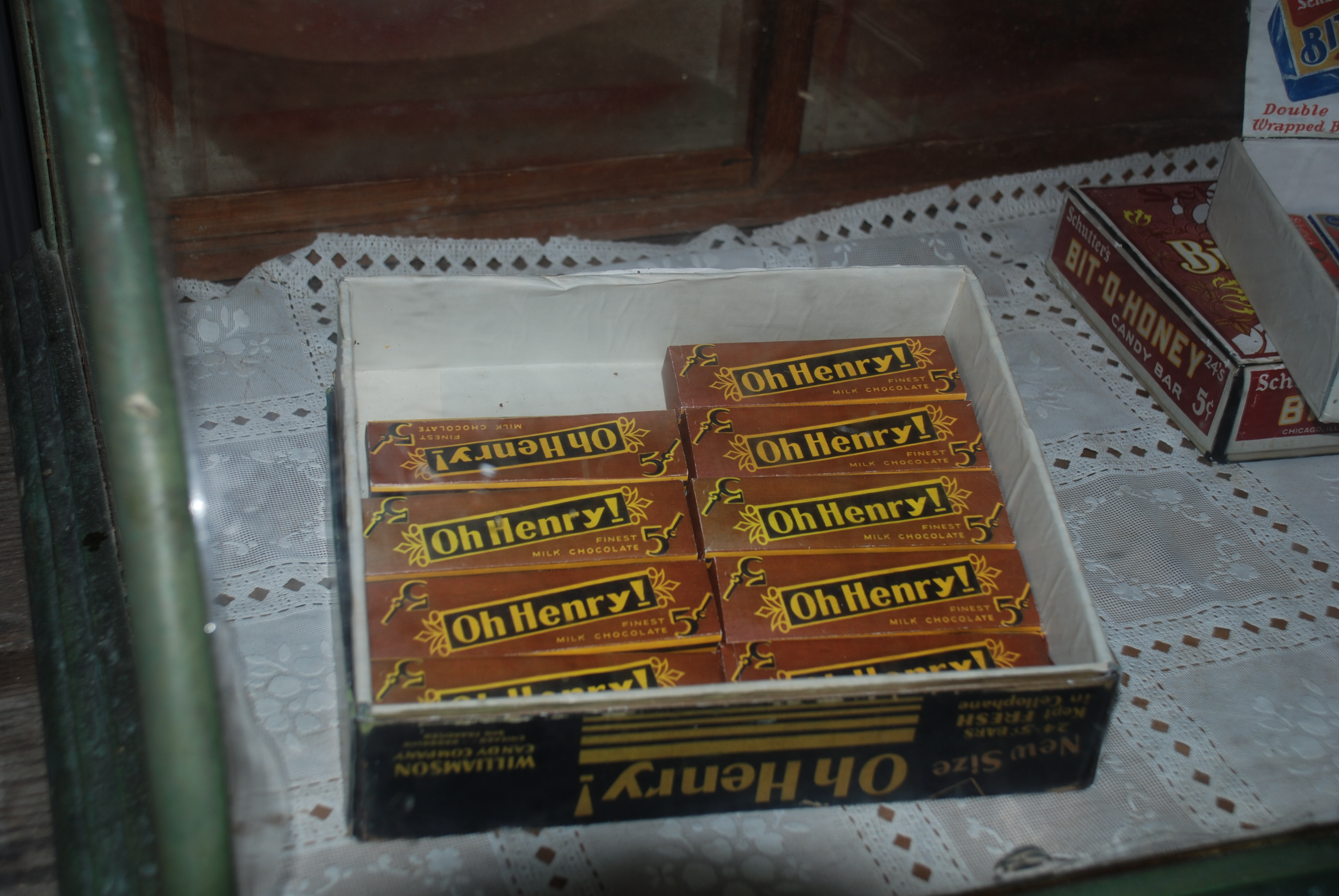
Box of vintage Oh Henry! candy bars at a general store in Portsmouth, North Carolina

Oh Henry! was an American candy bar containing peanuts, caramel, and fudge coated in chocolate, sold in the United States until 2019. A slightly different version of it is still manufactured and sold in Canada.

== History ==
There are multiple versions of the Oh Henry! bar origin story. The manufacturer Nestlé says that the bar was introduced by George Williamson and his Williamson Candy Company of Chicago in 1920 in the United States. The most popular alternate story, aside from the Canadian origin claimed by chocolatier Wilson McCutchan, is that Thomas Henry, manager of the Peerless Candy Co. in Arkansas City, Kansas, invented a bar he called the "Tom Henry Bar" in the late 1910s, and sold the recipe to George Williamson in 1920. There is no credible documentation of this story.

There are other alternate accounts of the origin of the name of the bar. One theory is that of a boy named Henry who frequented George Williamson's second candy shop. He became a favorite of the young girls who worked there, who would say "Oh Henry!" when speaking to or about him, and Williamson used this phrase to name his new confection. The other story is that the name is based on the pen name of William Sydney Porter, O. Henry. Williamson was thought by some to have been a fan of O. Henry stories, and an O. Henry story about peanuts might have been read by Williamson.

In 1926, Williamson released a booklet titled Sixty Ways to Serve a Famous Candy, which featured recipes and serving instructions that used the Oh Henry! bar. More than 8,000 recipes were submitted.

The Williamson Company was sold to Warner-Lambert in 1965, which soon sold Oh Henry! to Terson, Inc. Nestlé acquired the American rights to the brand from Terson in 1984. In 2018, Nestlé sold the rights to its American confectionery products to Ferrero SpA. Ferrero still produces an Oh Henry! branded bar in small production runs.

== Differences between Ferrero and Hershey versions ==
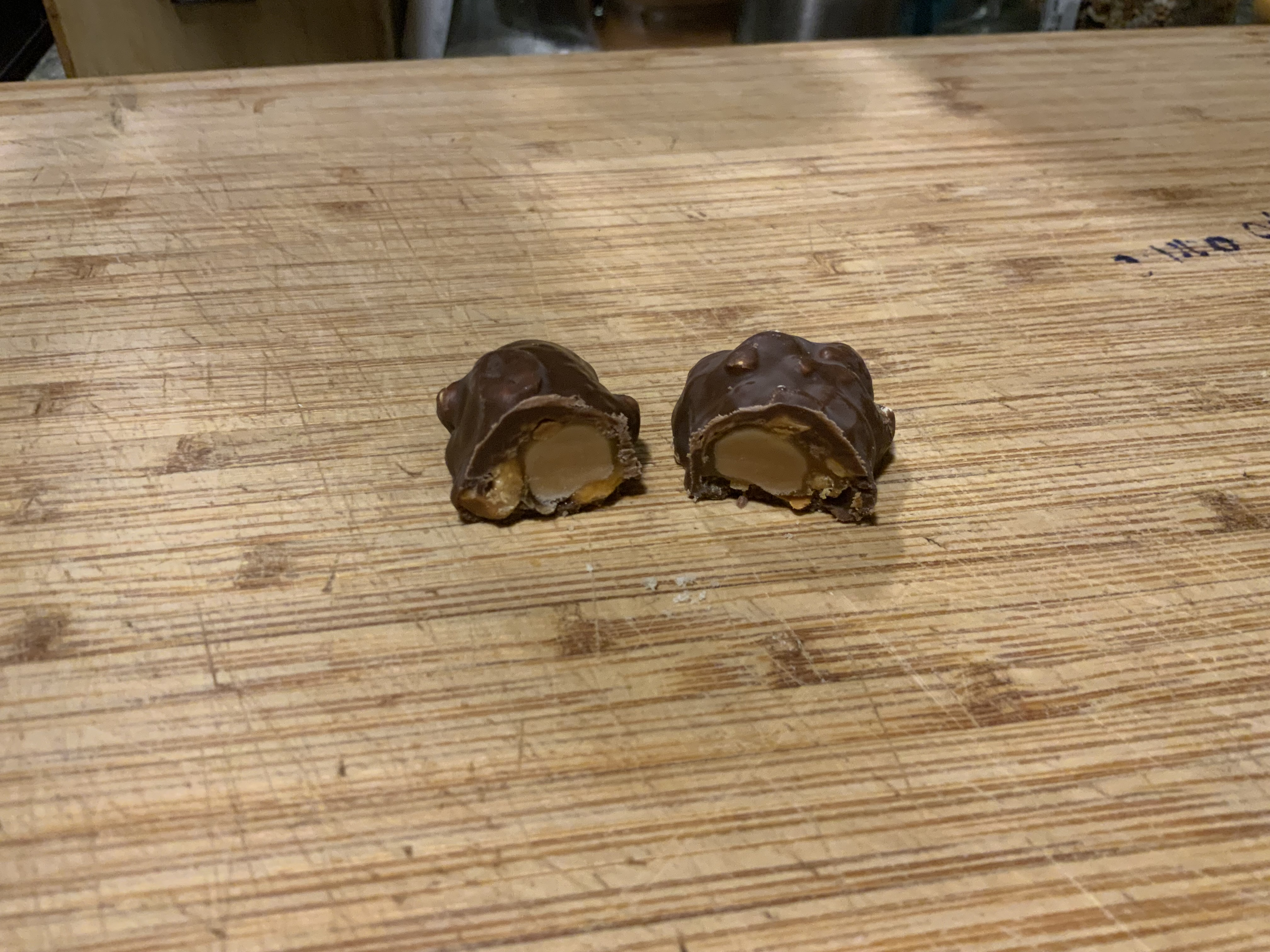
A Canadian Oh Henry! Split

In Canada, the bar is currently sold by the Hershey Company and was manufactured at their Smiths Falls, Ontario facilities prior to their closure. The bars are different in appearance: the Canadian version is one bar with the fudge in the centre, the fudge surrounded with a thin layer of caramel, and the nuts surrounding that layer before it is surrounded in the coating. Hershey sells Oh Henry! bars made in Canada on a very limited basis in the United States as Rally bars, using the trademark of a Hershey product introduced in the 1970s and later discontinued.

== Advertising ==
Television commercials showed the protagonist desperately searching for the Oh Henry! bar and finding it at the end, only to run into further trouble after eating it (e.g., while standing upon an unstable ladder; at a convenience store without cash).

In the 1980s, a series of commercials featuring comedian Gilbert Gottfried were produced. The commercials featured Gottfried trying to describe what made the Oh Henry! candy bar "so intense".

== See also ==
- List of chocolate bar brands
