= Crachi =

Chocolate bar

Crachi is the trade name of an inexpensive chocolate bar made of locally produced chocolate from the Dominican Republic and sold in that country by Chocolate Cortes, a Dominican and Puerto Rican chocolatier.

Consisting of milk chocolate and crisped rice, the Crachi bar is marketed as a low-cost alternative to more expensive fare, such as the similar Nestlé Crunch bar.

A Crachi bar retails for RD$15.00, or about US$0.42.

== See also ==
- List of chocolate bar brands
