= Friesinger =

Friesinger may refer to:

People

- Janina Urszula Friesinger, née Korowicka, (born 1954), a former ice speed skater from Poland
- Anni Friesinger-Postma (born 1977 in Bad Reichenhall), a German female speed skater, daughter of the above

Companies

- Friesinger's Candies, an Ohio-based confectionery company
