= Banjo (chocolate bar) =

Discontinued British chocolate bar

Banjo is a defunct British chocolate bar.

== Background ==
The original Banjo chocolate bar was sold in the Greater London area, UK, but the product was discontinued in 1954. At that time, it was a chocolate wafer bar, with a chocolate filling, covered in milk chocolate, rather similar to Kit Kat.

Banjo was reintroduced with a substantial television advertising campaign in 1976. In this reincarnation, Banjo was a twin bar (similar in shape and size to Twix) and was the same as a Drifter but with a chopped peanut layer and the whole covered in milk chocolate. It was packaged in distinctive navy blue - with the brand name prominently displayed in yellow block text - and was one of the first British snack bars to have a heat-sealed wrapper closure instead of the reverse-side fold common to most domestically produced chocolate bars at that time. It was available into the 1980s. There was a coconut version also available in a red wrapper with yellow text.

== See also ==
- List of chocolate bar brands
