= Carlos V (chocolate bar) =

Mexican chocolate bar

- Product type: Chocolate bar
- Current owner: Nestlé
- Country: Mexico
- Introduced: 1970; 56 years ago
- Website: nestle.com.mx/carlosv

Carlos V is a brand of Mexican chocolate bar, produced since the 1970s in Mexico and launched in 2005 in the United States by Nestlé.

== About ==
The bar is named in honor of Carlos V, Holy Roman Emperor (known in English as Charles V and sometimes called Carlos I in Spanish because that was his title as ruler of Spain.) He introduced chocolate to the courts of Europe.

The candy is known for its marketing slogan "El Rey de los Chocolates", Spanish for "The King of Chocolates". Nestlé refers to the candy in English as "The 'king' of bars in Mexico".

The brand is popular in Mexico. It was owned by the Mexican chocolate company La Azteca (The Aztec) from the 1970s until the 1990s, when the company was bought by Nestlé. La Azteca was formerly a subsidiary of Quaker Oats Company.

The confectionery bar is mainly milk chocolate and contains powdered milk.

== Availability ==
The product is available in a 6-pack, a 32-count convenience pack and a 96-count box. It is available mainly in Mexico, but also worldwide in certain stores.

== See also ==
- Nestlé Milk Chocolate
- Yorkie (chocolate bar)
- List of chocolate bar brands
