= Walnut Whip =

Chocolate confection by Nestlé

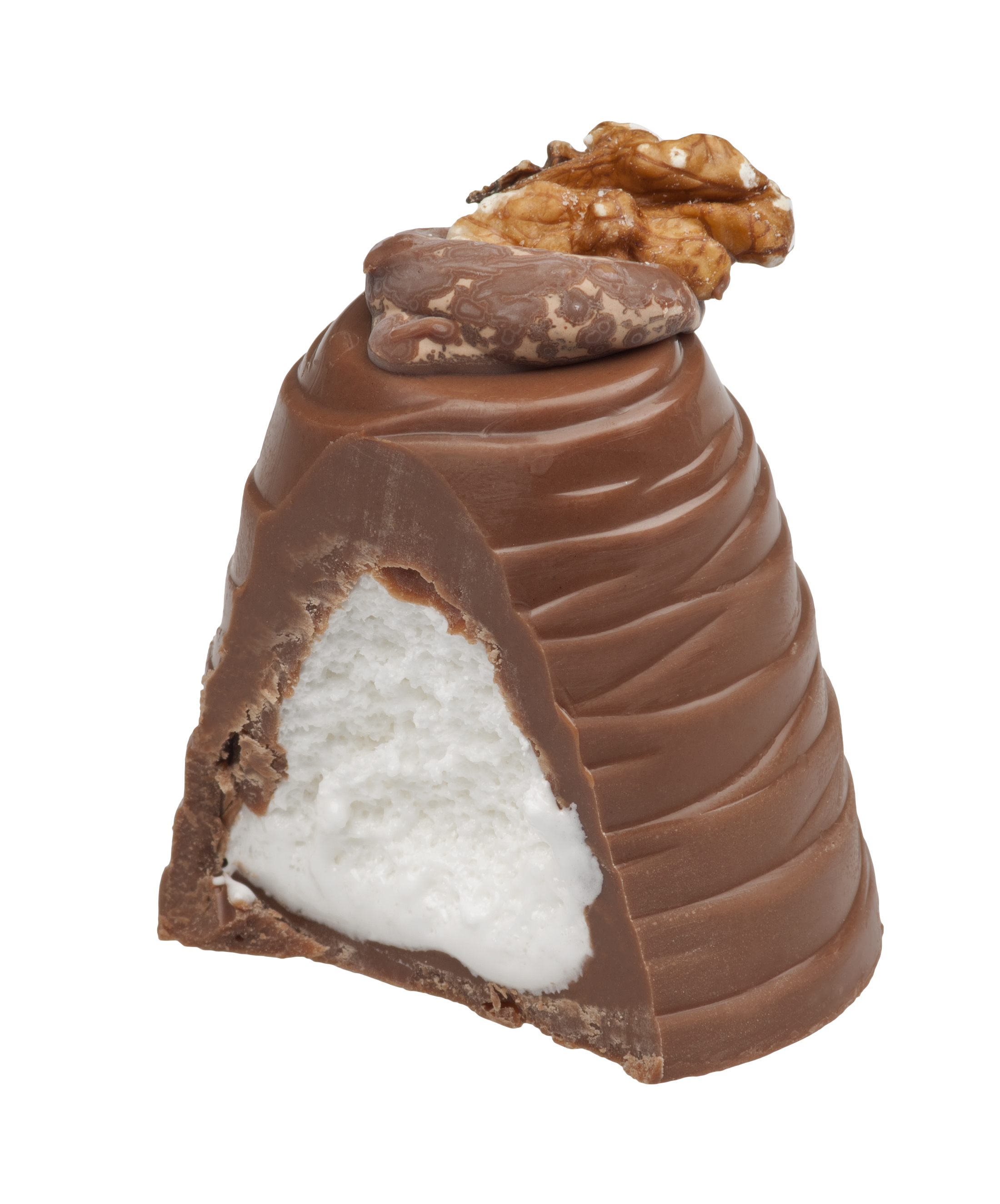
- Product type: Chocolate confection
- Current owner: Nestlé
- Country: UK
- Introduced: 1910; 116 years ago
- Previous owners: Duncan's of Edinburgh
- Website: nestle.co.uk/walnutwhip

A Walnut Whip is a whirl-shaped cone of milk chocolate with a whipped vanilla fondant filling and topped with a half-walnut.

== Origin ==
Launched in 1910 by Duncan's of Edinburgh, Walnut Whip is Nestlé Rowntree's oldest current brand.

== History ==
The original Walnut Whip contained a half-walnut, or more usually, walnuts that had been broken during handling and transportation and were therefore not suitable for placing on the top. It was later marketed with an extra walnut on top, and subsequently the walnut inside was removed to leave one walnut outside. Over one million walnuts, most of them imported from China and India, are used every week in the manufacture of Walnut Whips at Halifax, West Yorkshire. Nestlé claim that almost one Walnut Whip is eaten every two seconds in the UK. Originally manufactured by Duncan's of Edinburgh in their Beaverhall Road factory, there have been different flavours of Walnut Whip over the years, including coffee and maple flavours, but currently only vanilla is widely available.

When Rowntree's dispensed with the Duncan's brand name and manufacturing moved from Beaverhall Road in the late 1970s, the manufacturing process changed from handmade to hollow-moulded by machine. An attempt was made to recreate the original surface appearance but with limited success, and it now has no function other than decoration.

In 2017, Nestlé announced a new version with no walnuts and a change of name to the Whip. As of 2020 Mint and Caramel versions are also available. Nestlé is expanding the Whip range and launching new variants — "Delicate Vanilla", "Delicious Caramel" and "Delightful Mint" — to offer more choice with and without the walnut. The original Walnut Whip is still available in Spar, Nisa and other independent stores.

The chocolate cone itself and the vanilla fondant filling have been changed in recent years. The original whips were handmade by extruding chocolate from a piping bag onto a rubber mould, each containing 12 'formers'. This generated the original deeply ridged surface, and the fondant at that time was denser. The texture of the outside surface is a skeuomorph.

== In popular culture ==
Ken Livingstone, the mayor of London, famously said that the 2012 Summer Olympics would cost Londoners 38p per week (the price of a Walnut Whip).

The W Hotel in Edinburgh, Scotland has been nick-named "The Walnut Whip" due to its distinctive shape.

In his inaugural speech after being sworn in as the Lord Mayor of Bristol 2025–2026, Councillor Henry Michallat claimed that his great-grandfather was the inventor of the Walnut Whip.
