= Nestlé Munch =

Chocolate bar with tasty wafers

Munch
- Type: Chocolate bar
- Course: Snack
- Place of origin: India
- Region or state: Asia
- Created by: Nestlé
- Main ingredients: Chocolate, wafers
- Similar dishes: Munch Nuts

Nestlé Munch (not to be confused with Nestle Crunch) is a chocolate bar made by Nestlé and primarily sold in India. It is a long chocolate bar filled with wafers.

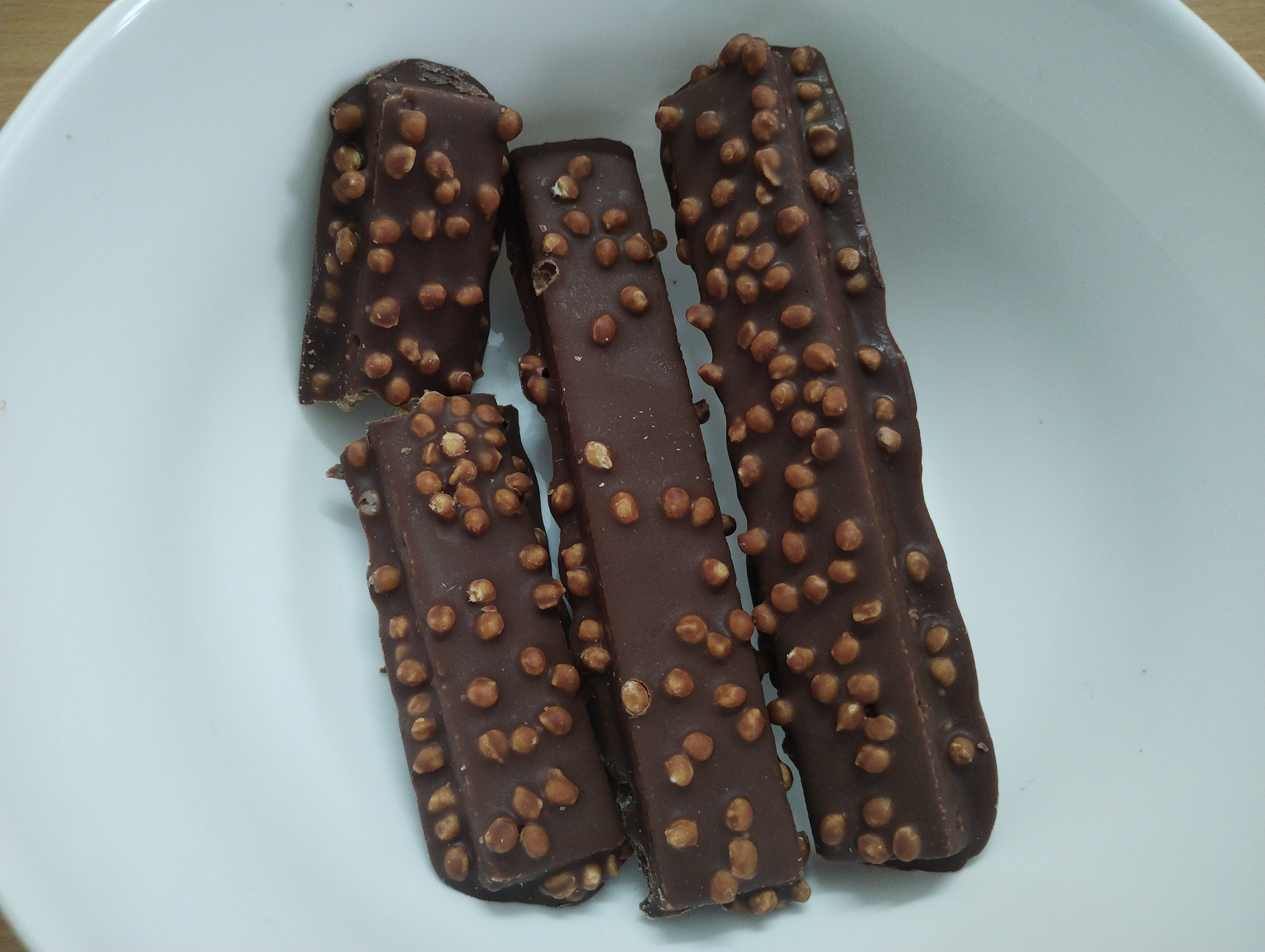
Nestle Munch Butterscotch Max Wafer (2025)

== Variants ==
Munch's variants are Munch Nuts, which includes groundnuts with wafers and Munch Crunch O'Nuts, which includes peanuts.

== Slogan ==
The slogan for the Munch is "NESTLÉ MUNCH Khao, apne Manch pe aao!"
