= Big Turk =

Brand of chocolate bar by Nestle

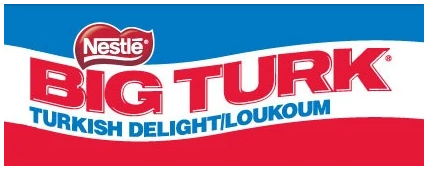
- Product type: Candy bar
- Current owner: Nestlé
- Country: Canada
- Website: nestle.com.ca/bigturk

Big Turk is a candy bar manufactured by Nestlé in Canada, that consists of dark magenta Turkish delight coated with chocolate.

== Overview ==
It is typically found in a red, white, and blue striped package (blue on top, white in the middle, and red on the bottom). The ingredients in Big Turk bars include sugar, glucose, modified corn starch, cocoa butter, milk ingredients, unsweetened chocolate, black carrot concentrate, soy lecithin, natural flavor, citric acid, salt. Even though peanuts are not an ingredient, it is advised that the bars come in contact with machinery that also processes peanuts.

The 60-gram (2.1 oz) bar contains 4 grams (0.14 oz) of fat, which is advertised as 60% less fat than the average chocolate bar.

The other Canadian candy bar featuring Turkish delight, Jersey Milk Treasures, was discontinued c. 1980, however other imported products, like Fry's Turkish Delight, can be purchased in specialty and import shops.

== See also ==
- List of chocolate bar brands
- Nestlé
