= Animal Bar (chocolate bar) =

Brand of chocolate bar

- Product type: Chocolate bar
- Current owner: Nestlé
- Country: Geneva, Switzerland
- Introduced: 1963; 63 years ago
- Discontinued: 2023; 3 years ago

Animal Bar was a brand of chocolate bar, made by Nestlé.

In November 2023, Nestle announced that they would be withdrawing the Animal Bar from their range after 60 years due to low sales.

== Overview ==
Animal Bar was launched in 1963, in the UK, by Nestlé. Unlike Milkybar it was never made by the Rowntree Mackintosh Confectionery. They were primarily marketed and made for children. Each Animal Bar contained a game printed on the inside of the wrapper, and had two different animals, along with their names; moulded onto the surface of the chocolate. Animal Bars were especially popular during the 1960s and 1970s, thus many adults who were children at that time remember them fondly. They were sold as either a single 19 gram bar or a multipack of four.

The original bars had numerous animal heads molded on them, not just two.

== Animals available ==
The original chocolates and their wrappers featured a whole assortment of animals, including:

- Bear
- Cat
- Dog
- Elephant
- Fox
- Giraffe
- Lion
- Monkey
- Panda
- Rabbit
- Tiger
- Zebra

For many years before the product was discontinued, there were a total of eight animals that featured on chocolate Animal Bars. They were paired together and named as follows:

- Ron Rhino and Bertha Bear
- Fiona Fawn and Leo Lion
- Iggy Iguana and Percy Parrot
- Lucy Leopard and Mickey Monkey (Misspelt 'Micky' on the outer packaging)

== See also ==
- Kinder Surprise
- Kinder Chocolate
- Smarties
- Aero
- Yorkie
