= Drifter (chocolate bar) =

English chocolate bar

- Product type: Chocolate bar
- Produced by: Nestle
- Country: United Kingdom
- Introduced: 1980
- Discontinued: 2018
- Previous owners: Rowntree's

Drifter
- Food energy (per serving): 99 kcal (410 kJ)
Nutritional value
(per serving)
- Protein: 0.8 g
- Fat: 4.2 g
- Carbohydrate: 14.3 g
- Other information: Nutritional information source:

Drifter was a wafer-based chocolate bar. Rowntree's launched Drifter in 1980, consisting of a wafer with caramel layered on top, covered with milk chocolate. Nestlé later produced the bar following their takeover of Rowntree's in 1988.

== About ==
90 million bars were produced each year. Among its advertising slogans, it has been referred to as "the chewy chocolate biscuit that you really have to get your teeth into."

In 2007, Nestlé discontinued Drifter before reintroducing it in May 2008, taking advantage of nostalgia like that for Cadbury's Wispa bar. In October 2018, Drifter, which at the time was being produced at the Nestlé Fawdon factory in Newcastle Upon Tyne, UK, was discontinued by Nestlé due to low consumer demand.

The bar was advertised in the 1990s with a series of TV ads involving people speaking slang or jargon, with the tagline "do you catch my drift?".

=== McFlurry ===
In June 2011, McDonald's introduced a limited edition Drifter McFlurry which was available from 15 June until 26 July 2011.

== See also ==
- List of chocolate bar brands
