= Mary Duncan (writer) =

American writer, publisher, and educator (born 1941)

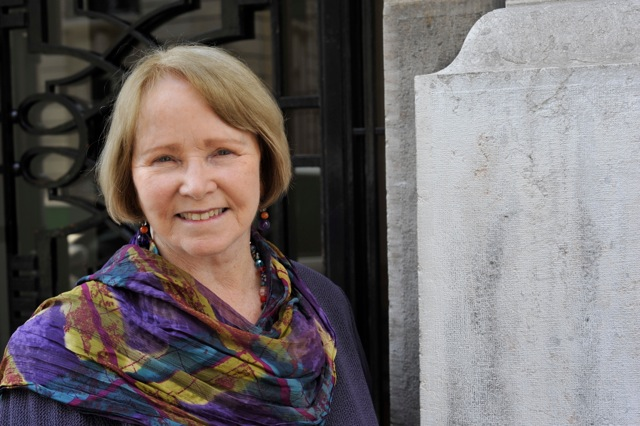
Mary R. Duncan

Mary R. Duncan (born April 16, 1941) is an American writer, publisher and educator. She is the founder of the Paris Writers Group and publisher of the Paris Writers Press.

== Early life and education ==
Duncan was born and raised in San Diego, California. She received a bachelor's degree in political science and English from San Diego State University in 1963, a master's from San Francisco State University in 1969, and a Ph.D. from United States International University in 1975 in San Diego. Her dissertation, The Effects of Social Conflict on Leisure Patterns in Belfast, Northern Ireland, examined the activities of the Provisional Irish Republican Army and the impact of political violence on children and leisure activities.

== Academic career ==
In 1970, Duncan began her academic career as a professor at San Diego State University in the College of Professional Studies and Fine Arts. Her field research on the effects of political violence on children and leisure activities, conducted in Belfast, Mexico, Nicaragua and Cuba, was published in several academic journals, and was reported in articles in the San Diego Union-Tribune, the Moscow Times, and San Diego Magazine. She lectured on this topic at Oxford University and the Smithsonian Institution.

== Moscow bookstore ==
In 1996 she became co-owner Shakespeare and Company Bookstore in Moscow. However, the bookstore was forced to close in 2003 over differences with the Russian government.

== Writing and publishing ==
In 2008 Duncan published her first book, Henry Miller is Under My Bed: People and Places on the Way to Paris. A second edition was published by the Paris Writers Press in 2011.

In 2008 she founded the Paris Writers Group, an association of published authors living in Paris. In 2011 she began the Paris Writers Press, which publishes books related to France. The Paris Writers Press received a CNL Translation Award from the French Ministry of Culture for the English translation of Sade's Publisher: A Memoir by Jean-Jacques Pauvert, the translator of the works of the Marquis de Sade and The Story of O. Other authors published by the Paris Writers Press include Hilary Kaiser, David Burke, Bradley Smith, and Marianne Yayane Verbuyt.

She is a regular contributor on French cultural issues to the HuffPost

== Personal ==
Duncan is married and lives in La Jolla, California and Paris.
