= Scorched Peanut Bar =

Australian chocolate bar

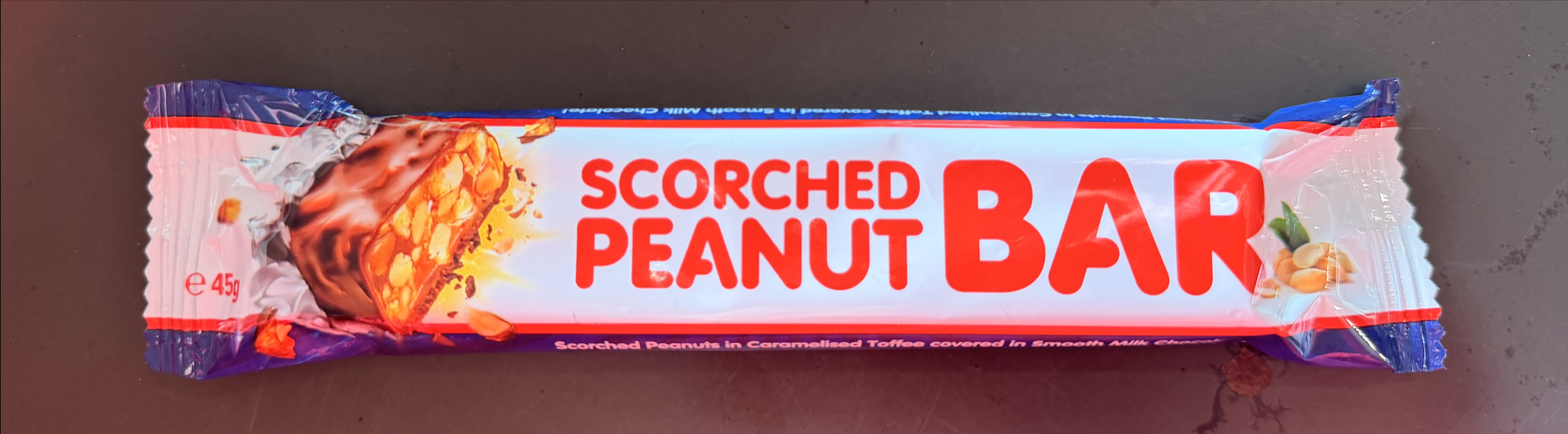

The Scorched Peanut Bar is an Australian chocolate bar that contains peanuts baked in toffee and covered in chocolate. Ownership changed multiple times over the years from when it was first manufactured in 1928, whilst remaining popular it was discontinued in the early 2000s, though successfully reintroduced the market in 2019.

== History ==
In 1935 the representative of White Signet for the territory of Taree NSW went to schools throughout the area, and gave away 2000 bars to school children. Because of this, Taree grocery stores were awarded with a certificate stating "this is to certify that Taree purchased more White Signet Scorched Peanut Bars than any other country town in N.S.W. during the three months ended September, 1935".

Scorched Peanut Bars were first manufactured in 1928 by White Signet, which later in 1954 became Mastercraft Chocolate Co. The bar became one of Mastercraft's best-known products and was widely distributed throughout Australia. In 1960, Mastercraft Chocolate Co. was acquired by Life Savers Australia, increasing the product's national availability.

Ownership transferred to Nestlé following its acquisition of Life Savers Australia in the early 1990s. Although the Scorched Peanut Bar remained a popular confectionary product, it was discontinued by them in the early 2000s.

In November 2019, Cooks Confectionary announced it had acquired the brand and reintroduced the Scorched Peanut Bar to the Australian market via their dedicated Facebook page. The company stated that the relaunch retained the original recipe while expanding the range to include bite-sized products and seasonal Easter items.

== Description ==
The Scorched Peanut Bar consists of whole roasted peanuts surrounded by caramelised toffee and coated in milk chocolate. Since its reintroduction in 2019, the product has also been marketed in additional formats, including Scorched Peanut Bites and seasonal Easter confectionery.

== Marketing ==
In 1940, White Signet "Mastercraft" Chocolates were selling Scorched Peanut Bars for 3 pence, and advertised it as "made carefully to keep CRISP!".

The product was promoted as "Scorched Peanut Bar, the hard bar" in the 1980s and was advertised using sexually suggestive and masculine imagery. One television commercial during this time involved a lumberjack felling a tree, then straddling it and unsheathing a Scorched Peanut Bar on his thigh. A female companion arrives and places her hand on the tree he is straddling, and his thigh. By 1990, the bar had reached top 5 in national sales in Australia.

In 2021, Cooks Confectionery newly manufactured a 250g tub of Scorched Peanut Bites for discount retailer The Reject Shop.
