= Vice Versas =

Chocolate produced by Nestle

Vice Versas are a type of chocolate produced in the UK by Nestlé, similar in composition to Galaxy Minstrels. A Vice Versa can exist in one of two varieties; one consisting of milk chocolate encased in a white coloured sugar coating; the other of white chocolate in a brown coating.

== History ==
Vice Versas were first produced in the UK in 1991, but production was later discontinued. The chocolate sweet was re-launched in 2004, only to be withdrawn once more, roughly a year later. Nestlé offered the following explanatory statement on their website following the second discontinuation of Vice Versa production:

"We are sorry to inform you that the products have been withdrawn from our range due to the high cost of production and the relatively low level of sales. We would like to assure you that the decision to withdraw any product is reached only with great reluctance and we regret any disappointment this product's absence has caused you."

== 2012 relaunch ==
There exists a cult following for Vice Versas, and an online petition was drawn up following the second discontinuation of sale. In 2012, citing numerous fan pages and almost 10,000 requests for the product's return on Facebook, Nestlé relaunched Vice Versas in the UK. However, they are now once again discontinued.
