= Maestrani =

Swiss chocolate company

Maestrani Schweizer Schokoladen AG
- Company type: Joint-stock company
- Industry: Food
- Founded: 1852
- Founder: Aquilino Maestrani
- Headquarters: Flawil, St. Gallen, Switzerland
- Key people: Christoph Birchler (CEO)
- Website: maestrani.ch/en

Maestrani is a Swiss chocolate producer based in Flawil (St. Gallen). It was founded in 1852 in Lucerne by Aquilino Maestrani (1814–1880), a Ticinese chocolatier from Aquila. The company became prosperous after it was moved to St. Gallen in 1859. The company also owns two other chocolate brands: Minor and Munz.

== History ==
Ludovico "Aquilino" Maestrani came from Aquila in the Blenio Valley. He had learned the art of chocolate making from his father Giusepe in Lugano. After travelling throughout Italy and Germany from 1846-1852, he opened his first shop on Krongasse in Lucerne in 1852. in 1859 Maestrani moved his business to Multergasse in St. Gallen and to advertise his products, he bult the so-called "marble house" in the middle of the old town.

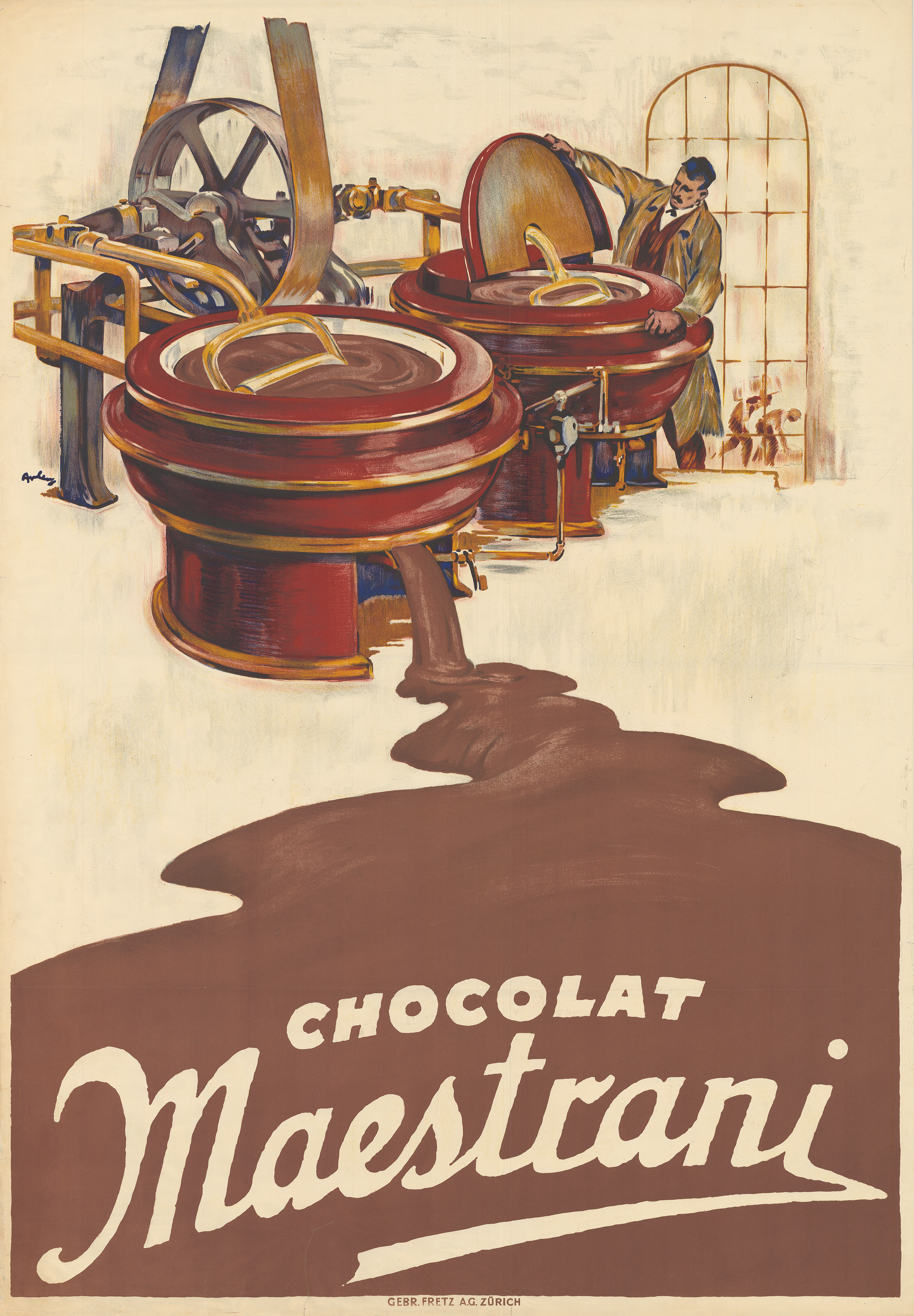
Advertisement, 1924

In 1875 the existing production capacities could not keep up with the demand and a new factory building was built east of the city. In 1880, Aquilino Maestrani died. He was first buried in St. Gallen and later move to Aquila. His three sons Ludovico, Roberto and Savino continued to run the company together. In 1884, the company acquired the building of a former spinning mill in the St. Georgen neighbourhood of St. Gallen, to which production was relocated a year later. The St. Georgen location remained the company's headquarters into the 21st century. From 1887 to 1897 they had a branch in Bregenz. In 1905 the company borrowed extensive amounts of funding and the Maestrani family eventually lost control of the company in the years 1912-1913. The troubled "Maestrani Schweizer Schokoladen AG" was successfully restructured in 1923 by the creditors' trustee Jakob Guyer.

The Maestrani company was widely known early on, the Italian king Umberto I appointed it his purveyor to the court. In 1912, the company was given its current name "Maestrani Schweizer Schokoladen AG". The company went through hard times in the years of the world wars, especially because of the scarcity of raw materials.

In 1987, Maestrani became the first chocolate company in the world to begin producing organic chocolate.

In 1998, Maestrani acquired its competitor, Munz located in Flawil. Munz was founded there in 1874 by Johann Georg Munz. A year later, construction began on a new factory building with the intention of relocating the entire production from St. Gallen to Flawil. This took place in 2003 and 2004. One year after the planned final relocation of the traditional company from St. Gallen, a new retail outlet called the "Chocolaterie" was opened near the St. Gallen Cathedral. There, chocolate is sold, and visitors can learn about its production through the chocolate-making machines located in the shop. The "Chocolaterie" was sold after the closure of the factory in St. Gallen and changed hands again in 2016. In 2017, Maestrani opened the "Chocolarium" chocolate museum in Flawil. Among other things, it offers an interactive tour and insights into the production process.

Maestrani produces various 100 g chocolate bars. It also produces the Minor bars, which are rectangular praline bars, and the Munz bars, which are various filled chocolate bars, among which is the "Munz Banana", a dark chocolate bar with banana-flavored filling.

Maestrani is a member of IG Bio. As of 2020, 165 people work in Flawil. The production volume is said to be around 3,500 tons per year. Since the beginning of 2021, Christoph Birchler has been CEO of the company; he succeeded Markus Vettiger, who retired.

In January 2022, Maestrani entered into a cooperation agreement with the Swiss company Farvager and founded Avelines Chocolats SA. In April 2025, it was initially announced that the acquisition of Chocolat Ammann AG from Heimberg was being considered, the acquisition became effective in August 2025. Production was to be relocated to Flawil and the Heimberg site closed, resulting in the dismissal of the entire workforce at the Heimberg site, equivalent to 18.4 full-time positions. In June of the same year, Maestrani acquired the Belgian chocolate manufacturer Delafaille, along with its subsidiary Ostrapack, through a succession arrangement.

Maestrani is a member of the IG Bio (Organic Interest Group).

The chocolate factory in Flawil includes a visitor center and a museum, named Maestrani's Chocolarium. It was inaugurated in 2017.

== Brands ==
Maestrani sells its chocolate under its own name. The "Minor" brand, founded in 1936, was added later. After the takeover of Munz, the three brands Maestrani, Minor and Munz were produced. In 2021, the Munz chocolate bars were rebranded with the name Maestrani and switched to a two-brand strategy. At the same time, the chocolates have been sold abroad exclusively under the Maestrani name since 2008, since a brand like "Minor" (English "unimportant") or "Munz" can hardly be marketed in the Anglophone or Francophone world.

== Products ==
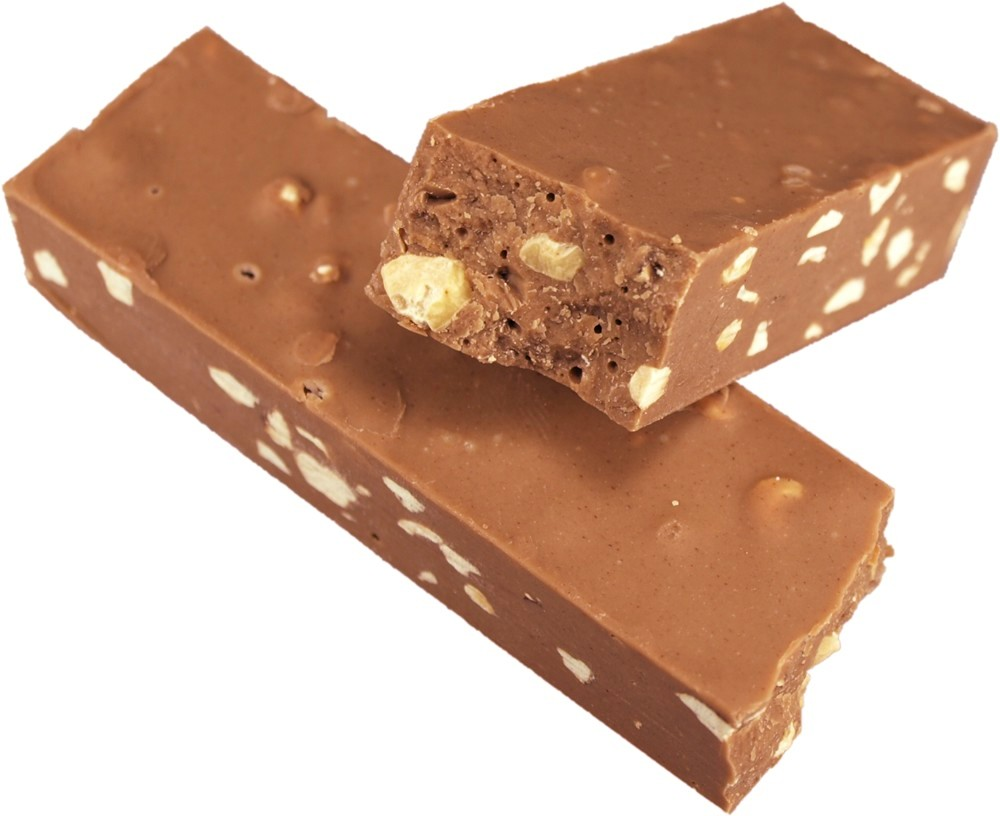
Minor chocolate stick in its distinct square form

- Square (Minor) and round (Munz) chocolate sticks
- Fair trade organic chocolate bars (formerly Maestrani, since 2021 Munz)
- Kosher chocolate
- Chocolate bananas (Munz)
- Ladybugs, chocolate mice (Munz)
- Munzli (mini praline with chocolate coating)
- Caramel (Munz)
- Jelly (Munz)

== Trivia ==
- The Maestrani lettering is often the first thing tourists see when they arrive in St. Gallen by train, since a large neon sign hangs over the eastern end of the St. Gallen railway station.

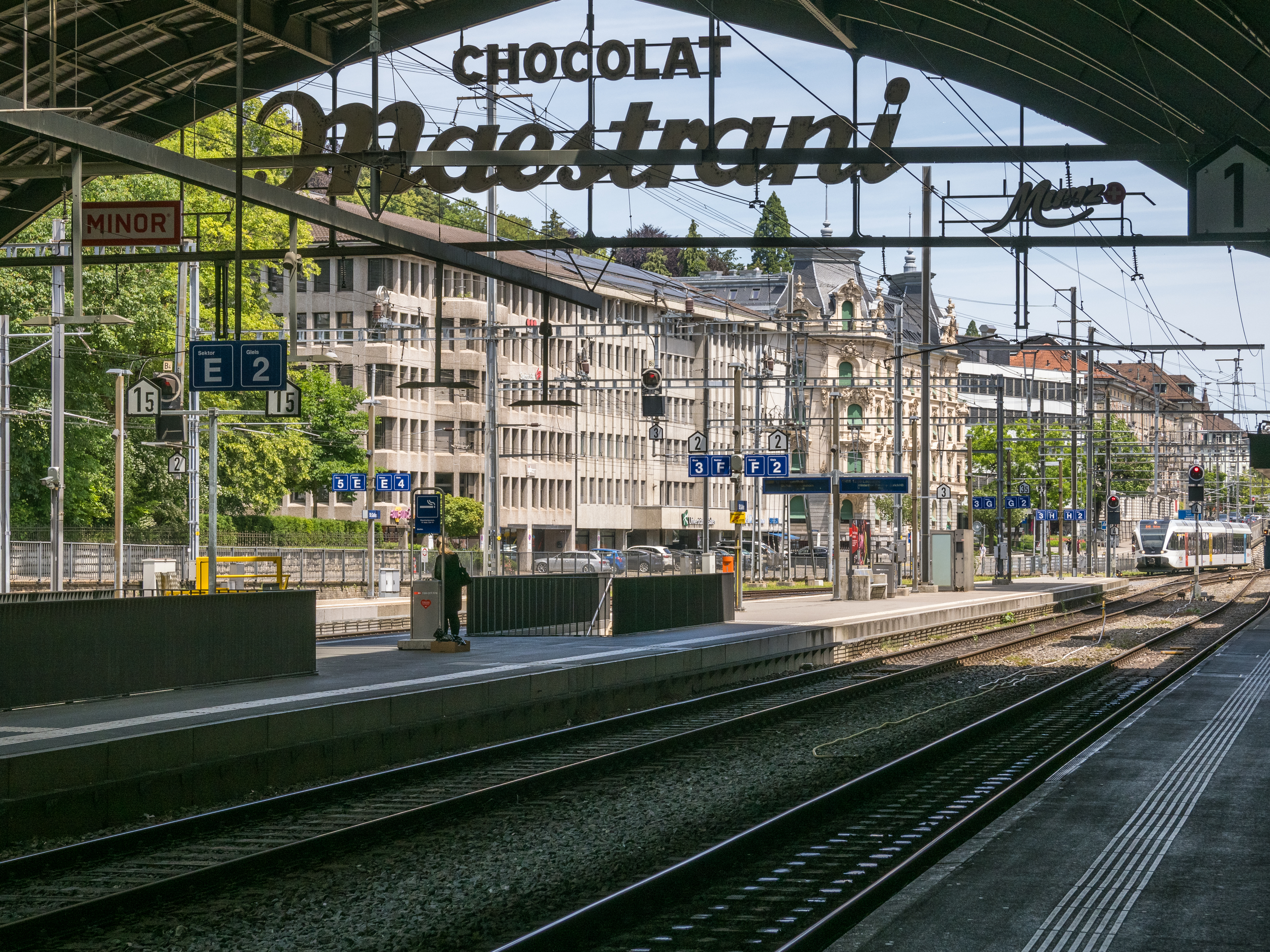
Advertising at St. Gallen CS

- An advertisement for the company hung above the entrance to Hall 7 of the OLMA until shortly before it caught fire, which recently caused some discussion. The advertisements depicted black people in a way that could hint at the glorification of slavery and exploitation.
- A machine for issuing "Minor-Prügeli" was inaugurated in Davos in 2016 to encourage customers to use ATMs.
- The company area received a "Certificate for Nature-Oriented Environmental Design" from the Foundation "Natur & Wirtschaft" in 2021.
- The company has been awarded the label "climate neutral" by the non-profit foundation Myclimate. This means that the emissions caused by the production were offset by climate protection projects.

== See also ==
- Swiss chocolate
