= Princessa (chocolate bar) =

Polish chocolate bar

- Type: Chocolate bar
- Place of origin: Poznań, Greater Poland, Poland
- Created by: Goplana S.A.
- Main ingredients: Wafer, chocolate
- Variations: Chocolate, milk, coconut etc.
- Food energy (per serving): 175 (32g serving)
Nutritional value
(per serving)
- Protein: 2.2 g
- Fat: 10.4 g
- Carbohydrate: 18.2 g
- Other information: 0mg of sodium

Princessa is a Polish chocolate bar manufactured by Nestlé, consisting of a chocolate-covered wafer bar with four layers of wafer, and three layers of filling. They are similar to the longer-established rival product Prince Polo, and have been released in several different varieties over the years.

== History ==
The Princessa brand was first introduced by the company Goplana S.A., which is based in Poznań, Greater Poland. In 1994 Goplana, Poland's largest chocolate company at the time, was acquired by Nestlé with the aim of introducing the Nestlé brand to the Polish market. In 2004, Nestlé sold Goplana to the company Jutrzenka Holding S.A. (now Colian Holding S.A.), leaving Nestlé with the rights to manufacture products under the Princessa brand.

== Varieties ==
Nestlé produces the Princessa chocolate bar in many varieties, including:

- Princessa Mleczna
- Princessa Klasyczna
- Princessa Arachidowa
- Princessa Zebra
- Princessa Orzechowa
- Princessa Kokosowa
- Princessa Kokosowa Biała
- Princessa Czekoladowa
- Princessa Muśnięta Czekoladą
- Princessa Intensywny Smak Brownie

Special editions include:

- Princessa Gold
- Princessa Bananowym Milkshake
- Princessa Truskawkowa Milkshake
- Princessa Intense Peanut Butter
- Princessa Intense White Coconut
- Princessa Intense Dark Coconut
- Princessa Dark Orange
- Princessa Dark Cherry
- Princessa White Raspberry
- Princessa White Lemon
- Princessa Salty Caramel (Planeta Singli Edition)

The chocolate bars are also available in maxi/longa varieties, which are longer versions of the bar, chrupka varieties, which contain more wafer and less chocolate, and vitale varieties which are coated in a light layer of grains.

Also available under the Princessa brand is Princessa ice cream and Princessa waffles.

== See also ==
- List of Polish desserts
