= Kägi Söhne =

Swiss confectionery company

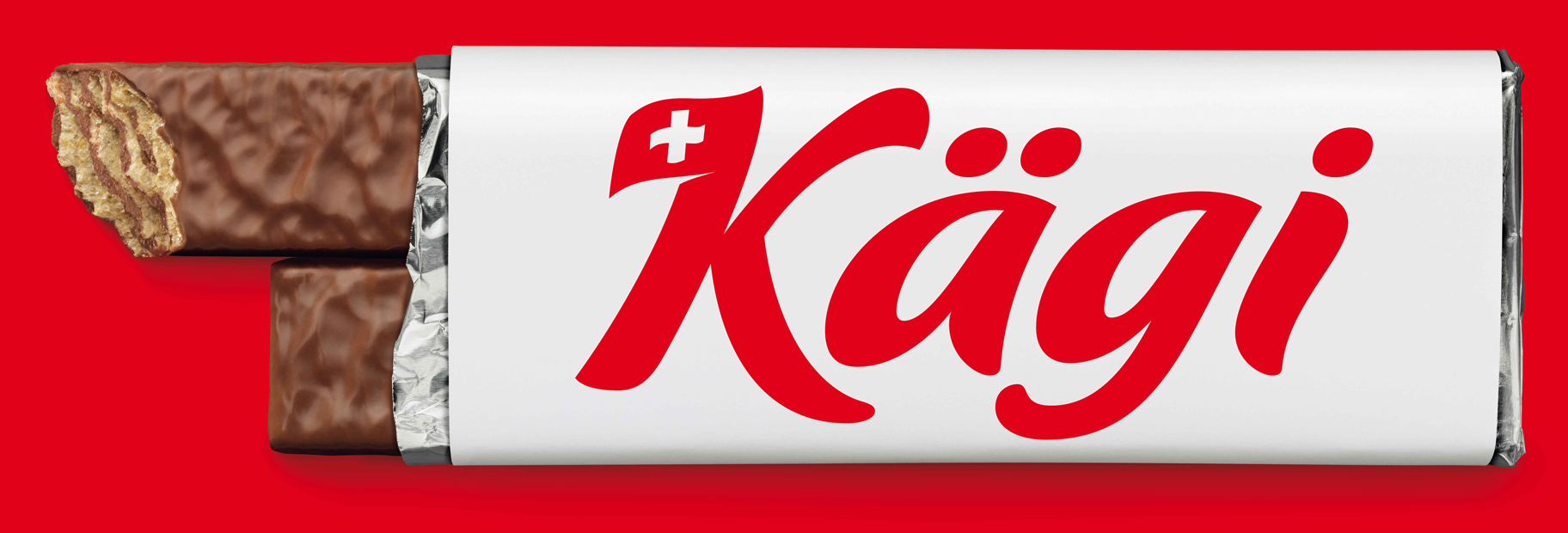
- Founded: 1942
- Founder: Otto Kägi
- Headquarters: Toggenburg
- Products: Confectionery
- Brands: Kägi fret; Kägi Toggenburger

Kägi Söhne AG (from German, lit. "Kägi Sons") is a Swiss confectioner and chocolate producer based in Lichtensteig (St. Gallen). The chocolate-covered wafer specialty Kägi fret from the eastern region of Switzerland, Toggenburg, is available in various flavours and is manufactured by Kägi Söhne AG, Toggenburgerwaffeln- & Biscuitfabrik.

== History ==
The company was founded in 1934 as a bakery by Otto Kägi Sr. (1890-1965) in the "Zum Hecht" inn and pastry shop in Lichtensteig where he primarily produced pastries for restaurants and direct sales. He used his bike to deliver to customers and advertise his products.

The start of waffle production in the 1940s resulted in the gradual expansion of the company and the switch from manual to machine operation.

In 1950, Kägi acquired a larger factory building to meet growing demand. The following year, Kägi became an open trading company, with the three Kägi sons Otto Jr., Eugen and Alfred at the helm. In 1952, Kägi started coating his wafers with chocolate. Production has taken place since 1954 in a new building in Lichtensteig at the current location. In 1956, wafers were exported abroad for the first time. Since 1958, the year the product Kägi fret was launched, a significant part of the turnover has been attributable to exports.

In 1960, he started his production of chocolate from raw cocoa beans. After he died in 1965, the sons of Otto Kägi took over the company.

In 1950, the number of employees was ten, in 1960 there were 120 (excluding seasonal workers). The company was family-owned until 1996. It was then sold to the consumer goods group and kiosk operator Valora. Five years later the company was expanded. In 2008, Kägi was transferred to the investment company Argos Soditic. In 2010, the company was sold to the Swiss investment company WM15 Holding, which is part of Burger Söhne Holding. As of 2021, the company has 140 employees, and the total number of all product variations was put at 300. The company is located in the Toggenburg region, where the Churfirsten range is found, used as the corporate logo.

=== Development of the products ===
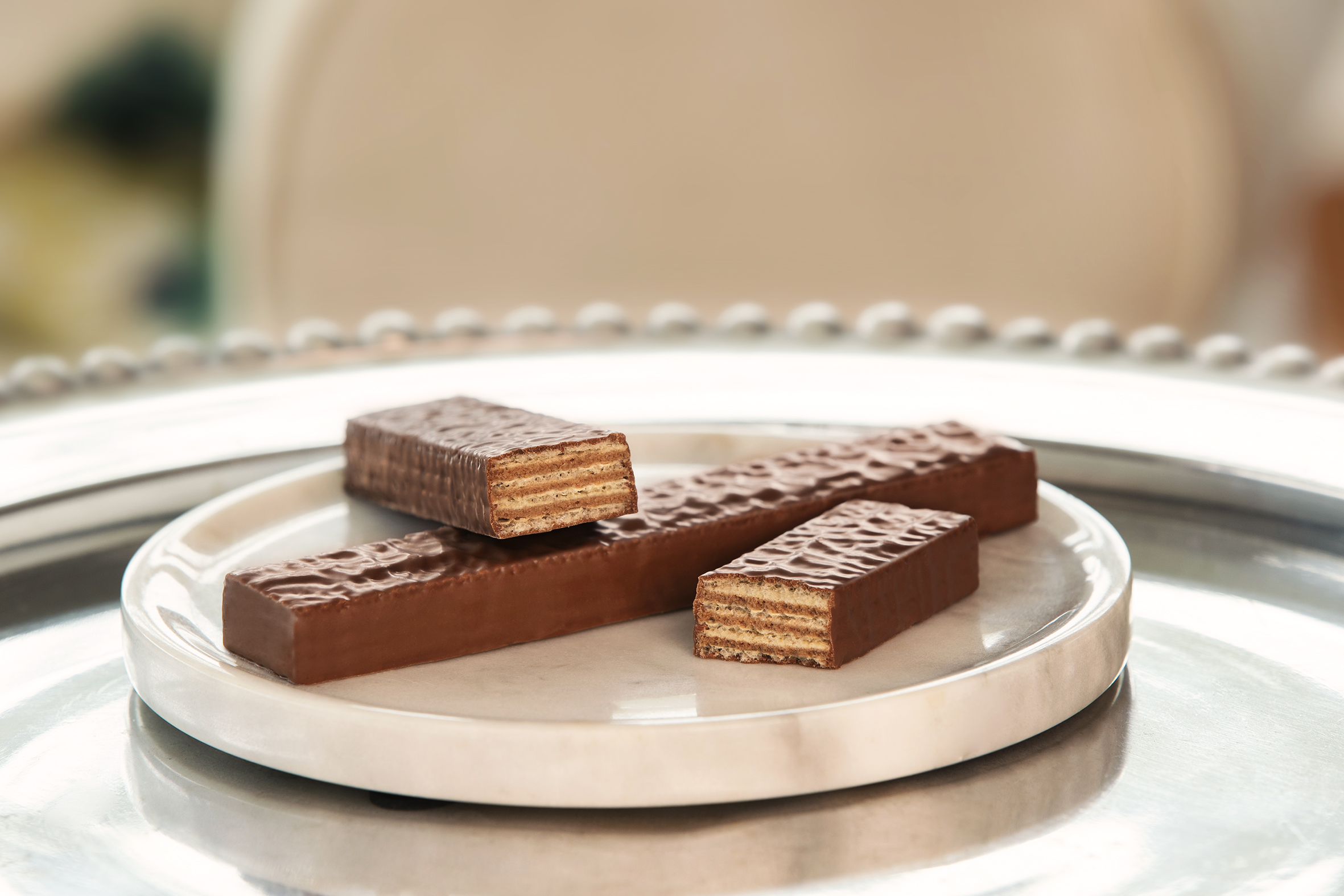
One of the company's iconic products is the Kägi fret bar which has been produced in its current form since 1958

In 1942, Otto Kägi Sr. started producing and selling waffles. From 1952, wafers were marketed in a chocolate coating. The main speciality of Kägi Söhne is the Kägi fret (using the shortened French word for wafer: "gaufrette"). The company has been producing the chocolate itself since 1960 and uses large agitators for the refinement, so-called longitudinal conches. Initially, the Kägi fret consisted of a single, very wide chocolate wafer, then later as a twin chocolate coated wafer bar, wrapped in aluminium foil. It has been produced since 1958 (in its current form) and is today one of the most iconic chocolate bars produced in Switzerland. The Kägi Toggenburger, which are fresh butter biscuits, are the other speciality of the company.

=== Export and name variants ===
In 1956, overseas exports began with a shipment to the United States. For a long time, the foreign share of sales remained rather modest, then gradually changed. Important export regions and countries became Germany and Austria, the Middle East, China and Japan. In 2018, Kägi Söhne AG generated around half of its revenues abroad. At the beginning of 2022, Kägi products were delivered to more than 30 countries.

In German-speaking countries, the name "Kägi fret" was retained, while the product was initially marketed internationally as "Toggi", and then as "Kägi" since 2013 (status: 2022).

== Products and flavours ==
"The recipe (...) has remained practically unchanged since the beginning": The wafer bars consist of four wafer sheets, connected by three layers of cream filling, all covered with milk chocolate. A special process using air jets creates the wavy structure in the chocolate coating.

In addition to the classic version, there are other flavours, such as dark chocolate, hazelnut, orange or coconut. The products are also offered in different sizes and for different purposes (snacks on the go, as gifts, etc.). There is also a praline variant.

== Trivia ==
- Kägi fret meets the requirements of the Swissness regulation, which is why the Swiss cross can be printed on the packaging.
- In a survey on trust in Swiss brands, Kägi fret ranked 7th in 2020.
- Kägi fret's Facebook page was voted the most popular Swiss Facebook page in 2014.
- The "Kägi-Fret Bahn" runs from Alt St. Johann to the "Alp Sellamatt" between the Alpstein and Churfirsten.
- Kägi fret appears several times in novels and stories, for example in "Groschens Grab" by Franzobel, in "Solothurn trägt Schwarz" and "Solothurn streut Asche" by Christof Gasser or in "Saubere Wäsche: Johanna di Napolis erster Fall» by Michael Herzig.
- Marilyn Monroe was considered a fan of Kägi fret.

== See also ==
- Swiss chocolate
- List of bean-to-bar chocolate manufacturers
