= Nestlé Milk Chocolate =

Chocolate bar

- Product type: Chocolate bar
- Current owner: Nestlé
- Country: Switzerland
- Introduced: 1880
- Discontinued: 2016; 10 years ago

Nestlé Milk Chocolate was a chocolate bar consisting of milk chocolate, produced by Nestlé. Nestlé Milk Chocolate was sold in many countries around the world. The bar was discontinued in 2016. The original formula was invented by company founder Henri Nestlé in 1875.

== Background ==
Nestlé Milk Chocolate was created as a competitor to the more-established, and North American chocolate bar segment-leader Hershey bar, and was even created in a similar form as their competitor. The closest Nestlé product to them is the Nestlé Crunch, which is very similar to Nestlé Milk Chocolate, the main difference being that Nestlé Crunch has puffed rice, while Nestlé Milk Chocolate does not. A similar product, Yorkie made by Nestlé, is not to be confused with Nestlé Milk Chocolate as it is a completely different product, as the Yorkie bar was originally created by British firm Rowntree of York to compete with Cadbury Dairy Milk.

Nestlé also produces many other brands of chocolate/syrup.

== Distribution ==
Nestlé Milk Chocolate bars were available in 1.45-oz (41.1-g) bars, as well as in boxes of 24.
