= Rally (candy bar) =

Candy bar

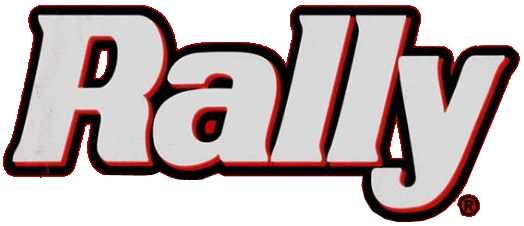
- Product type: Candy bar
- Current owner: The Hershey Company
- Country: United States
- Introduced: 1970s

Rally is a candy bar manufactured by The Hershey Company. Although no exact release date is known, the bar was introduced sometime in the 1970s. It has been discontinued and brought back to store shelves on numerous occasions.

The bar is chocolate-covered with a nougat center, a coating of caramel, and rolled in peanuts.

== History ==
It is said the Rally candy bar was inspired by the record breaking 13th International trailer rally of The Wally Byam Caravan Club held at Hershey, PA in 1970. 10,000 persons in 3,402 Airstream travel trailers gathered for the event.

To commemorate the event The Hershey Company produced a limited production candy bar called "Rally." The bar was popular enough that Hershey decided to keep it in production. In subsequent years, it has been discontinued and also brought back to store shelves on numerous occasions.

== Nutrition information ==
Rally Bar
Nutritional value per 100 g (3.5 oz)
- Carbohydrates: 27 g
- Sugars: 24 g
- Fat: 13 g
- Saturated: 5 g
- Trans: 0 g
- Protein: 4 g
Vitamins and minerals
Minerals	Quantity %DV^{†}
Iron	11% 2 mg
Sodium	2% 45 mg
- Other constituents: Quantity
- Cholesterol: 0 mg
- Serving size 1 candy bar
- ^{†}Percentages estimated using US recommendations for adults.
