= W & M Duncan and Company =

Scottish confectionery company

W & M Duncan and Company, best known as "Duncan's of Edinburgh", was a Scottish confectioner. The company's most popular and enduring product was the Walnut Whip, which is now manufactured by Nestlé Rowntree's.

== History ==
Mary Duncan, along with her eldest son William, founded a cake business in Dundee in 1861. In 1884 the company moved to 205 High Street, Edinburgh, and began to manufacture chocolate confectionery. In 1896 it moved to the Regent Confectionery Works in Beaverhall Road, Edinburgh. Ingredients were stored at Wishart's Warehouse, a former ship chandlery in Leith (later renamed as Shore Place and now converted to flats).

He opened a retail shop at 86 Leith Street(at the east end of Princes Street) around 1900 and was then living in a flat at 20 Eyre Crescent.

The Walnut Whip was launched in 1910. By 1916 the Beaverhall factory was six times its original size and business was flourishing.

The business was acquired by Rowntree in 1927 but retained the Duncan's brand name. In 1967 the Edinburgh factory was closed to all items and concentrated solely on the Walnut Whip.

Rowntree closed the factory in 1987 but it was reopened immediately, through a management buy-out, trading as "Duncans of Scotland" revitalising the dormant name. In 1991 it was purchased by Jeremy Salvesen. He moved the new Duncans business moved to Bellshill, Lanarkshire.

In 1991, Duncan's won a Ministry of Defence contract to supply chocolate bars for military ration packs. Duncan's provided over 4 million 60g chocolate bars to the forces from 1991 until 2003.

In 1991 Duncan's supplied two flavours of their bars to the MoD, a Raisin and Cereal Chocolate bar with a maroon wrapper and a plain milk bar with a blue wrapper. The milk bar had the Duncan's "Of Edinburgh" logo on it instead of the newly standard "Of Scotland" In 1992 with the new GP ration pack that had swapped from cans to pouches, there was a significant increase in the amount of Duncan's being supplied, with all menus containing at least one Duncan's bar.

In 1993 and 1994 more Duncan's were being supplied to the MoD to build up ration stocks after the Gulf War: eight flavours were supplied. Six of these were: Rum and Raisin, Raisin and Cereal, Plain Milk, Milk Chocolate With Mint, Mint Crisp, Milk Chocolate With Orange

In 1995 a special "Milk chocolate, with milk" bar was put into 10 man rations, but that is the only time it has been found. Then in 1997 with the ration packs being made more mass-produce-able and for cost reasons, Rum and Raisin was removed in June 1997 as were many other flavours leaving only the plain milk and raisin and cereal.

In 2000, the plain milks wrapper changed from blue to red to which it remained until 2003.

Duncan's of Scotland had passed through several owners before becoming part of J. E. Wilson & Sons (Kendal).

Between 2008 and 2014 small production runs of flavours like Ginger and Toffee were made and sold in gift shops and wholesale to some independent store at home and overseas.

Duncan's as a company went into liquidation in February 2003 and no longer exists. It was passed around many companies until in September 2020, its parent company was dissolved.
