= Friesinger's Candies =

American confectionery company

Friesinger's Candy is an Ohio based confectionery company. Subsidiaries include Riverdale Fine Foods, Candy Farm, Minute Fudge, Yuletide and Dayton Nut and Candy based in Dayton, Ohio. The companies makes products including the historic coconut bar, also known as a Neapolitan three color coconut bar. The packaging says the strawberry, vanilla and chocolate coconut candy bar dates to 1894.

== See also ==
- Neapolitan ice cream
