= Starbar =

Trademark

- Product type: Confectionery
- Introduced: 1976
- Related brands: List of Cadbury products
- Markets: Worldwide
- Tagline: "...next time you're having an energy crisis" (1970s) "the munchiest bar ever" (1970s–1990s)
- Website: https://www.cadbury.co.uk/products/cadbury-starbar-11308

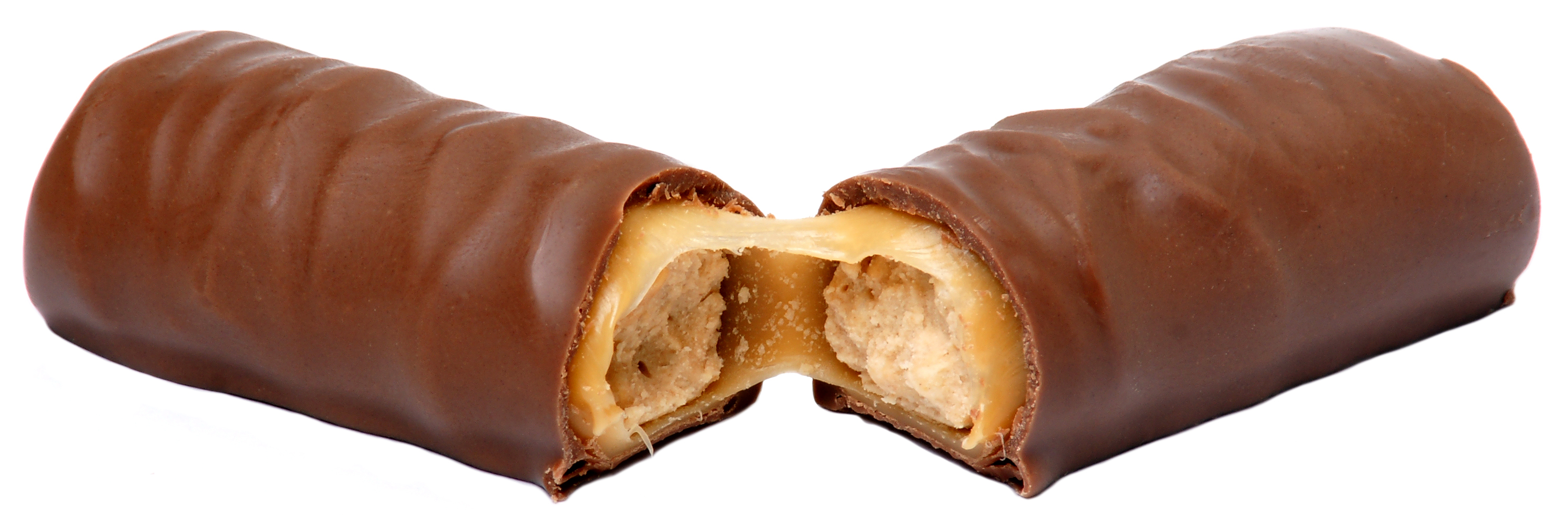
A Starbar split in half

Starbar is a brand of chocolate bar manufactured by Cadbury. The bar has chocolate covering and is filled with caramel and crushed roasted peanuts. The product is sold in the United Kingdom, and also in Canada and Germany under the name Wunderbar.

== History ==
The Star Bar was launched in 1976. It was accompanied by a space-themed TV advert by Richard Williams Animation Studio, London with the tagline "...next time you're having an energy crisis". The bar was later promoted as "the munchiest bar ever". It was also promoted in the UK in the mid-1980s with a postal offer (3 wrappers plus P+P could be turned in for a Starbar Ruler, Pencil and a copy of Douglas Adams' The Restaurant at the End of the Universe).

In 1989, it briefly became a peanut version of the Boost, only to return to Starbar (now written as one word) in 1994.

Canadian and German version of the Starbar, branded "Wunderbar" in a package of mini bite-size pieces

In Canada and Germany, Wunderbar is a Cadbury Adams product marketed under the license of Cadbury UK Limited. It is also available in a package of "minis" and in a 12 g (½ oz) size for Halloween.

Since January 2012, Starbars have been available in the Nordic countries, manufactured by Marabou Sweden (owned by Mondelēz International which also owns Cadbury).

Starbar was introduced to Australia in November 2012 (made in Ireland); however, it is no longer available and no longer listed on the Cadbury Australia website.
