= Yorkie (chocolate bar) =

Chocolate bar in the United Kingdom made by Nestlé

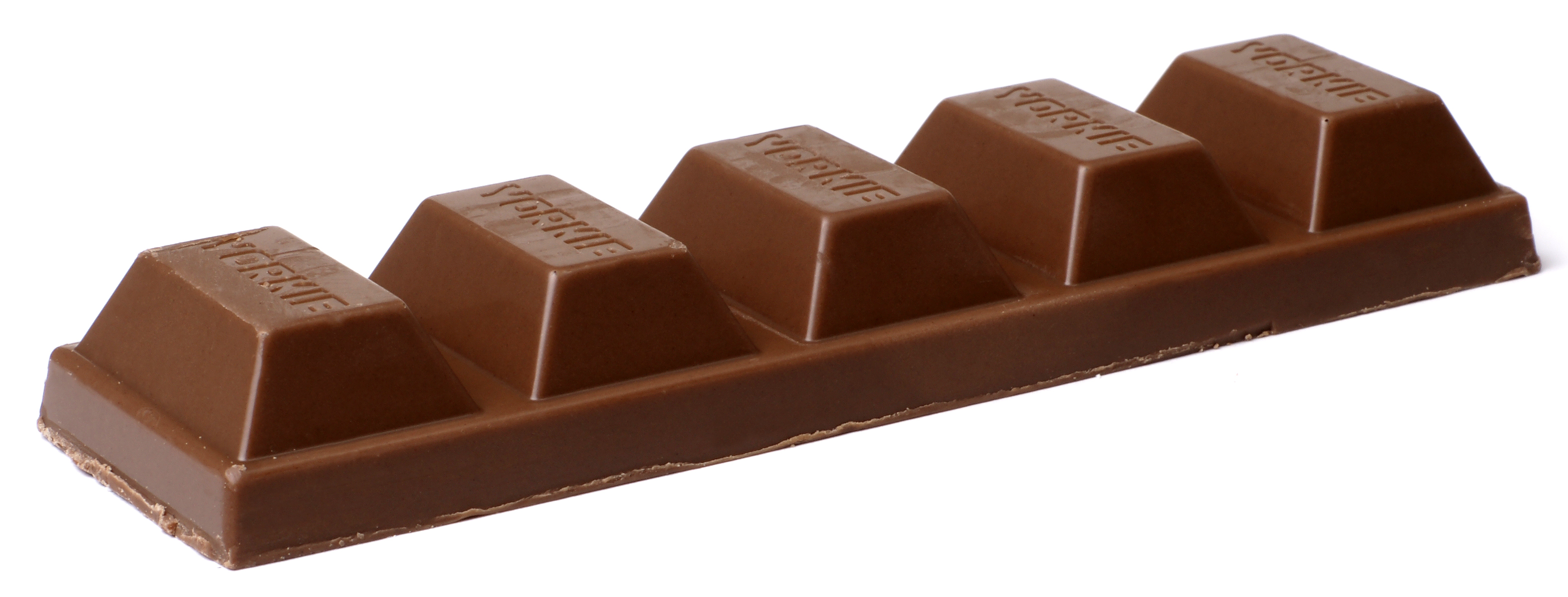
- Product type: Chocolate bar
- Current owner: Nestlé
- Country: United Kingdom
- Introduced: 1976; 50 years ago
- Previous owners: Rowntree's
- Website: nestle.co.uk/yorkie

Yorkie is a chocolate bar made by Nestlé. It was originally made by York-based company Rowntree's, hence the name.

== History ==
In 1976, Eric Nicoli of Rowntree's spotted a gap in the confectionery market for a "manly" chocolate bar, and so the company launched Yorkie as a chunkier competitor to Cadbury's Dairy Milk. Production was at York and Norwich until 1994.

The Yorkie bar has historically been marketed towards men. From the bar's launch until 1992, the "Yorkie bar trucker" was the famous "rough, tough star" of the brand's television adverts. Another prominent ad from this period was a billboard at York railway station with the words "Welcome to" and a picture of a half unwrapped Yorkie bar. Thus the advert read "Welcome to York". Further text beneath said "Where the men are hunky and the chocolate's chunky".

In 2002, the bar's relaunch campaign made this positioning more explicit, with the addition of a wrapper tagline reading "It's not for girls!", as well as associated £3 million television and print advertisements that featured a variety of slogans. One of these campaigns provoked 97 complaints to the Advertising Standards Agency on grounds of sexism in its first year, but the ASA eventually ruled that these complaints were not justified. However, an associated promotional campaign in which free sample bars were handed out exclusively to men was banned by Liverpool's and Birmingham's councils. In 2006, a pink-wrapped special edition was released as an ironic play on the "not for girls" branding, with this edition marketed towards women. In 2011, the "It's Not for Girls!" slogan was dropped, and standard Yorkie bars became available in three packs.

Aside from the original milk chocolate bar, several variants are available, including a "raisin and biscuit" flavour, "honeycomb" flavour, and Yorkie ice cream. A special version for use in Ministry of Defence ration packs was also produced, with its tagline reading "It's not for civvies".

=== Size changes ===
Yorkie bars were originally composed of six chunks of chocolate each marked Rowntree; they were wrapped in both foil and an outer paper wrapper and weighed 100 g (3.5 oz).

The wrapping was later switched to a single plastic foil wrapper. More recently, in an effort to reduce costs, the number of chunks was reduced to five with "Yorkie" moulded into each chunk. The weight of the bar has decreased over the years. In 2002, Yorkie bars were 70 g (2.5 oz). This had been reduced to 64.5 g (2.28 oz) by 2010, and was reduced further to 61 g (2.2 oz) in 2011 and then 55 g (1.9 oz) later that year. It was shrunk again in November 2014 to 46 g (1.6 oz). In January 2015, United Kingdom, Raisin & Biscuit Yorkies were 44 g (1.6 oz). Limited edition Yorkie Peanut was 43 g (1.5 oz). Yorkie King size bars have also reduced in size.

== Flavours ==
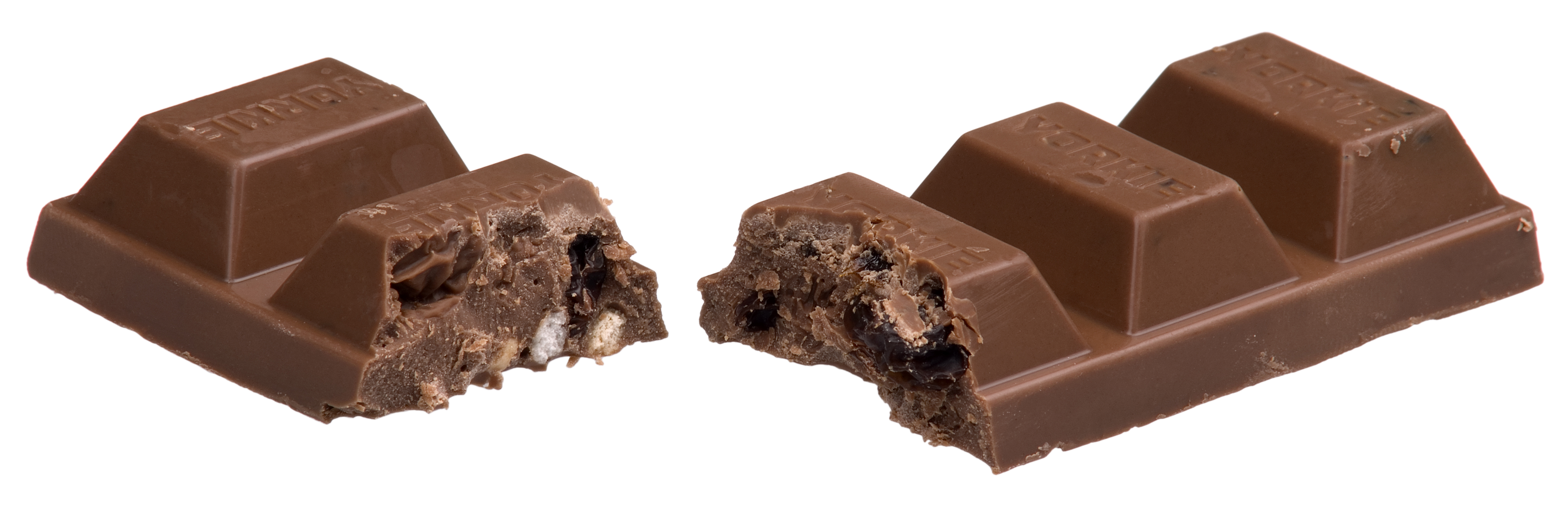
A Raisin & Biscuit Yorkie bar split

- Original (milk chocolate)
- Raisin & Biscuit
- Honeycomb
- Orange ('Limited Edition' launched on 10 May 2021)
- Peanut (discontinued, relaunched as a 'Limited Edition' on 13 October 2014, now discontinued again)
- Almond (discontinued)
- "The Nutter" (mixed nuts – discontinued)
- Yorkie Biscuit and Brownie ('Limited Edition', launched in 2025)
- Yorkie Blue Ice (crunchy mint flavoured chips – discontinued)
- Yorkie Hot Stuff Hot Rum (rum flavour Christmas limited edition)
- Biscuit (biscuit made with Yorkie original chocolate) – discontinued in 2024
- Yorkie Pro (protein chocolate with crispy pieces – protein: 24.7 g per 100 g / 10.5 g per serving)
- Yorkie Salted Caramel Pretzel

== Other information ==
Yorkie sponsored the Stealth roller coaster at Thorpe Park.

== See also ==
- Nestlé Milk Chocolate
- Carlos V (chocolate bar)
- Cadbury Dairy Milk
