= Boost (chocolate bar) =

Brand of chocolate bar

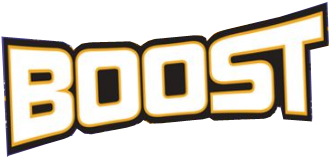

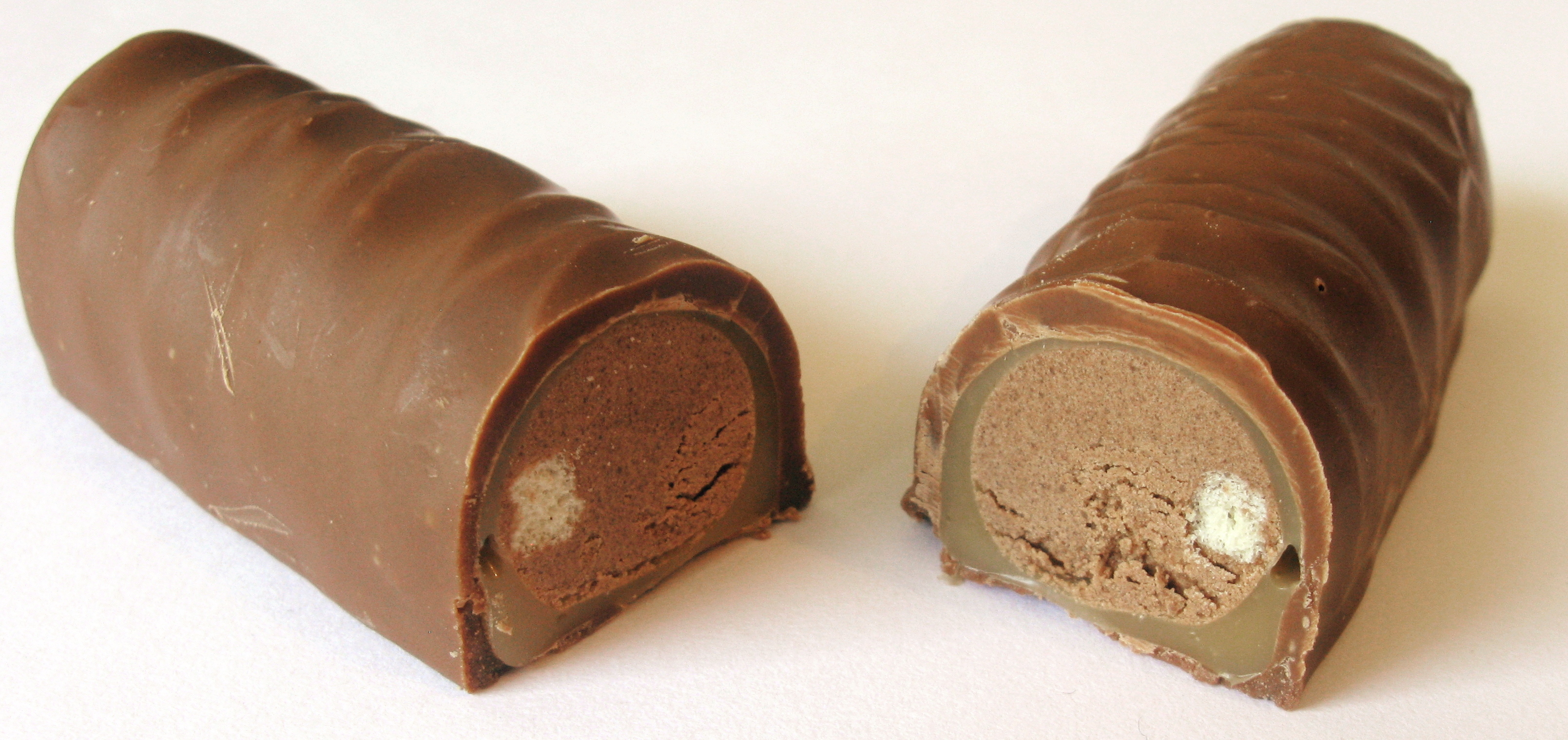
- Product type: Confectionery
- Current owner: Cadbury
- Country: United Kingdom
- Introduced: 1985; 41 years ago
- Related brands: List of Cadbury products
- Website: cadbury.co.uk/boost

Boost, sold as Moro Gold in Australasia, is a brand of chocolate bar manufactured by British company Cadbury. It consists of milk chocolate with a caramel and biscuit filling. The bar is sold in the United Kingdom, Ireland, Australia, New Zealand and South Africa.

== History ==
Boost was introduced in Britain in 1985 as Coconut Boost, a coconut and caramel bar coated in chocolate. In 1989 the peanut and caramel Starbar was rebranded as Peanut Boost. A biscuit and caramel version was also launched. The coconut bar was discontinued in 1994 and the peanut version was again rebranded as Starbar. The biscuit version is now the standard Boost bar.

A number of variants were also made through the years. An energy version, Boost Guarana, was launched in the British market in 2002 along with Boost Glucose. Both were marketed with the slogan "gives you the edge". Boost+ Protein was introduced in 2018 containing caramel, "protein crisps", and less sugar than the standard bar. In 2019 a peanut version of this was also released.

In 2009, the Boost packaging was redesigned and the Boost Duo was also launched: two smaller Boost bars in one wrapper. Cadbury Boost Bites, bitesize bars sold in a 108 grams (3.8 oz) bag, were introduced in August 2015.

Following increased commodity prices and legislation from the British Government, the Boost bar sold in Britain was shrunk from 60 grams (2.1 oz) down to 48.5 grams (1.71 oz) in 2013. In 2014, the Boost Duo version also shrank by 10 grams (0.35 oz) to 68 grams (2.4 oz). The wrapper was notably updated to reflect the new Reference Intakes and use of Palm and Shea fat in the product. The Boost Duo has shrunk yet again to 63 grams (2.2 oz) which is only 3 grams (0.11 oz) more than the original bar from 1985.

== Marketing ==
In the 1990s Boost was advertised on television by comedy duo Reeves and Mortimer with the unconventional advertising slogan "It's slightly rippled with a flat under-side." Cadbury's Boost then went on to sponsor the successful Yamaha team in the British Superbike Championship. It has also been marketed using the slogan "charged with glucose".

== Popularity ==
Boost was the most popular snack among construction workers working on the 2012 London Olympics.
