= Crunch (chocolate bar) =

Chocolate bar

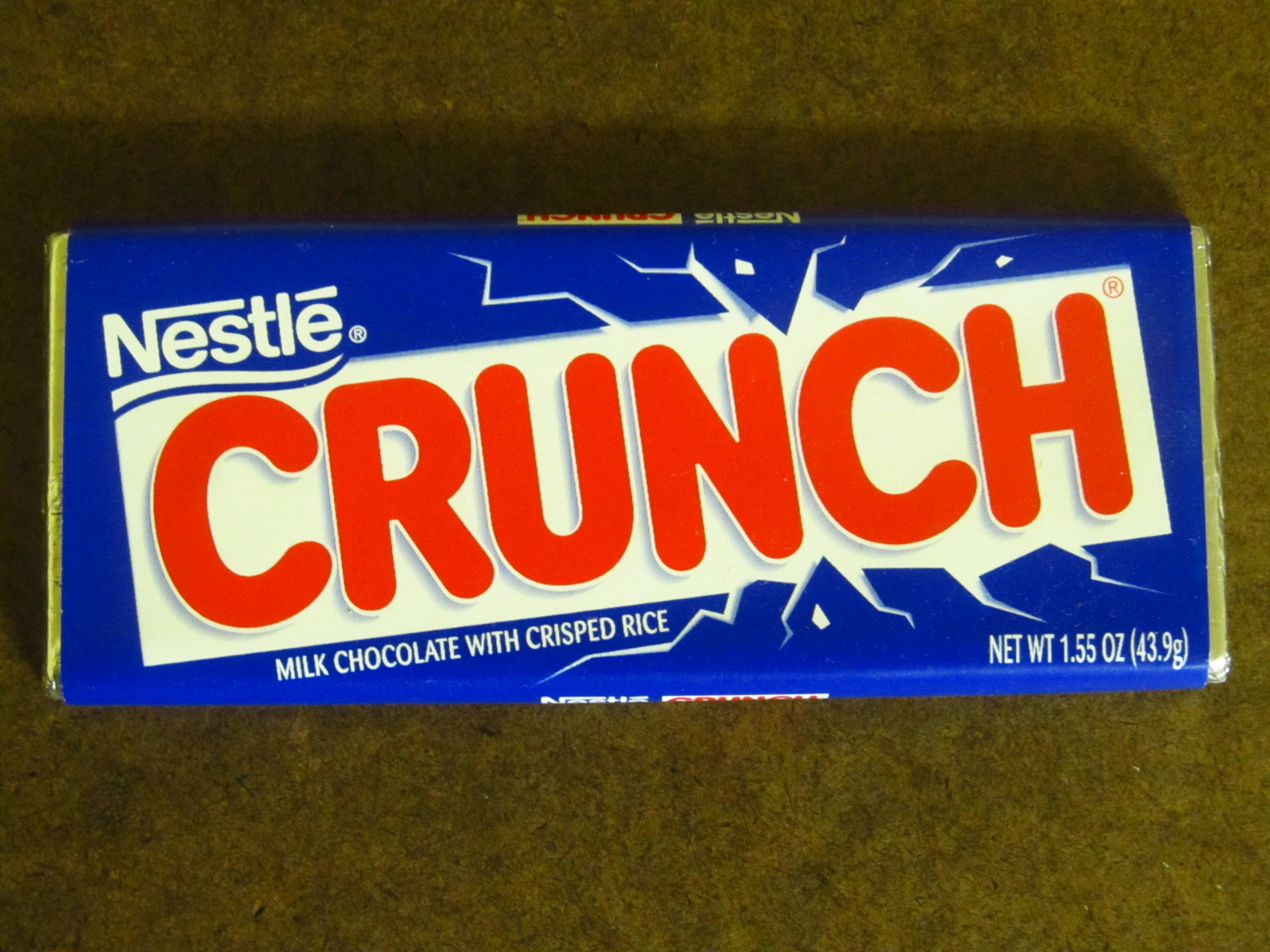
- Product type: Chocolate bar
- Produced by: Nestlé
- Country: United States
- Introduced: 1938
- Website: www.crunchbar.com

US Nestlé Crunch packaging until 2018

Crunch is a chocolate bar made of milk chocolate and crisped rice first introduced in 1938. It is produced globally by Nestlé with the exception of the United States, where it is produced under license by the Ferrara Candy Company, a subsidiary of Ferrero.

== History ==
Nestlé Crunch was first introduced in 1938. The Swiss company created the bar at its Fulton factory in the United States.

In the UK it was sold as Dairy Crunch from its introduction in the mid-1960s up to the 1990s when it was rebranded as Crunch.

In May 2013, Nestlé USA announced that Nestlé Crunch agreed to begin using 100% certified cocoa beans throughout the entire line of its standard Crunch bars for the first time. This plan came to fruition as part of the Nestlé Cocoa Plan, the company’s global initiative to help improve the lives of cocoa farmers and the quality of their products while assuring a sustainable cocoa supply for years to come.

In January 2018, Nestlé announced plans to sell its U.S. confectionery brands (including licensing the U.S. rights to Crunch) to Italian chocolatier Ferrero SpA, maker of Nutella, for US$6.9 billion. Ferrero folded the acquired brands into the operations of the Ferrara Candy Company. The sale was rumoured to be because of low growth in the mainstream chocolate market due to newer competitors such as Kinder and the increased variety of snacks, making it challenging for mainstream candy bars like Crunch. Products sold to Ferrero include (but are not limited to) the Crunch Bar, Butterfinger, Nerds, and Laffy Taffy, and more, marking this as the first time in nearly a century of its existence that the Crunch bar has ever traded ownership.

Nestlé discontinued the traditional packaging technique of wrapping the bar in aluminium foil, sleeved inside a paper label, in favour of more conventional packaging practices, most likely due to the excessive time it took to double-package the bar. The chocolate bar can now commonly be found in a single-ply inner metallized boPET polyester film, typical of convenience food packaging.

As of 2026, Crunch is offered in the US in a variety of sizes including Classic (1.55oz.) which is now a segmented bar, Fun Size, Minis and Giant (4.4oz.).

== Additional products ==
Besides the chocolate bar, Nestlé also produces or licenses other Crunch products:

- Buncha Crunch are candy pieces made of milk chocolate with crisped rice mixed in. Released in 1994, they were originally sold exclusively in movie theaters; as of May 2012, they have become available in most grocery stores.
- Crunch White is a candy bar made with white chocolate instead of milk chocolate.
- Crunch Ice Cream Bars have a firm, vanilla-flavored ice cream center, surrounded by a milk chocolate coating with crisped rice mixed in.
- Crunch with Caramel is a candy bar made with milk chocolate and crisped rice mixed in, containing a caramel center.
- Crunch with Peanuts is a limited edition candy bar made with milk chocolate and crisped rice mixed in, containing peanuts.
- Dark Crunch with Caramel is a limited edition candy bar made with dark chocolate and crisped rice mixed in, containing a caramel center.
- Crunch Stixx is a variant of Crunch, which consists of wafers and Crunch Candy Creme.
- Crunch Dark Stixx is a variant of Crunch, which consists of wafers and Crunch Dark Candy Creme.
- Crunch Dark and Buncha Crunch Dark consisted of crisped rice and dark chocolate. Crunch Dark is available in single-bar packages. Buncha Crunch Dark is available in resealable stand-up bags and concession box sizes. The products were launched in collaboration with Candytopia. These products were supposedly available for a limited time through July 2018 but were never discontinued.
- Crunch Mocha is a discontinued candy bar made with mocha instead of milk chocolate.
- Crunch Crisp is a full size candy bar made with wafers and chocolate creme.
- Crunch Cereal is a chocolate breakfast cereal with crispy rice and wheat clusters.
- YoCrunch brand yogurt features Crunch mix-ins in both Strawberry and Vanilla yogurt flavors. The pieces themselves resemble Buncha Crunch.
- Crunchettes are "Bite Size" Pieces of Crunch.
- Magic Crunch was a limited edition original Crunch Bar with pop rocks.
- Crunch Biscuit is a candy bar made with small pieces of biscuit replacing crisped rice.
- Crunch Girl Scout candy bars were released in 2014 in three limited-edition flavors: Caramel & Coconut (Caramel deLites/Samoas), Peanut Butter Crème (Peanut Butter Patties/Tagalongs), and Thin Mints.

== Slogans ==
- S·CRUNCH·OUS
- Music to your mouth
- Munch Now. Munch Some Later.
- For the Kid in You.
- It's just more fun to munch.

== See also ==
- Chokito – another crisped rice and chocolate bar from Nestlé
- Krackel
- List of chocolate bar brands
