= List of the Hershey Company brands =

List of brands from the Hershey Company

Here is a list of brands manufactured by the Hershey Company. Some of the brands began production over 165 years ago like the Hershey Kiss and Hershey Bar. Hershey produces a variety of products which are chocolate or candy based and the Hershey Company also produces gum. The list excludes licensed items such as beer, cereal, ice cream, and chocolate milk which are made by brands including Yuengling, General Mills, Breyers, Good Humor, Julie's Biscuits (only sold in the Philippines and Malaysia), Selecta Ice Cream (only sold in the Philippines), Klondike, and Natrel.

== Chocolate-based candies ==
Hershey produces a large variety of chocolate based products. The company is also licensed to produce Cadbury products as well as the Kit Kat bar and Rolo candies (which are both owned by Nestlé).

=== Bars ===
- Almond Joy, coconut topped with almonds and covered in milk chocolate
- Cadbury Dairy Milk, (only in the United States under license from Cadbury) various products, all made with milk chocolate
- Cadbury Dream (only in the U.S.; called Cadbury White in the UK), made of white chocolate
- 5th Avenue, peanut butter crunch layers covered in chocolate
- Eat-More
- Heath bar, toffee and almonds in milk chocolate
- Hershey bar
- Hershey bar with almonds
- Hershey Bliss
- Glosette (only sold in Canada)
- Hershey's Chipits (only sold in Canada)
- Hershey's Choco Balls, in Cookies 'n' Cremé, Cookies 'n' Chocolate, and Choco Balls Duo (only sold in the Philippines)
- Hershey's Choco Tubes, in Cookies 'n' Cremé and Cookies 'n' Milk Choco (only sold in the Philippines, Malaysia, Thailand, and Singapore)
- Hershey's Plant Based Chocolate, Oat Chocolate with Almonds
- Hershey's Drops
- Hershey's Eggies (only sold in Canada)
- Hershey's Extra Dark Chocolate
- Hershey's Kisses
- Hershey's Kisses Special Selection (only sold in the Philippines)
- Hershey's Miniatures
- Hershey's Nuggets
- Hershey's Special Creations, in Almond Crunch, Choco Cheesecake, Choco Tiramisu, and Strawberry 'n' Cremé (only sold in the Philippines)
- Hershey's Special Dark, which consists of 45% cacao solids
- Oh Henry!, containing peanuts, caramel, and fudge
- Kit Kat (only sold in the U.S. under license from Nestle)
- Krackel, crisped rice in chocolate
- Military chocolate, part of standard U.S. military rations
- Mounds, coconut covered in dark chocolate
- Mr. Goodbar, consisting of peanuts in chocolate
- NutRageous
- Reese's Fast Break, a chocolate bar with peanut butter filling
- Reese's Plant Based Peanut Butter Cups, oat chocolate with peanut butter filling
- Reese's Peanut Butter Cups
- Reese's Sticks
- Reese's Take 5
- Reese's Pieces
- Skor, butter toffee covered in milk chocolate
- Snack Barz, crisped rice held together with marshmallow and coated with milk chocolate
- Symphony
- Whatchamacallit
- Whozeewhatzit
- Zero bar, caramel, peanut and almond nougat covered in white chocolate fudge
- Zagnut, a candy bar of peanut butter surrounded by toasted coconut

=== Other ===
- Brookside (was only sold in Canada)
- Cadbury Creme Egg (only in the U.S. under license from Cadbury)
- Cherry Blossom, a maraschino cherry and cherry syrup surrounded by a mixture of chocolate, shredded coconut and roasted peanut pieces (discontinued)
- Hershey's Bites (discontinued)
- Hershey-Ets (sold at Hershey's Chocolate World, Hershey's store website year-round, and on a seasonal basis at some retailers), small pellets of milk chocolate with a hard-candy coating, similar to M&M's
- Hershey's Kissables (discontinued)
- Hershey's 'n' More (was only sold in the Philippines, discontinued)
- Hershey's Treats (was only sold in the Philippines, discontinued)
- Milk Duds
- Rolo (sold only in the U.S. under license from Nestle)
- Swoops (discontinued)
- Tastetations (discontinued)
- York Peppermint Pattie
- Whoppers, malted milk balls with an artificially flavored "chocolatey coating"

== Non-chocolate-based candies ==
- Breath Savers, breath mints
- Bubble Yum, bubble gum
- Clodhopper, fudge-covered graham clusters
- Good & Fruity
- Good & Plenty
- Ice Breakers candy, mints, and chewing gum
- Jolly Rancher
- Lancaster Soft Crèmes
- Nutrine, lollipop, maha lacto, and chocolaty éclair
- PayDay, a candy bar of salted peanuts rolled over a nougat-like sweet caramel center
- Pelon Pelo Rico, a tamarind-flavored candy originating in Mexico
- Shaq-a-licious XL Gummies, a line of oversized gummy candy, in partnership with Shaquille O'Neal
- Twizzlers

== Salty snacks ==
- Dot's Pretzels, a line of twist pretzels which are seasoned in various flavors rather than only traditional salt
- Pirate's Booty, a corn and rice cheddar cheese puff
- SkinnyPop, a popcorn line which uses dairy-free flavoring for most of its varieties

== Others ==
- Hershey's cocoa
- Hershey's spreads
- Hershey's syrup
- One Chip Challenge (discontinued)

== Licensed products ==
=== Drinks ===
- Yuengling Hershey's Chocolate Porter
- Soyfresh Hershey's Soy Milk (only sold in the Philippines, Malaysia, Thailand, and Singapore)
- Sunnysky Cold Brew Mocha Latte
- Harlan Fairbanks Hershey's Freeze - Milk Chocolate
- Mexican Leche Hershey's Chocolate Drink Box
- Reese's International Delight Iced Coffee
- Jolly Rancher the Ryl Co. tea
- Hershey's and Reese's Whipped Creme (Kraft Heinz)
- C4 Reese's and Hershey's Whey Protein Powder (U.S.)

=== Fast food ===
- Reese's n Chip it's McFlurry (McDonald's, sold only in Canada, 2024)
- Hershey's S'mores McFlurry (McDonald's, sold only in the U.S.)
- Hershey's Cookie N Cream McFlurry (McDonald's, sold only in Costa Rica, available also with bites)
- Hershey's Kisses Mix-Ins (Jollibee, sold only in the Philippines, 2014)
- Skor McFlurry (McDonald's, sold only in Canada)
- Kitkat Banana Split McFlurry (U.S.)
- Kitkat McFlurry (McDonald's, in selected markets, available with Milo in Singapore)
- DQ Hershey's Blizzard series (Mango Cookie, Double Cocoa and Cookie Buttercrisp)
- DQ Reese's Blizzard
- Reese's Peanut Butter Cup Pie
- KitKat Sundae, Burger King, (part of Burger Kings KitKat Fusion in selected markets)
- Hershey's® Sundae Pie (available in the U.S. also Creme Pie)
- Mounds Creme Pie (Burger King, U.S.)
- Reese's Peanut Butter Cups Mix-Ins (Jollibee, sold only in the Philippines, 2016)
- Reese's Peanut Butter Pie (Burger King, sold only in the U.S.)
- Reese's Frosty Fusions (only sold in the U.S. at Wendy's), also in Reese's X Oreo
- Hershey's Cone (McDonald's, sold only in Singapore)
- Jolly Rancher Slush (formerly at Tim Hortons, now at Harvey's)
- Hershey's My Sundae (formerly at Ministop, now at Uncle John's, sold only in the Philippines)
- Hershey's Shillz Perk Up, Chill Out! (formerly at Ministop, now at Uncle John's, sold only in the Philippines)
- Hershey's Karimlan Bread (formerly at Ministop, now at Uncle John's, sold only in the Philippines)
- Chocolate King Fusion with Reese's (Burger King, sold only in the Philippines)

=== Cereal ===
Made and licensed with Post and General Mills

- KitKat (U.S., Canada)
- Kisses (Canada)
- Reese's Puffs (U.S. and Canada)
- Hershey's Chocolatey Bites (Australia)
- Hershey's Cookies and Cream Fillows (U.S., 2019)
- Hershey's Chocos (India)
- Hershey's Cookies N Creme (U.S.)
- Cocoa Puffs "Made with Hershey's Cocoa" (1996, 1964)
- Jolly Ranchers (2019, U.S.)
- Reese's Puffs "Big Puff" (U.S.)
- Hershey's Choco Bites (Japan), known as Choco Crunch in South Korea
- Hershey's Choc Cereal Cookies N Creme (Mexico)

=== Ice Cream ===
- Selecta, (sold only in the Philippines)
- Breyers, (U.S. and Canada, available in Hershey's in the U.S. and Reese's in both countries)
- Klondike

=== Snacks ===
- Reese's X Oreo (U.S.)
- Reese's Chips Ahoy
- Hershey's X Ocean Spray, Milk Chocolate Dipped Cranberry Bites and Dark Chocolate Dipped Cherry Infused Cranberry Bites,
- Haribo, Jolly Rancher, and Twizzlers assorted bags
- Julie's Hershey's Biscuits (sold only in the Philippines and Malaysia)
