= H. B. Reese =

American inventor and businessman (1879–1956)

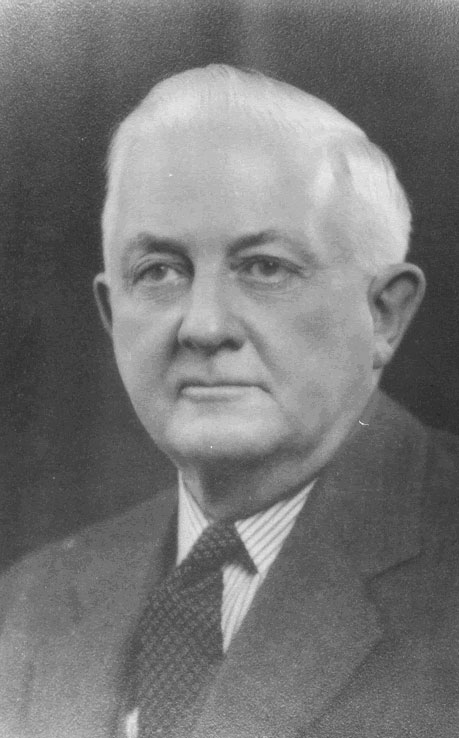
- Born: Harry Burnett Reese; May 24, 1879; York County, Pennsylvania, U.S.
- Died: May 16, 1956 (aged 76); West Palm Beach, Florida, U.S.
- Resting place: Hershey Cemetery, Hershey, PA
- Other names: HB, Harry Reese, Poppy Reese, Mr. Reese's
- Occupation: Chocolatier/Confectioner
- Known for: Inventing Reese's Peanut Butter Cups
- Title: Founder and Chairman of the Board, H. B. Reese Candy Company, Hershey, PA
- Spouse: Blanche Edna Hyson (m. 1900)
- Children: 16

Harry Burnett Reese (May 24, 1879 – May 16, 1956) was an American inventor and businessman known for creating Reese's Peanut Butter Cups, and founding the H. B. Reese Candy Company. In 2009, he was posthumously inducted into the Candy Hall of Fame.

== Early life ==
H. B. Reese was born on May 24, 1879, on the Frosty Hill Farm, an agricultural and dairy farm located near the Muddy Creek Forks Historic District in York County, Pennsylvania. He was of Welsh and English descent and was the only child of Annie Belinda Manifold (1854–1935) and Aquilla Asbury Reese Jr. (1845–1914). In addition to his farmland work, Reese raised frogs that he sold to restaurants in the Baltimore area. By 1898, Reese was an established French horn player who performed with local area bands.

== Marriage and family ==
On August 1, 1900, Reese married Blanche Edna Hyson (1882–1968), the daughter of Mary Elizabeth Markey (1857–1952) and Robert Bortner Hyson (1853–1930). Together they had 16 children, 8 daughters and 8 sons (13 of whom survived to adulthood).

Reese's mother Annie Belinda Manifold (1854–1935) and her sisters Elizabeth Turner Manifold (1846–1910) and Mary Collins Manifold (1847–1933) lived with him for the rest of their lives. At least 20 family members were present during a typical Reese family supper and sometimes more than 40.

== Early career ==
By 1903, Reese was managing the fishing operations of his father-in-law's cannery business located in Ditchley, Virginia. In 1912 he managed a dairy farm in Woodbine, Pennsylvania, but took a factory job in New Freedom, Pennsylvania, in 1915 to support his growing family.

=== Dairy manager for Mr. Hershey ===
In 1916, Reese read an ad in the York Daily Record by Milton S. Hershey seeking to hire people to manage and operate his numerous dairy farms that were located in the Hershey, Pennsylvania, area. In 1917, Hershey hired Reese to work as a dairyman at Farm 28-A. In 1918, Hershey asked Reese to manage a dairy farm called the Round Barn. Hershey visited the Round Barn every two weeks because it was an experimental dairy farm that used new milking machines (more efficient than milking cows by hand) as he sought new approaches to animal treatment and milk production. In 1919, Hershey found the Round Barn too expensive to operate and closed it.

== Early candy ventures ==
=== R&R Candy Company ===
Jobless in 1919, Reese formed a new business called the R&R Candy Company that he operated from an old canning factory located in Hummelstown, Pennsylvania, where he manufactured milk chocolate covered almonds and raisins, selling them to local stores.

=== Superior Chocolate and Confectionery Company ===
Reese knew he needed high-quality manufacturing equipment in order to boost the potential of his Hummelstown, Pennsylvania, candy business. In January 1920, he reorganized the R&R Candy Company as the Superior Chocolate and Confectionery Company and proceeded to raise today's equivalent of $290,000 by issuing stock in the newly formed company. A State charter for the new company was issued on May 14, 1920, with the following company officers:

- President: Joseph Burkholder
- Secretary: E. M. Hershey
- Treasurer: J. Landis Strickler
- Manager: Harry B. Reese

Nonetheless, the business ultimately failed.

Under pressure to support his 10 children — with yet another baby on the way — Reese took a paper mill job in Spring Grove, Pennsylvania, where he worked a second job as a butcher. He also had a third job canning vegetables.

== Hershey factory employee ==
In 1921, Reese's father-in-law purchased a home at 18 E. Areba Avenue in Hershey, Pennsylvania, for his son-in-law's growing family. With his return to Hershey, Reese began working at The Hershey Company factory in the shipping department and was soon promoted to foreman.

On the side, working from the basement of his Areba Avenue home, he made a variety of confectionery products including hard candy, chocolate covered nuts and raisins, mints as well as two popular milk chocolate covered caramel-coconut candy bars that he invented:

1. The Lizzie Bar named for his oldest daughter, Mary Elizabeth.
2. The Johnny Bar named for his son, John, who worked alongside his father in The Hershey Company shipping department.

The ingredients for both bars included fresh grated coconut, caramel, molasses, cocoa butter and honey. The main difference between the two bars was that the Johnny Bar had nuts as an ingredient. From the very beginning, Reese used chocolate manufactured by The Hershey Company for his chocolate coatings.

== H. B. Reese Candy Company ==
Reese incorporated the H. B. Reese Candy Company in 1923. Selling a large assortment of candies on consignment, his employees coated by hand each piece of candy on marble slabs, some coated with milk chocolate and others with dark chocolate that were placed in two-pound and five-pound boxes that were sold in department store candy displays. To promote sales, Reese set up special coating tables in the front display windows of large, downtown department stores and had his employees coat candies in full view of shoppers passing by while other employees handed out freshly made samples.

Below is a brief list of the candy initially manufactured by the H. B. Reese Candy Company. They were made with ingredients such as real cocoa butter, fresh cream, fresh grated coconut and freshly roasted peanuts:

- Butter cream
- Butterscotch
- Chocolate Jets*
- Coated Dates*
- Coconut Caramel*
- Coconut Cream*
- Cream Caramel
- Honey Dew Coconut*
- Marshmallow
- Marshmallow-Nut*
- Nuttees*
- Nougat*
- Peanut Butter Cups*
- Peanut Clusters*
- Peppermint Cream*
- Raisin Clusters*

Note: *These 12 candies were sold in five-pound boxes during the holiday season.

Borrowing money from a York County, Pennsylvania bank in 1926, Reese built a large home and a new factory that were located next to each other at 203-205 W Caracas Ave in Hershey, Pennsylvania. By 1935, he had 62 employees as well as his 6 sons working for him and was so successful that he was able to pay off all his mortgages.

== Reese's Peanut Butter Cups ==
By 1928, H. B. and Blanche had 16 children. That same year, Reese invented Reese's Peanut Butter Cups after one of his customers in Harrisburg, Pennsylvania, reported supply problems with another confectioner who made a candy consisting of peanut butter covered with chocolate. Reese developed an automated manufacturing process and the candy became part of his assorted chocolate line. Soon the company was packaging 120 individually wrapped pieces per box that sold for a penny per cup. Each candy wrapper prominently displayed the slogan: "Made in Chocolate Town, So They Must Be Good". Sales of the penny peanut butter cup helped Reese pay off the mortgages on both his house and factory by 1935. This was especially noteworthy since the United States was still in the grip of the Great Depression and chocolate was considered a luxury.

The product gained in popularity and quickly became Reese's primary focus. During World War II, economic constraints and scarcity of materials led him to discontinue his other candies. In 1943, the five-cent cup was introduced and as packaging machine and plant automation were placed into production, the sales of Reese's doubled every four years.

Before Reese died in 1956, he began construction of a second plant located at 925 Reese Avenue, Hershey, Pennsylvania. Completed on November 30, 1957, this new modern plant contained 100,000 square feet of state-of-the-art manufacturing technology built at a cost equivalent of $6.9 million at a time when the sales of Reese's were equivalent to $125 million.

== Death ==
After a short illness, H. B. Reese died of a heart attack eight days before his 77th birthday, on May 16, 1956, at the St. Mary's Medical Center in West Palm Beach, Florida, where he had been vacationing. His residence at the time of his death was located at 630 Linden Road in Hershey, Pennsylvania.

== Legacy ==
On July 2, 1963 (seven years after the death of H. B. Reese), when the sales of Reese's were equivalent to $243 million, his sons Robert, John, Ed, Ralph, Harry and Charles Richard Reese, merged the H. B. Reese Candy Company with The Hershey Company in a tax free stock-for-stock merger. In 2026 after 63 years of stock splits, the Reese brothers' original 666,316 shares of Hershey common stock represent 16 million Hershey shares valued at over $4.4 billion that pay annual cash dividends of $92.9 million. At the time of its 1963 merger, the H. B. Reese Candy Company was celebrating its 40th anniversary and had just added 200,000 square feet of new state-of-the-art manufacturing capacity to its 925 Reese Avenue plant in Hershey. In 1969, only six years after the Reese/Hershey merger, Reese's Peanut Butter Cups became the best-selling product of The Hershey Company.

As of September 20, 2012, Reese's were the No. 1 selling candy brand in the United States with sales of $2.603 billion. Furthermore, back in 1973, the H. B. Reese Candy Company plant added yet another 200,000 square feet of manufacturing space in order to begin production of the Kit Kat for sale in the United States which had 2012 U.S. sales of $948 million, making Kit Kat the No. 4 selling candy brand in the United States.

== See also ==
- List of chocolatiers
- List of products manufactured by The Hershey Company
- List of top-selling candy brands
- Peanut butter cup
