= Richard Childress Racing =

Auto-racing company

- Owner(s): Richard Childress (60%); Chartwell Investments (40%)
- Principal: Mike Verlander (President)
- Base: Welcome, North Carolina
- Series: NASCAR Cup Series; NASCAR O'Reilly Auto Parts Series; ARCA Menards Series
- Race drivers: Cup Series: 3. Austin Dillon; 33. Austin Hill; O'Reilly Auto Parts Series: 2. Carson Brown; 3. Austin Dillon (part-time); 21. Chandler Smith; 33. Cleetus McFarland (part-time); ARCA Menards Series: 33. Cleetus McFarland
- Manufacturer: Chevrolet
- Opened: 1969
- Website: rcrracing.com

Career
- Debut: Cup Series: 1969 Talladega 500 (Talladega); O'Reilly Auto Parts Series; 1995 Sundrop 400 (Hickory); Camping World Truck Series: 1995 Skoal Bandit Copper World Classic (Phoenix); ARCA Menards Series: 1995 Hoosier General Tire 500k (Atlanta)
- Latest race: Cup Series: 2026 Season Finale 400 (Homestead) O'Reilly Auto Parts Series: 2026 O'Reilly Auto Parts 300 (Homestead) Camping World Truck Series: 2014 Pocono Mountains 150 (Pocono); ARCA Menards Series: 2011 Federated Car Care 200 (Toledo)
- Races competed: Total: 2,850; Cup Series: 1,707; O'Reilly Auto Parts Series: 866; Camping World Truck Series: 220; ARCA Menards Series: 57
- Drivers' Championships: Total: 15; Cup Series: 6; 1986, 1987, 1990, 1991, 1993, 1994; O'Reilly Auto Parts Series: 6; 2001, 2006, 2008, 2013, 2019, 2025; Camping World Truck Series: 2; 1995, 2011; ARCA Menards Series: 1; 2011
- Race victories: Total: 266; Cup Series: 118; O'Reilly Auto Parts Series: 107; Camping World Truck Series: 31; ARCA Menards Series: 10
- Pole positions: Total: 201; Cup Series: 58; O'Reilly Auto Parts Series: 94; Camping World Truck Series: 39; ARCA Menards Series: 10

Richard Childress Racing (RCR) is an American professional stock car racing team that currently competes in the NASCAR Cup Series, the NASCAR O'Reilly Auto Parts Series and the ARCA Menards Series. The team is based in Welcome, North Carolina, and is owned and operated by Richard Childress with a 40 percent ownership by Chartwell Investments.

In the Cup Series, the team currently fields two Chevrolet Camaro ZL1s: the No. 3 full-time for Austin Dillon and the No. 33 for Austin Hill. In the O'Reilly Auto Parts Series, the team currently fields four Chevrolet Camaro teams: the No. 2 full-time for Brown, the No. 3 part-time for Dillon, the No. 21 full-time for Smith, and the No. 33 part-time for Cleetus McFarland. In the ARCA Menards Series, the team currently fields one Chevrolet SS: the No. 33 full-time for McFarland. RCR has had at least one car successfully qualify for every Cup race since 1972, the longest such active streak, and is known for the longstanding use of the number 3 on its primary race car.

In addition to its in-house Cup Series teams, RCR has several technical alliances and partnerships with other teams. In the Cup Series, it is allied with Rick Ware Racing. In the O'Reilly Auto Parts Series, Big Machine Racing, Jordan Anderson Racing and Viking Motorsports have a technical alliance with the team, with Big Machine Racing having shops on the RCR campus in Welcome, North Carolina. Beyond this, RCR also has collaborative agreements with Beard Motorsports, although these are not technical alliances.

RCR has won the NASCAR Cup Series championship six times, all with driver Dale Earnhardt, as well as the Daytona 500 three times; Earnhardt in 1998, Kevin Harvick in 2007, and Austin Dillon in 2018. The team has also fielded cars for notables such as Jeff Burton, Mike Skinner, Ricky Rudd, Neil Bonnett, Ryan Newman, Clint Bowyer, and Kyle Busch.

== Camping World Truck Series ==
=== Truck No. 03 history ===
In 1996, RCR fielded the No. 03 RealTree Camouflage Chevy for Jay Sauter at Las Vegas Motor Speedway. He finished 22nd.

==== Truck No. 03 results ====
| Year | Driver | No. | Make | 1 | 2 | 3 | 4 | 5 | 6 | 7 | 8 | 9 | 10 | 11 | 12 | 13 | 14 | 15 | 16 | 17 | 18 | 19 | 20 | 21 | 22 | 23 | 24 | Owners | Pts |
|---|---|---|---|---|---|---|---|---|---|---|---|---|---|---|---|---|---|---|---|---|---|---|---|---|---|---|---|---|---|
| 1996 | Jay Sauter | 03 | Chevy | HOM | PHO | POR | EVG | TUS | CNS | HPT | BRI | NZH | MLW | LVL | I70 | IRP | FLM | GLN | NSV | RCH | NHA | MAR | NWS | SON | MMR | PHO | LVS; 22 | | |

=== Truck No. 2 history ===
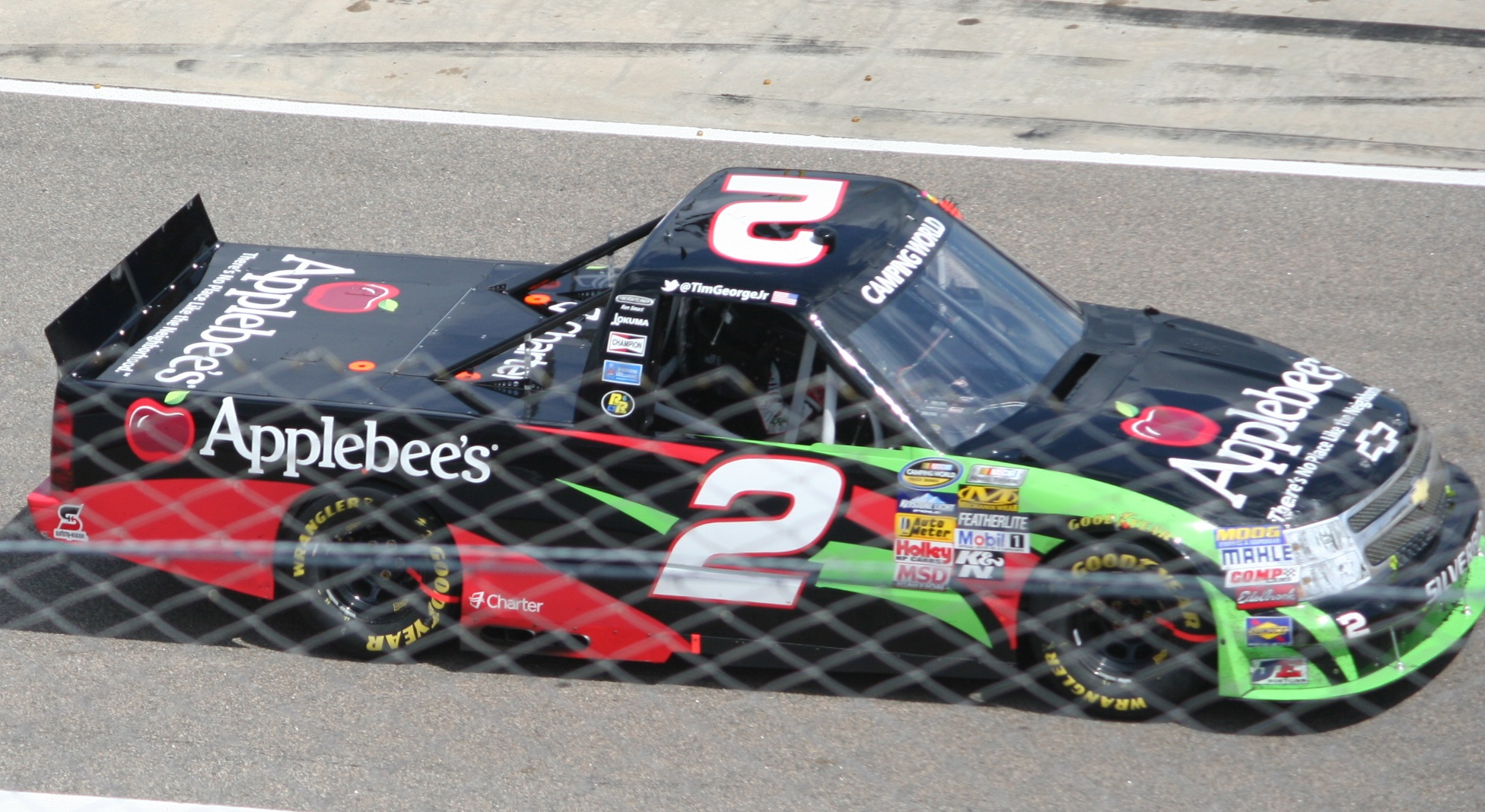
Tim George Jr. in 2012.

Multiple Drivers (2012)

For 2012, RCR took over the No. 2 truck of KHI that won the Owners Championship in 2011. The truck was split by Tim George Jr. running twelve races with Applebee's sponsoring, with a best finish of ninth, Brendan Gaughan in seven races with a best finish of second, and Harvick at both Martinsville races and Dover, winning at the spring Martinsville race. George Jr. was set to run another partial season in 2013, but he decided to move to Wauters Motorsports instead.

Part Time (2014)

Austin Dillon ran the No. 2 truck at Eldora in 2014 with sponsorship from American Ethanol.

==== Truck No. 2 results ====
| Year | Driver | No. | Make | 1 | 2 | 3 | 4 | 5 | 6 | 7 | 8 | 9 | 10 | 11 | 12 | 13 | 14 | 15 | 16 | 17 | 18 | 19 | 20 | 21 | 22 | Owners | Pts |
|---|---|---|---|---|---|---|---|---|---|---|---|---|---|---|---|---|---|---|---|---|---|---|---|---|---|---|---|
| 2012 | Brendan Gaughan | 2 | Chevy | DAY; 20 | | | | CLT; 12 | | TEX; 4 | | | CHI; 2* | | | BRI; 5 | | | | LVS; 4 | | | TEX; 17 | PHO; 23 | | | |
| 2012 | Kevin Harvick | 2 | Chevy | | MAR; 1* | | | | DOV; 3* | | | | | | | | | | | | | MAR; 12* | | | | | |
| 2012 | Tim George Jr. | 2 | Chevy | | | CAR; 16 | KAN; 17 | | | | KEN; 24 | IOW; 15 | | POC; 15 | MCH; 21 | | ATL; 28 | IOW; 22 | KEN; 18 | | TAL; 9 | | | | HOM; 18 | | |
| 2014 | Austin Dillon | 2 | Chevy | DAY | MAR | KAN | CLT | DOV | TEX | GTW | KEN | IOW | ELD; 10 | POC | MCH | BRI | MSP | CHI | NHA | LVS | TAL | MAR | TEX | PHO | HOM | | |

=== Truck No. 3 history ===
Mike Skinner (1995–1996)

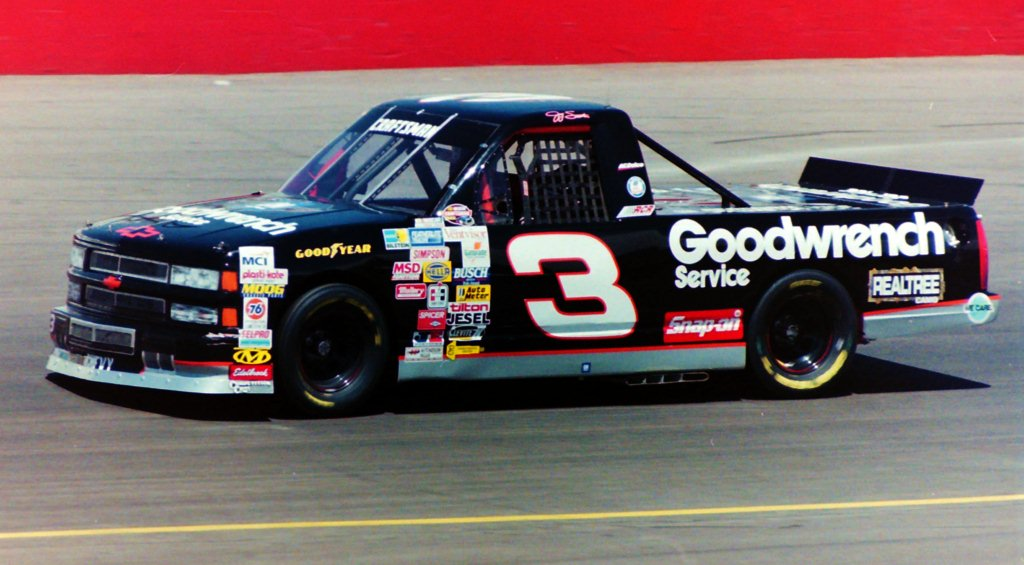
Jay Sauter in 1997, running the classic GM Goodwrench scheme.

In the infant years of the CWTS (then known as the SuperTruck Series), RCR fielded its own truck team, the No. 3 Goodwrench Chevy. 37-year-old driver Mike Skinner was signed to drive the truck for the 1995 season. Skinner won the series' inaugural race at Phoenix International Raceway, passing Winston Cup driver Terry Labonte on the final lap of the race. He went on to win eight races, and won the series first championship by a 126-point margin. Skinner won eight more races and finished third in points in 1996. Skinner scored a total of sixteen wins and fifteen poles over two seasons.

Jay Sauter (1997–1999)

After Skinner moved onto the Cup series, Jay Sauter hopped on board, winning four times and finishing in the top 10 in points all three years. He was the last driver to win for RCR in the NASCAR Truck Series, until July 11, 2010, when Childress's grandson, Austin Dillon, won the Lucas Oil 200 at Iowa Speedway. After 1999, Childress moved the program up to the NASCAR Busch Series.

Austin Dillon (2009–2011)

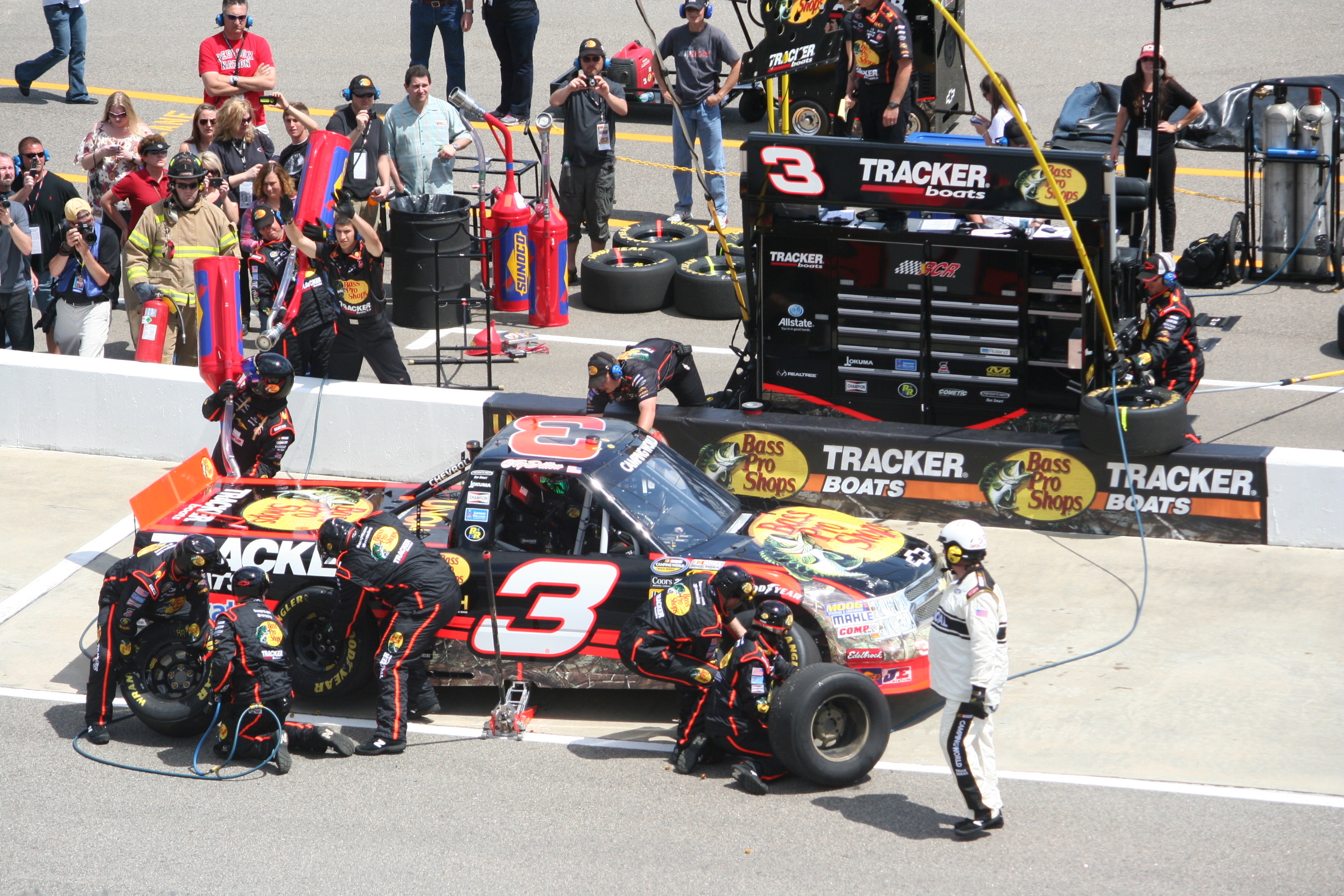
Third-generation driver Ty Dillon at Rockingham in 2012.

The truck team returned during the 2009 season as the No. 3 Chevrolet Silverado driven by Childress's grandson, Austin Dillon for the inaugural race at Iowa Speedway. Dillon would start ninth and finish twelfth despite an early spin.

In 2010, Dillon drove the No. 3 truck full-time sponsored by Bass Pro Shops. Austin won an impressive five poles, two wins (Iowa and Vegas), and had fifteen top-tens en route to a fifth place finish in the championship and the 2010 ROTY award.

In 2011, Dillon drove the No. 3 truck to two wins at Nashville and Chicago, winning the championship over Johnny Sauter.

Ty Dillon (2012–2013)

After winning the Truck Series championship, Austin moved up to the Nationwide Series, passing down the No. 3 truck to his brother Ty Dillon for 2012. Ty would take his first win at Atlanta and nearly won the championship at Homestead before crashing while battling Kyle Larson. Ty finished fourth in the standings.

In the 2013 WinStar World Casino 350K, Dillon won the 100th victory in NASCAR for a No. 3.

Part-time (2014)

Ty Dillon returned to the No. 3 truck with Bass Pro Shops for the dirt race at Eldora in 2014. After the Eldora race, Austin Dillon then won with the No. 3 at Pocono, with Yuengling as a sponsor.

==== Truck No. 3 results ====
| Year | Driver | No. | Make | 1 | 2 | 3 | 4 | 5 | 6 | 7 | 8 | 9 | 10 | 11 | 12 | 13 | 14 | 15 | 16 | 17 | 18 | 19 | 20 | 21 | 22 | 23 | 24 | 25 | 26 | 27 | Owners | Pts |
|---|---|---|---|---|---|---|---|---|---|---|---|---|---|---|---|---|---|---|---|---|---|---|---|---|---|---|---|---|---|---|---|---|
| 1995 | Mike Skinner | 3 | Chevy | PHO; 1* | TUS; 27 | SGS; 5* | MMR; 4 | POR; 1* | EVG; 4 | I70; 1* | LVL; 1* | BRI; 20 | MLW; 1* | CNS; 2 | HPT; 5 | IRP; 1* | FLM; 3 | RCH; 3 | MAR; 2* | NWS; 10 | SON; 3 | MMR; 1 | PHO; 1* | | | | | | | | 1st | 3224 |
| 1996 | Mike Skinner | 3 | Chevy | HOM; 20* | PHO; 2 | POR; 3 | EVG; 5 | TUS; 1 | CNS; 1* | HPT; 1* | BRI; 4* | NZH; 14 | MLW; 7 | LVL; 2 | I70; 2 | IRP; 1* | FLM; 1* | GLN; 3 | NSV; 16* | RCH; 1* | NHA; 27 | MAR; 1 | NWS; 9* | SON; 3 | MMR; 1 | PHO; 4 | LVS; 7 | | | | 3rd | 3771 |
| 1997 | Jay Sauter | 3 | Chevy | WDW; 4 | TUS; 3 | HOM; 19 | PHO; 11 | POR; 10 | EVG; 30 | I70; 31 | NHA; 1 | TEX; 11 | BRI; 3 | NZH; 9 | MLW; 2 | LVL; 31 | CNS; 4 | HPT; 16 | IRP; 31 | FLM; 6 | NSV; 13 | GLN; 12 | RCH; 3 | MAR; 7 | SON; 3 | MMR; 4 | CAL; 25 | PHO; 7 | LVS; 4 | | 6th | 3467 |
| 1998 | Jay Sauter | 3 | Chevy | WDW; 7 | HOM; 3 | PHO; 6 | POR; 8 | EVG; 16 | I70; 16 | GLN; 2 | TEX; 16 | BRI; 12 | MLW; 14 | NZH; 3 | CAL; 24 | PPR; 22 | IRP; 10 | NHA; 11 | FLM; 13 | NSV; 15 | HPT; 7 | LVL; 20 | RCH; 17 | MEM; 2 | GTY; 3 | MAR; 1 | SON; 8 | MMR; 8 | PHO; 12 | LVS; 4 | 4th | 3672 |
| 1999 | Jay Sauter | 3 | Chevy | HOM; 21 | PHO; 8 | EVG; 19 | MMR; 11 | MAR; 11 | MEM; 3 | PPR; 9 | I70; 14 | BRI; 7 | TEX; 2 | PIR; 8 | GLN; 6 | MLW; 9 | NSV; 12 | NZH; 4 | MCH; 2 | NHA; 11 | IRP; 6 | GTY; 18 | HPT; 3 | RCH; 36 | LVS; 5 | LVL; 1 | TEX; 1 | CAL; 10 | | | 5th | 3543 |
| 2009 | Austin Dillon | 3 | Chevy | DAY | CAL | ATL | MAR | KAN | CLT | DOV | TEX | MCH | MLW | MEM | KEN | IRP | NSH | BRI | CHI | IOW; 12 | GTW | NHA; 15 | LVS | MAR | TAL; DNQ | TEX | PHO | HOM | | | | |
| 2010 | Austin Dillon | 3 | Chevy | DAY; 26 | ATL; 10 | MAR; 16 | NSH; 14 | KAN; 6 | DOV; 21 | CLT; 35 | TEX; 3 | MCH; 5 | IOW; 1* | GTW; 7 | IRP; 6 | POC; 7 | NSH; 2 | DAR; 5 | BRI; 17 | CHI; 9 | KEN; 9 | NHA; 5 | LVS; 1* | MAR; 16 | TAL; 8 | TEX; 25 | PHO; 7 | HOM; 31 | | | | |
| 2011 | Austin Dillon | 3 | Chevy | DAY; 20 | PHO; 5 | DAR; 15 | MAR; 7 | NSH; 11 | DOV; 4 | CLT; 7 | KAN; 12 | TEX; 26 | KEN; 14 | IOW; 2* | NSH; 1 | IRP; 9 | POC; 5 | MCH; 22 | BRI; 23 | ATL; 6 | CHI; 1 | NHA; 2 | KEN; 2 | LVS; 17 | TAL; 7 | MAR; 3 | TEX; 2 | HOM; 10 | | | | |
| 2012 | Ty Dillon | 3 | Chevy | DAY; 9 | MAR; 2 | CAR; 8 | KAN; 9 | CLT; 10 | DOV; 6 | TEX; 7 | KEN; 3 | IOW; 7 | CHI; 12 | POC; 6 | MCH; 6 | BRI; 21 | ATL; 1 | IOW; 2 | KEN; 3 | LVS; 10 | TAL; 4* | MAR; 28 | TEX; 5 | PHO; 15 | HOM; 25 | | | | | | | |
| 2013 | Ty Dillon | 3 | Chevy | DAY; 6* | MAR; 18 | CAR; 12 | KAN; 8 | CLT; 5 | DOV; 31 | TEX; 2* | KEN; 1 | IOW; 16* | ELD; 16 | POC; 20 | MCH; 3 | BRI; 6 | MSP; 17* | IOW; 3 | CHI; 5 | LVS; 4 | TAL; 14* | MAR; 22 | TEX; 1* | PHO; 4 | HOM; 14 | | | | | | | |
| 2014 | Ty Dillon | 3 | Chevy | DAY | MAR | KAN | CLT | DOV | TEX | GTW | KEN | IOW | ELD; 5 | | | | | | | | | | | | | | | | | | | |
| 2014 | Austin Dillon | 3 | Chevy | | | | | | | | | | | POC; 1* | MCH | BRI | MSP | CHI | NHA | LVS | TAL | MAR | TEX | PHO | HOM | | | | | | | |

=== Truck No. 8 history ===
Part-time (1999)

In 1999, RCR fielded the No. 8 truck for Mike Dillon at Watkins Glen and Milwaukee. He finished 30th at the Glen and 32nd at Milwaukee. Jim Sauter run the No. 8 at Michigan. He finished tenth.

==== Truck No. 8 results ====
| Year | Driver | No. | Make | 1 | 2 | 3 | 4 | 5 | 6 | 7 | 8 | 9 | 10 | 11 | 12 | 13 | 14 | 15 | 16 | 17 | 18 | 19 | 20 | 21 | 22 | 23 | 24 | 25 | Owners | Pts |
|---|---|---|---|---|---|---|---|---|---|---|---|---|---|---|---|---|---|---|---|---|---|---|---|---|---|---|---|---|---|---|
| 1999 | Mike Dillon | 8 | Chevy | HOM | PHO | EVG | MMR | MAR | MEM | PPR | I70 | BRI | TEX | PIR | GLN; 30 | MLW; 32 | NSV | NZH | | | | | | | | | | | | |
| 1999 | Jim Sauter | 8 | Chevy | | | | | | | | | | | | | | | | MCH; 10 | NHA | IRP | GTY | HPT | RCH | LVS | LVL | TEX | CAL | | |

=== Truck No. 22 history ===
Tim George Jr. (2009–2010)

Childress' second truck entry debuted in 2009 with Tim George Jr. behind the wheel of the No. 22 truck part-time.

Joey Coulter (2011–2012)

In 2011 with Joey Coulter was tabbed as the driver behind the wheel of the No. 22 truck. Coulter stayed consistent throughout the year, having the least DNF's among all other rookies. Coulter would eventually prevail over Nelson Piquet Jr. and Parker Kligerman to win Rookie of the Year. Coulter would get his first win in the Pocono Mountains 125 at Pocono Raceway, his first win in 36 attempts in the Camping World Truck Series.

==== Truck No. 22 results ====
| Year | Driver | No. | Make | 1 | 2 | 3 | 4 | 5 | 6 | 7 | 8 | 9 | 10 | 11 | 12 | 13 | 14 | 15 | 16 | 17 | 18 | 19 | 20 | 21 | 22 | 23 | 24 | 25 | Owners | Pts |
|---|---|---|---|---|---|---|---|---|---|---|---|---|---|---|---|---|---|---|---|---|---|---|---|---|---|---|---|---|---|---|
| 2009 | Tim George Jr. | 22 | Chevy | DAY | CAL | ATL | MAR | KAN | CLT | DOV | TEX | MCH | MLW | MEM | KEN | IRP | NSH | BRI | CHI | IOW | GTW | NHA | LVS | MAR | TAL | TEX | PHO; 29 | HOM | | |
| 2010 | Tim George Jr. | 22 | Chevy | DAY | ATL | MAR | NSH | KAN | DOV | CLT | TEX | MCH | IOW | GTY | IRP | POC | NSH | DAR | BRI | CHI | KEN | NHA | LVS | MAR | TAL | TEX | PHO; 23 | HOM | | |
| 2011 | Joey Coulter | 22 | Chevy | DAY; 34 | PHO; 9 | DAR; 28 | MAR; 17 | NSH; 24 | DOV; 6 | CLT; 16 | KAN; 5 | TEX; 5 | KEN; 7 | IOW; 5 | NSH; 10 | IRP; 7 | POC; 6 | MCH; 18 | BRI; 6 | ATL; 13 | CHI; 12 | NHA; 11 | KEN; 13 | LVS; 22 | TAL; 20 | MAR; 5 | TEX; 6 | HOM; 5 | | |
| 2012 | Joey Coulter | 22 | Chevy | DAY; 18 | MAR; 30 | CAR; 6 | KAN; 14 | CLT; 7 | DOV; 11 | TEX; 3 | KEN; 7 | IOW; 8 | CHI; 15 | POC; 1 | MCH; 7 | BRI; 4 | ATL; 7 | IOW; 13 | KEN; 4 | LVS; 3* | TAL; 14 | MAR; 3 | TEX; 7 | PHO; 3 | HOM; 3 | | | | | |

=== Truck No. 31 history ===
Part Time (1995)

In 1995, RCR fielded the No. 31 truck part-time for Bill Cooper at Sonoma. He finished 25th. Dave Marcis drove the No. 31 at season finale at Phoenix. He finished seventh.

==== Truck No. 31 results ====
| Year | Driver | No. | Make | 1 | 2 | 3 | 4 | 5 | 6 | 7 | 8 | 9 | 10 | 11 | 12 | 13 | 14 | 15 | 16 | 17 | 18 | 19 | 20 | Owners | Pts |
|---|---|---|---|---|---|---|---|---|---|---|---|---|---|---|---|---|---|---|---|---|---|---|---|---|---|
| 1995 | Bill Cooper | 31 | Chevy | PHO | TUS | SGS | MMR | POR | EVG | I70 | LVL | BRI | MLW | CNS | HPT | IRP | FLM | RCH | MAR | NWS | SON; 25 | MMR | | | |
| 1995 | Dave Marcis | 31 | Chevy | | | | | | | | | | | | | | | | | | | | PHO; 7 | | |

=== Truck No. 33 history ===
Part Time (1997)

In 1997, RCR fielded the No. 33 truck part-time for Mike Dillon at Phoenix. He started 29th and finished 26th.

==== Truck No. 33 results ====
| Year | Driver | No. | Make | 1 | 2 | 3 | 4 | 5 | 6 | 7 | 8 | 9 | 10 | 11 | 12 | 13 | 14 | 15 | 16 | 17 | 18 | 19 | 20 | 21 | 22 | 23 | 24 | 25 | 26 | Owners | Pts |
|---|---|---|---|---|---|---|---|---|---|---|---|---|---|---|---|---|---|---|---|---|---|---|---|---|---|---|---|---|---|---|---|
| 1997 | Mike Dillon | 33 | Chevy | WDW | TUS | HOM | PHO | POR | EVG | I70 | NHA | TEX | BRI | NZH | MLW | LVL | CNS | HPT | IRP | FLM | NSV | GLN | RCH | MAR | SON | MMR | CAL | PHO; 16 | LVS | | |

=== Truck No. 39 history ===
Part Time (2013)

In 2013 RCR purchased the No. 39 owners points from RSS Racing to field the truck for Austin Dillon in the inaugural Mudsummer Classic at Eldora Speedway, with sponsorship from American Ethanol. Dillon led a race-high 63 laps, and won after a green-white-checker finish. The truck, the trophy and the famed piece of dirt track are on display at the NASCAR Hall of Fame. The No. 39 owners points were then sold back to RSS Racing.

==== Truck No. 39 results ====
| Year | Driver | No. | Make | 1 | 2 | 3 | 4 | 5 | 6 | 7 | 8 | 9 | 10 | 11 | 12 | 13 | 14 | 15 | 16 | 17 | 18 | 19 | 20 | 21 | 22 | Owners | Pts |
|---|---|---|---|---|---|---|---|---|---|---|---|---|---|---|---|---|---|---|---|---|---|---|---|---|---|---|---|
| 2013 | Austin Dillon | 39 | Chevy | DAY | MAR | CAR | KAN | CLT | DOV | TEX | KEN | IOW | ELD; 1* | POC | MCH | BRI | MSP | IOW | CHI | LVS | TAL | MAR | TEX | PHO | HOM | | |

=== Truck No. 62 history ===
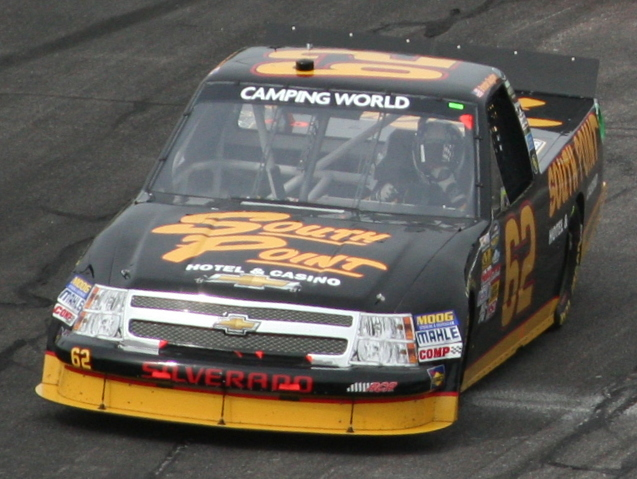
Brendan Gaughan in the No. 62 at Rockingham Speedway in 2013

Brendan Gaughan (2013)

For 2013, Truck Series veteran Brendan Gaughan drove the truck, now numbered 62, for the full season. Gaughan would come close to finding victory lane on multiple occasions, scoring ten top-fives and thirteen top-tens to finish seventh in points. Gaughan and the No. 62 team moved up to the Nationwide series in 2014.

==== Truck No. 62 results ====
| Year | Driver | No. | Make | 1 | 2 | 3 | 4 | 5 | 6 | 7 | 8 | 9 | 10 | 11 | 12 | 13 | 14 | 15 | 16 | 17 | 18 | 19 | 20 | 21 | 22 | Owners | Pts |
|---|---|---|---|---|---|---|---|---|---|---|---|---|---|---|---|---|---|---|---|---|---|---|---|---|---|---|---|
| 2013 | Brendan Gaughan | 62 | Chevy | DAY; 29 | MAR; 12 | CAR; 3 | KAN; 4 | CLT; 2 | DOV; 5 | TEX; 5 | KEN; 25 | IOW; 31 | ELD; 5 | POC; 9 | MCH; 8 | BRI; 16 | MSP; 18 | IOW; 24 | CHI; 25 | LVS; 8 | TAL; 11 | MAR; 2 | TEX; 4 | PHO; 3 | HOM; 4 | | |

== Driver development ==
RCR has featured a strong development program since the 1990s that has groomed several NASCAR regulars, most notably 2014 Cup Series Champion Kevin Harvick and Richard Childress' own grandsons Austin and Ty Dillon. Other notable former development drivers include Johnny Sauter, Mike Skinner, Clint Bowyer, Timothy Peters, John Wes Townley, Joey Coulter, and Ryan Gifford.

=== K&N Pro Series and ARCA Menards Series ===
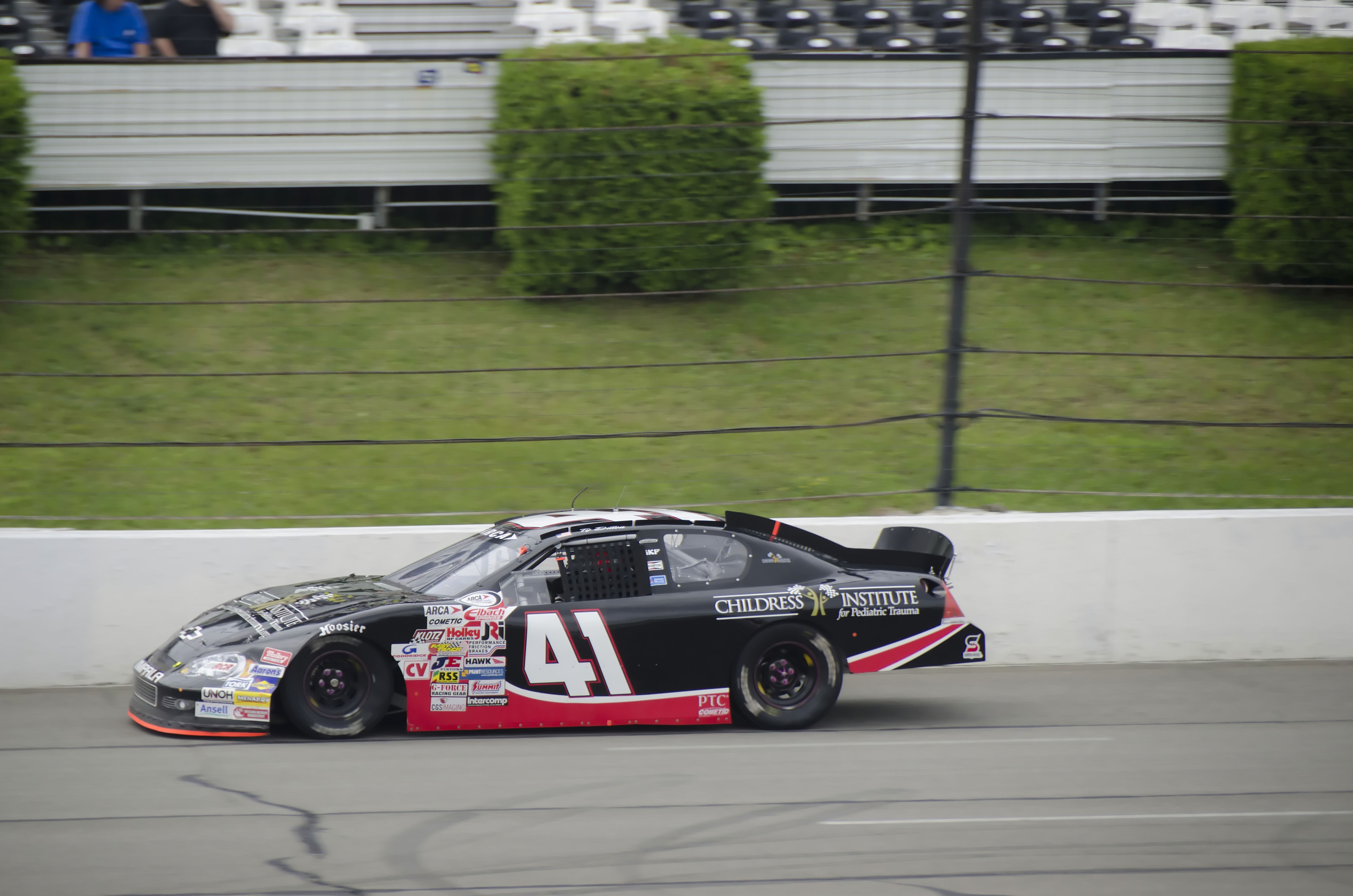
Ty Dillon in the No. 41 at Pocono Raceway in 2011

RCR fielded a 31 car in the ARCA Racing Series in 2006, with Kevin Harvick Incorporated driver Burney Lamar running three races and RCR development driver Timothy Peters running one. The car returned in 2007 in six races, with Peters, Alex Yontz, and Tim McCreadie, scoring three top-ten finishes.

In 2008, Austin Dillon ran the full Camping World East Series schedule in the No. 3 Garage Equipment Supply Chevrolet. Initially driving for Andy Santerre Motorsports, Dillon moved under the RCR umbrella after four races. Dillon scored a win in his series debut at Greenville-Pickens Speedway (after Peyton Sellers winning car was disqualified) and finished second in points. Dillon also ran a single ARCA Racing Series event at Rockingham Speedway, finishing seventh in the No. 31 Chevrolet.

The 3 car ran five East Series races in 2009 sponsored by longtime RCR partner Mom N' Pops, with Austin Dillon running two races and brother Ty Dillon running three. Ryan Gifford ran four races in the East Series in the 29 Shell/Pennzoil Chevrolet with three top-tens, and made one start in the West Series. Austin also ran three ARCA races in the No. 31, with two second-place finishes. Kyle Grissom, son of Steve Grissom, drove the car at Rockingham to a 16th-place finish.

Ty Dillon ran eight of the ten K&N East Series races in 2010, scoring a win at Gresham Motorsports Park. Dillon also ran three ARCA races, scoring two victories in the No. 41 Chevrolet. The team also fielded the No. 31 Chevy full-time in ARCA for Tim George Jr., finishing 9th in points with five top 10 finishes. Dillon moved full-time in the ARCA Series in 2011 along with George Jr. Dillon won the ARCA championship with an impressive seven wins and seven poles. George improved to 7th in points and scored a weather-shortened win at Pocono.

In October 2026, it was revealed that Cleetus McFarland will drive the No. 33 full-time in the ARCA Menards Series in 2027.

== Partnerships and affiliations ==
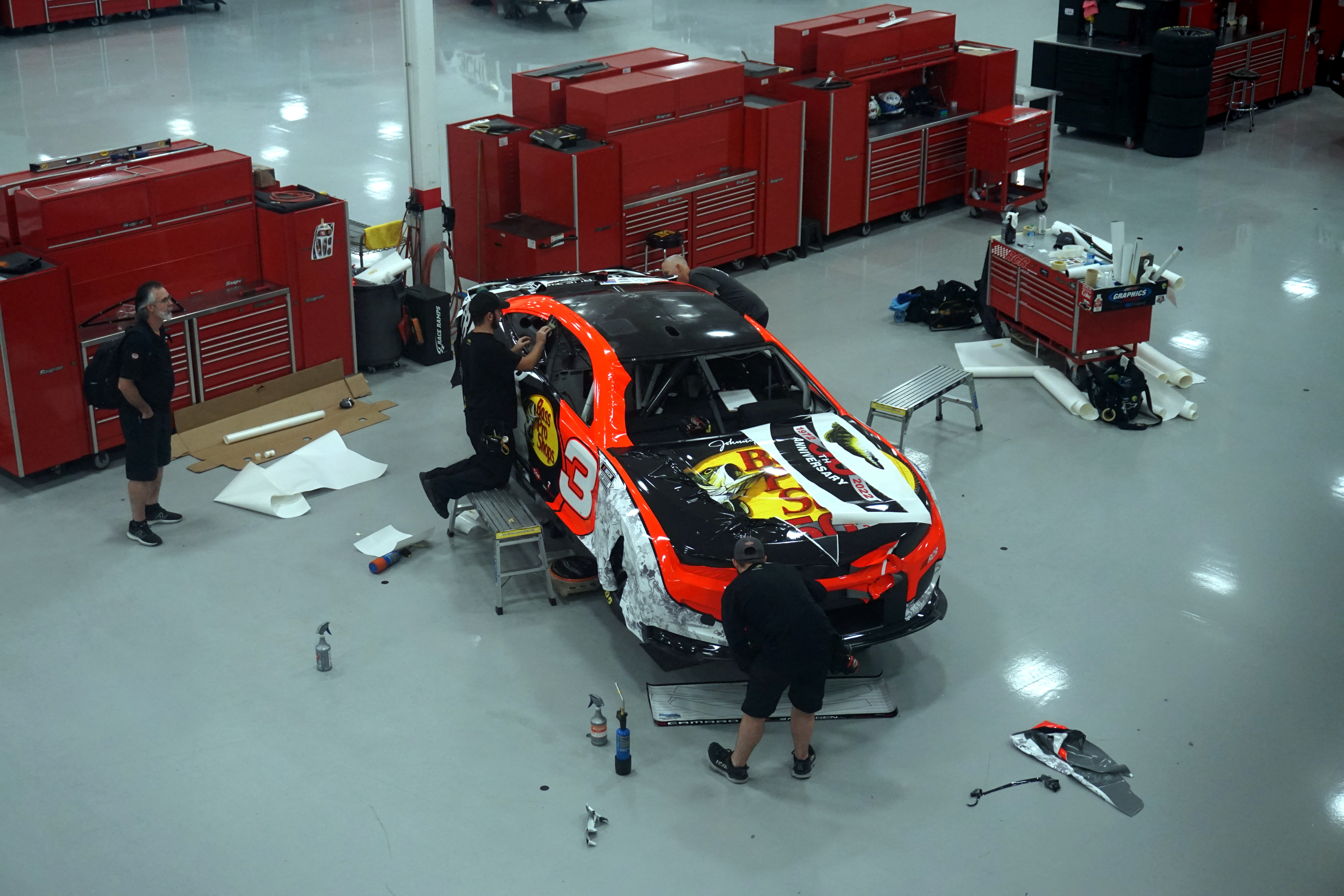
Richard Childress Racing shop in October 2022

=== ECR Engines ===
ECR Engines, also known as ECR Technologies and formerly Earnhardt-Childress Racing Technologies, is the engine department for Richard Childress Racing, located on the RCR campus in Welcome, North Carolina. The company builds Chevrolet engines for RCR and several teams in the NASCAR Cup Series, O’Reilly Series, Truck Series, and ARCA Racing Series. It also produced engines for all Cadillac DPi-V.Rs in the IMSA WeatherTech SportsCar Championship series from years 2017-2022. Current ECR clients include Beard Motorsports, Trackhouse Racing, Our Motorsports, Jordan Anderson Racing and Big Machine Racing Team. Former clients included Furniture Row Racing, Wayne Taylor Racing, JTG Daugherty Racing, Tommy Baldwin Racing, Leavine Family Racing, StarCom Racing, Germain Racing, Richard Petty Motorsports, Legacy Motor Club, Action Express Racing, Chip Ganassi Racing, JDC–Miller MotorSports, Juncos Racing, and Kaulig Racing.

The partnership was formed in May 2007 as a cooperation between Dale Earnhardt, Inc. and Richard Childress Racing to develop and build common engines for the Chevrolet NASCAR Cup Series and O’Reilly Series teams campaigned by the two companies. The partnership was inherited in 2008 by Earnhardt Ganassi Racing, following the merger between DEI and Chip Ganassi Racing. At the time, the Nationwide Series (now O’Reilly Series) and Truck Series engine departments were located at the DEI facility in Mooresville. The company is now known as ECR Engines, no longer connected with DEI or CGR. In 2016, the company became a wholly owned subsidiary of RCR.

While ECR Engines is primarily a Chevrolet manufacturer, it will build engines for Dodge in the Cup Series in 2027.

ECR Engines has secured eight straight IMSA WeatherTech SportsCar Engine Manufacturers Championships from 2012 - 2018 with five overall wins at the Rolex 24 At Daytona in years 2014, 2017–2020.

=== Technical alliances ===
RCR also holds technical alliances with several teams, including Our Motorsports, Jordan Anderson Racing, Alpha Prime Racing, Big Machine Racing Team, Viking Motorsports in the O'Reilly Auto Parts Series. Under these relationships, RCR provides engines, equipment, and technical support. RCR's first alliance model was started in 1997 as RAD (Richard, Andy, and Dale) Racing engines, an aerodynamics program shared with DEI and Andy Petree Racing. The Alliance concluded midway into 2004, when Petree shut down his team.

RCR previously held a successful alliance with Furniture Row Racing, JTG Daugherty Racing, Leavine Family Racing, GMS Racing, Germain Racing, Richard Petty Motorsports, StarCom Racing, and Kaulig Racing.

In 2021, RCR and Hendrick Motorsports will formalize a joint venture focused on engine R&D and the establishment of a common Chevrolet engine specification. The effort will be led by Jeff Andrews of Hendrick Motorsports and Richie Gilmore of RCR and be referred to as HCD (Hendrick Childress Development).

== Sponsorships ==
RCR has had numerous sponsor relationships over the years. From 1988 to 2007, Goodwrench GM Certified Service was a primary sponsor, finally ending its sponsorship in 2007. Starting in 2001, Cingular Wireless began a four-year sponsorship with RCR, which led to a sponsorship controversy after Cingular was merged with AT&T. Starting in 2001, The Hershey Company became an RCR sponsor with its candy brands such as Reese's Fast Break, Hershey's Kissables, Ice Breakers candy and Reese's Peanut Butter Cups Big Cup.

=== Sponsorship controversies ===
Following the 2007 Daytona 500, the paint scheme of Kevin Harvick's winning No. 29 car infuriated NASCAR fuel supplier Sunoco, particularly the large Shell Oil logos on the car and team uniforms. Harvick had also worn his Shell firesuit during the Busch Series race he won the day before. Sunoco believed its exclusive rights to provide fuel to the sport also gave them exclusive marketing rights to gasoline, with other companies' limited to marketing secondary products such as motor oil. The 29 team altered its paint scheme the following week with smaller Shell decals, and larger emphasis of co-sponsor Pennzoil. It is to note that Sunoco sponsored Billy Hagan's race team from 1989 to 1992 with Sterling Marlin and Terry Labonte while Unocal 76 was the fuel supplier. Shell/Pennzoil remains in the sport with Team Penske's No. 22.

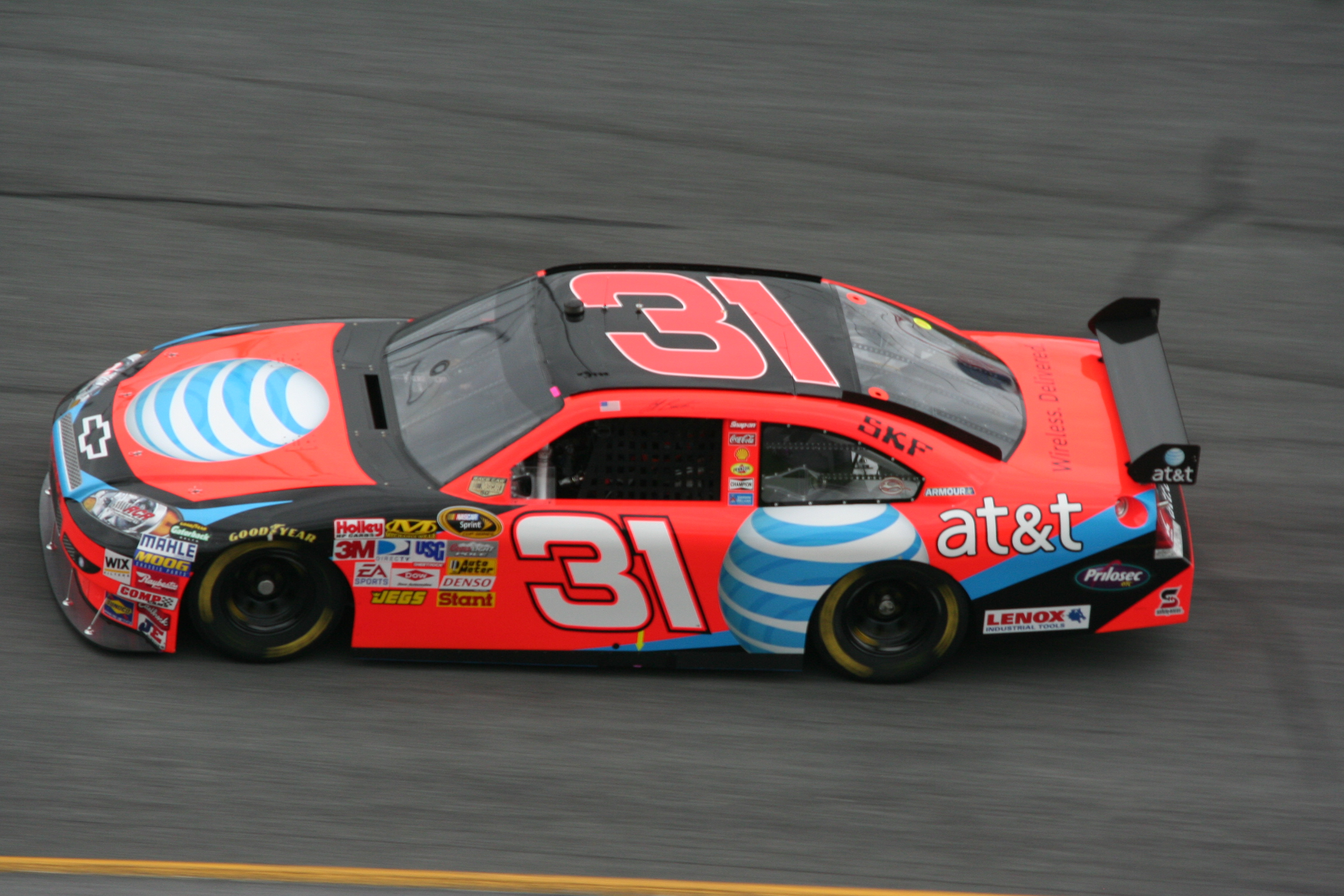
The 31 car with AT&T logos at Daytona in 2008

Meanwhile, AT&T had repeatedly requested that NASCAR allow them to advertise the AT&T Mobility brand on the No. 31 car following their merger with Cingular Wireless, but NASCAR refused to allow it, citing the Sprint Nextel contract. Cingular and Alltel (the sponsor of Team Penske's No. 12) had been grandfathered in when Nextel entered the sport in 2004, with the drivers wearing white Nextel Cup Series logos on their fire suits, but the change in ownership of the former led Sprint to contest the sponsorship. After trying and failing to get NASCAR to approve the addition of the globe logo to the rear of the car, AT&T filed a lawsuit against NASCAR on March 16, 2007. On May 18, a federal judge ruled that AT&T should be allowed to replace the Cingular logos with AT&T logos, and said that AT&T was likely to win the lawsuit. The AT&T logo ran on the No. 31 at the NASCAR Nextel Cup All-Star Challenge on May 19 and every race afterwards until NASCAR ordered the sponsorship off before the 2007 Sharpie 500. RCR and Jeff Burton went a step further, with Burton showing up in a logo-less firesuit, and the black and orange car ran without Cingular or AT&T logos. A settlement before the Chevy Rock and Roll 400 was made where AT&T Mobility could sponsor the car until the end of 2008.

== See also ==
- Childress Vineyards
