= Peanut butter cup =

Chocolate-coated peanut butter confection

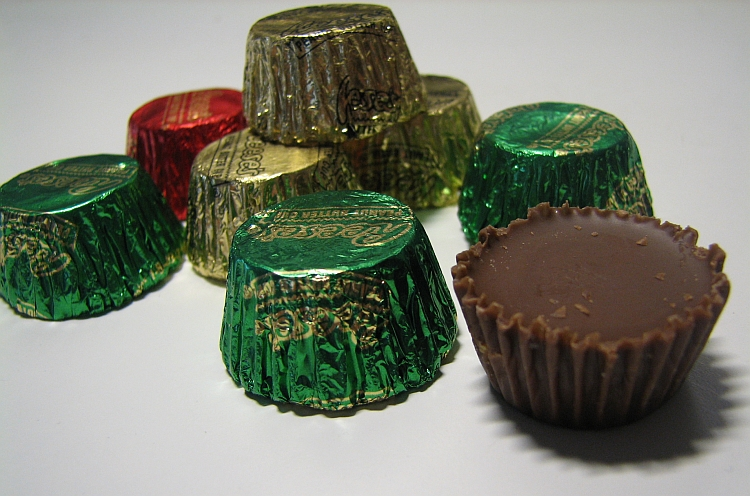
- Picture of peanut butter cups
- Type: Candy
- Place of origin: United States
- Created by: H. B. Reese
- Main ingredients: Chocolate (usually milk chocolate), peanut butter

A peanut butter cup is a molded chocolate with a peanut butter filling. Peanut butter cups are one of the most popular kinds of candy in America. They can be made at home, but like most candies, they are commonly mass-produced. They may also be available in candy shops, produced by local or regional candymakers.

The diameter, thickness, and the relative proportion of its two major components vary according to the desires of the maker. Any type of chocolate may be used for the shell, but milk chocolate is most common. Fillings are usually smooth, creamy peanut butter, but crunchy peanut butter, or peanut butter mixed with other flavors, are also used.

== Brands ==
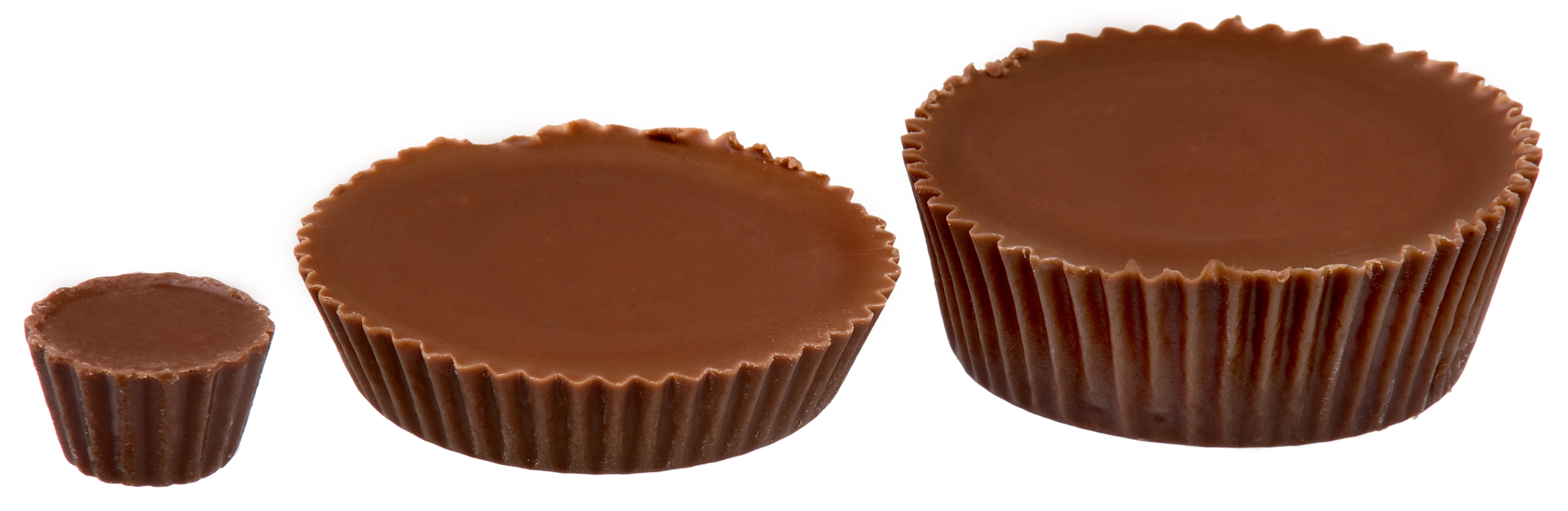
Three different sizes of Reese's peanut butter cups

The most popular brand of peanut butter cup is the Reese's Peanut Butter Cups (sold as Reese in Canada), always featuring Hershey's chocolate, and now a Hershey brand. The heavily roasted peanuts are a trademark flavor. The Reese's Peanut Butter Cup is considered the "finest creation" of Harry Burnett "H. B." Reese, a former employee of Hershey's, who set up his own candy-manufacturing business in the 1920s. Ironically, peanut butter cups were not Reese's favorite candy. He did, however, claim that he owned a trademark on the name "peanut butter cups" and repeatedly threatened legal action against other manufacturers and sellers who made peanut butter cups. Originally sold in bulk, sales of their individual "penny cups" began in 1941, in response to sugar rationing during WWII. The famous slogan "Two great tastes that taste great together" originated in a marketing campaign for this candy in the late 1960s and early 1970s.

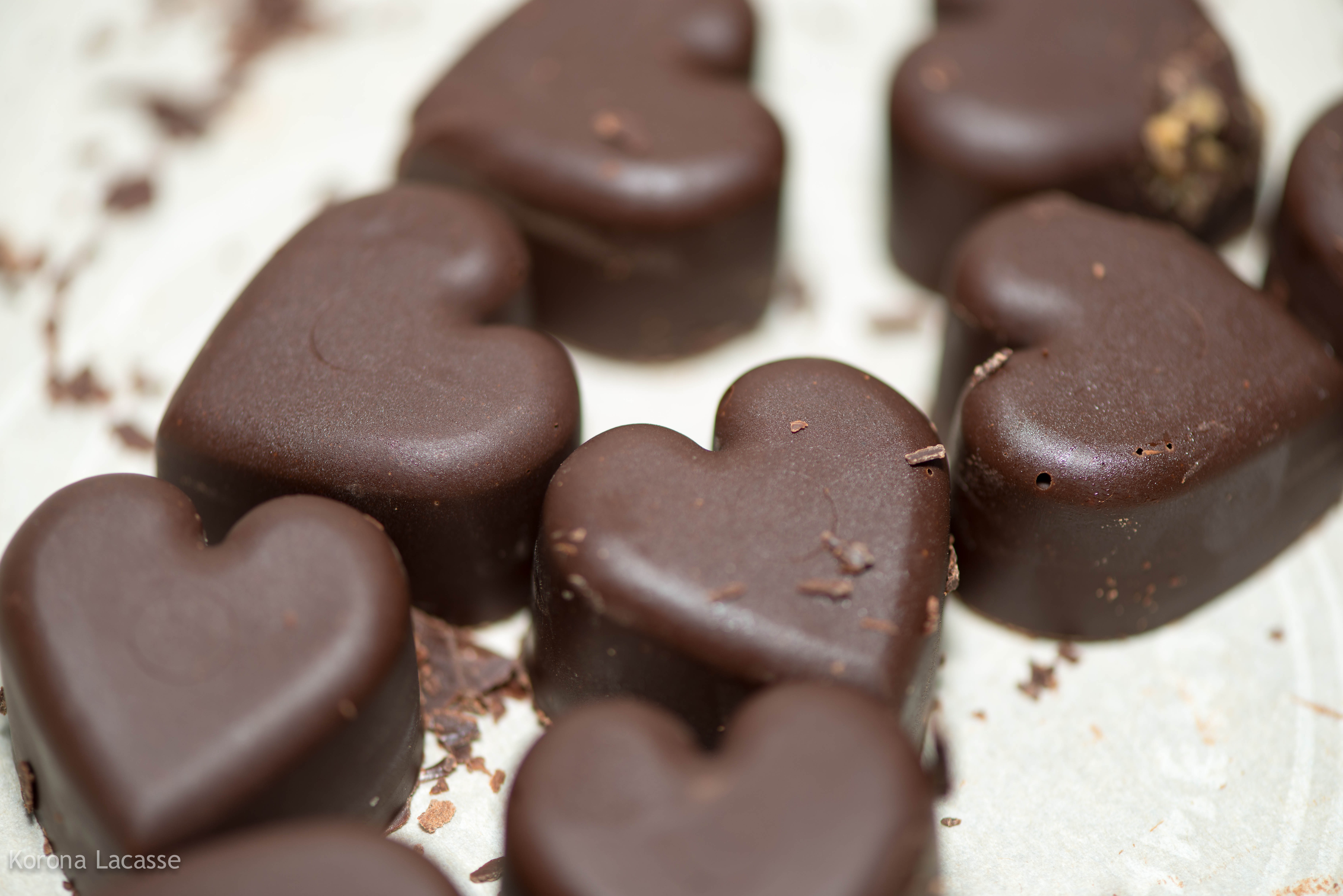
Heart-shaped peanut butter cups

Another brand is Palmer, which specializes in holiday-themed peanut butter cups. There are various forms that the peanut butter cups take for the different seasons. Each holiday has a different color of foil for the season. They can also come in different shapes, such as hearts or Christmas trees, during holiday seasons.

Many regional candy companies also have versions of the peanut butter cup, including Boyer Candies in Altoona, Pennsylvania.

== Variations ==
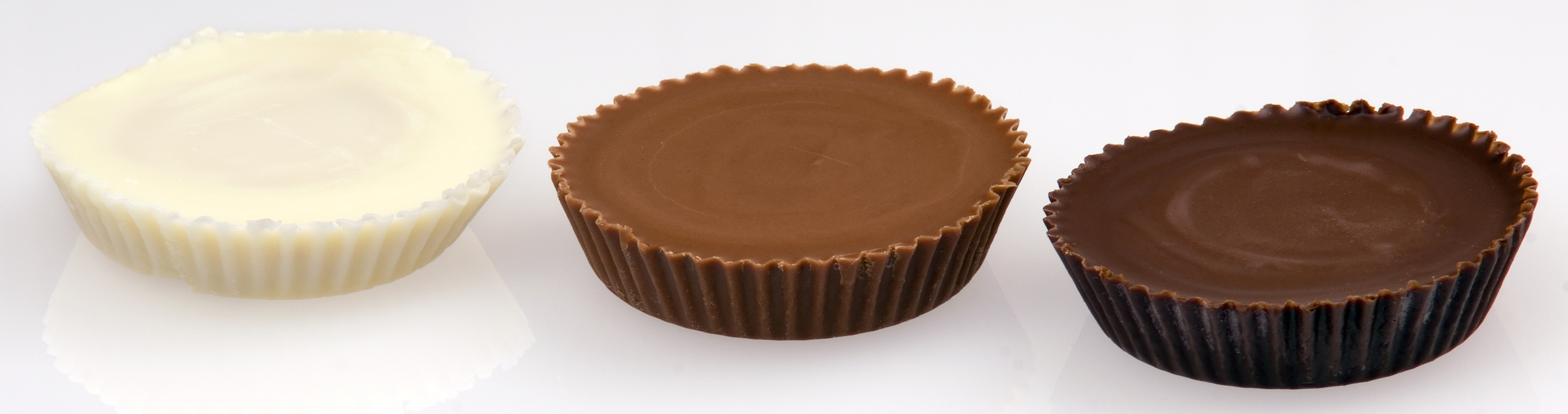
Peanut butter cups made with white, milk, and dark chocolate

Peanut butter cups are made with different variations, such as using white chocolate, dark chocolate, or chocolate-flavored peanut filling. The first variation marketed by Reese's used crunchy peanut butter in 1976. Some have been one-time thematic variations, such as Reese's banana-flavored Elvis Special Edition in 2007.

== See also ==
- Russell Stover Candies
- Buckeye candy
- List of peanut dishes
