= Snack Barz =

Candy bar by The Hershey Company

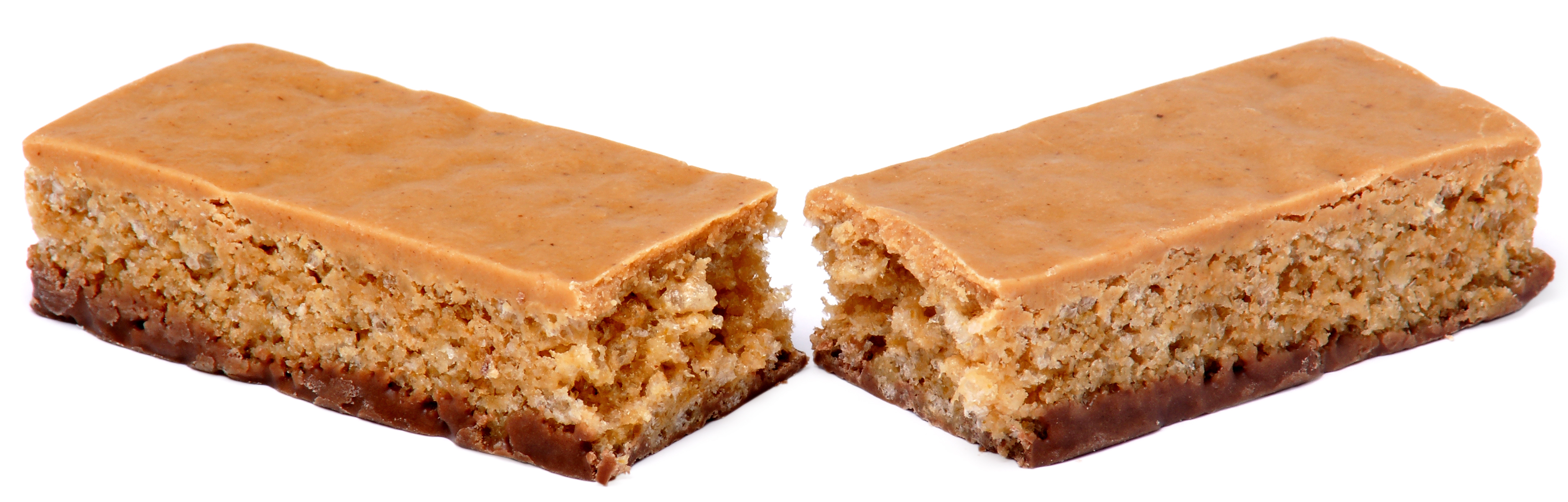
- A Reese's Snack Barz Bar
- Product type: Chocolate Bar
- Current owner: The Hershey Company
- Produced by: The H.B. Reese Candy Company, a division of The Hershey Company
- Country: United States
- Introduced: February 2004
- Related brands: Reese's Peanut Butter Cups; Take 5 (candy); NutRageous; Reese's Fast Break

Hershey's Snack Barz is a brand of candy bar produced, marketed, and sold by The Hershey Company.

Snack Barz are a combination of crisped rice held together with marshmallow and reinforced with a coating of Hershey's milk chocolate.

== Flavors and varieties ==
In 2004, The Hershey Company released three flavors of Snack Barz: Hershey's Chocolate Creme, Reese's Peanut Butter, and Hershey's S'mores Marshmallow Creme. Later, the company began manufacturing and distributing two new flavors of Snack Barz in 2005: Caramel and Cookies 'n Creme.

== Product ==
Hershey's Snack Bars are manufactured, packaged, and sold by The Hershey Company. The Snack Barz are made of two layers of a crispy rice and marshmallow mixture. In between these two "rice and marshmallow bars", a "creamy" marshmallow layer is added in between the two pieces to help the layers stick together. The end product is dipped in Hershey's chocolate before it is packaged and boxed.

Snack Barz are sold in 1.5 and 2.1 ounce bar sizes. Each 1.5 ounce Snack Bar sells for about 70 cents, while each 2.1 ounce Snack Bar sells for about US$1.05 a bar.

== Advertising ==
Hershey's Snack Bars are advertised as being a healthier candy bar (as compared with traditional candy) as well as having zero grams of trans fat and being a good source of calcium, iron, and "seven essential vitamins" (one bar has about fifteen percent of the Recommended Dietary Allowance of them). For these reasons, when the product was first released The Hershey Company aimed much of their marketing at parents concerned about the health of their children.
