= List of top-selling candy brands =

The table below summarizes some of the top-selling candy brands in different countries. Candy is a confection that features sugar as a principal ingredient. The category, called sugar confectionery, encompasses any sweet confection, including chocolate, chewing gum, and sugar candy. Vegetables, fruit, or nuts which have been glazed and coated with sugar are said to be candied.

== Top-selling chocolates and sweets ==
Country	Brand	Image	2012 annual sales (millions USD)	Notes
United States	Reese's Peanut Butter Cups		2,603	Reese's Peanut Butter Cups are the No. 1 selling candy brand in the United States, consisting of white fudge, milk, or dark chocolate cups filled with peanut butter. They were invented by H.B. Reese after he founded the H. B. Reese Candy Company in 1923. Initially working from the basement of his Hershey, Pennsylvania home, Reese's success eventually allowed him to build two modern factories. Reese died on May 16, 1956, in West Palm Beach, Florida, leaving the company to his six sons. On July 2, 1963, the H. B. Reese Candy Company merged with the Hershey Chocolate Corporation in a tax free stock-for-stock merger. In 2026 after 63 years of stock splits, the original 666,316 shares of Hershey common stock received by the Reese brothers represent 16 million Hershey shares valued at over $4.4 billion that pay annual cash dividends of $92.9 million. In 1969, six years after the Reese/Hershey merger, Reese's Peanut Butter Cups became The Hershey Company's top seller.
United States	M&M's		2,300	Mars Incorporated owns M&M's which are "colorful button-shaped chocolates" consisting of a hard candy shell surrounding a filling that differs depending on the variety, each of which has the letter "m" printed in lower case on one side. In 1940, M&M Limited was founded in Newark, New Jersey. The name "M&Ms" stands for Mars and Murrie, which were the last names of the two company founders, Forrest Mars Sr. and Bruce Murrie (who owned 20% of M&M Limited). Murrie was the son of Hershey Chocolate president William F. R. Murrie. This arrangement allowed M&M's to be made with Hershey Chocolate, as Hershey had control of rationed chocolate during World War II.
United Kingdom	Cadbury's Dairy Milk		852	Cadbury's Dairy Milk is a chocolate bar that claims to have a glass and a half of milk in every bar. This chocolate treat was created in 1904 and became an instant hit following its initial sales in 1905. Cadbury was bought out by Kraft Foods in 2010.
Germany	Milka		733	Milka is milk chocolate that is manufactured by the Mondelēz International (formerly Kraft Foods) Company. It was first created in 1901. The candy's packaging includes a lilac-colored cow.
Brazil	Trident		682	Trident, made by Cadbury, is not only the No. 1 candy in Brazil, it is also the No. 1 brand of chewing gum in the world.
Japan	Meiji		479	Meiji chocolate is manufactured by Meiji Seika Kaisha Ltd., which was established in 1916 and is located in Tokyo. Meiji chocolates flavors include cheese, black pepper, jasmine, basil, and lemon salt.
Russia	Orbit Gum		445	Orbit gum first got its name during the Second World War when Wrigley shipped all of their chewing gum overseas to the troops and began manufacturing gum for the civilians under the name of Orbit. After the war, the name Orbit disappeared again. In the 1970s, Wrigley began selling sugar-free gum under the name of Orbit in European countries. It was not until 2001 that Orbit gum returned to the United States.
Finland	Fazer Blue		443	Fazer Blue chocolate (200g) by Fazer is the most sold candy in Finland.
France	Hollywood		318	Hollywood Chewing Gum was the first French chewing gum, and it was created in 1952. The French were introduced to chewing gum for the first time by the American troops stationed there in 1944. In 1958, the gum's main advertising focus was that of the American Dream. While Hollywood now offers a variety of different flavors, the very first flavor was spearmint.
Italy	Vivident Gum		313	Vivident is a sugar-free gum that is manufactured by the Perfetti Van Melle Group and is wildly popular in Italy. Advertisements for the gum has been claimed to be behind the gum's popularity.
China	Hsu Fu Chi		256	The Hsu Fu Chi company started in 1992 with brothers by the name of Hsu. The company makes a wide variety of candy, including lollipops, gummies, jelly beans, chocolates, and pastries. The company was bought out by Nestle in 2011.
Russia	Alpen Gold		198	Alpen Gold is a brand of chocolate produced in Russia. They sell chocolate bars, pralines, and boxes of chocolates. Their chocolate often includes ingredients such as raisins, nuts, and liqueur.
Australia	Cadbury's Dairy Milk		197	Cadbury's Dairy Milk is a chocolate bar that claims to have a glass and a half of milk in every bar. This chocolate treat was created in 1904 and became an instant hit following its initial sales in 1905.
Czech Republic	Orion		142	Production of Orion chocolate began in 1896 as a part of a small family business in Prague. The chocolate became very popular, representing one-third of the chocolate produced in the Czech Republic. In 1991, Nestlé took over Orion chocolate, which has only helped boost the popularity of the candy.
India	Cadbury's Dairy Milk		127	Cadbury's Dairy Milk is a chocolate bar that claims to have a glass and a half of milk in every bar. This chocolate treat was created in 1904 and became an instant hit following its initial sales in 1905.
Argentina	TopLine gum		124	TopLine gum is manufactured by a company by the name of Arcor, which was started in 1951.
Chile	Ambrosoli		102	Ambrosoli is the largest candy manufacturer in Chile. The company produces a wide variety of candies, including jelly and hard candy.
Israel	Elite		93	Elite candy is manufactured by the Strauss Group and includes a variety of different types of candies.
South Africa	Beacon Sweets and Chocolates		69	Candy manufactured by the Beacon Sweets and Chocolates company is the top-selling candy in South Africa. They produce a wide variety of candies, including gummies, jelly candy, chocolate, and more.
Colombia	Jet		47	Jet chocolate bars are produced by Compania Nacional de Chocolates. The candy was first manufactured in the 1960s.
