= Eat-More =

Chocolate bar

- Product type: Confectionery
- Current owner: The Hershey Company (1987)
- Country: Canada
- Previous owners: Lowney Company; Nabisco

Eat-More is a candy bar made by Hershey. It consists of dark toffee, peanuts, and unsweetened chocolate. It was created in Canada by the Lowney company, which was acquired by Hershey Canada on July 1st, 1987 from Nabisco Ltd. An early 1930s contest to name the candy bar was won by Angus B. MacDonald of New Waterford, Cape Breton Island, Nova Scotia; his prize was an art deco-style clock fashioned to look like a measuring tape.

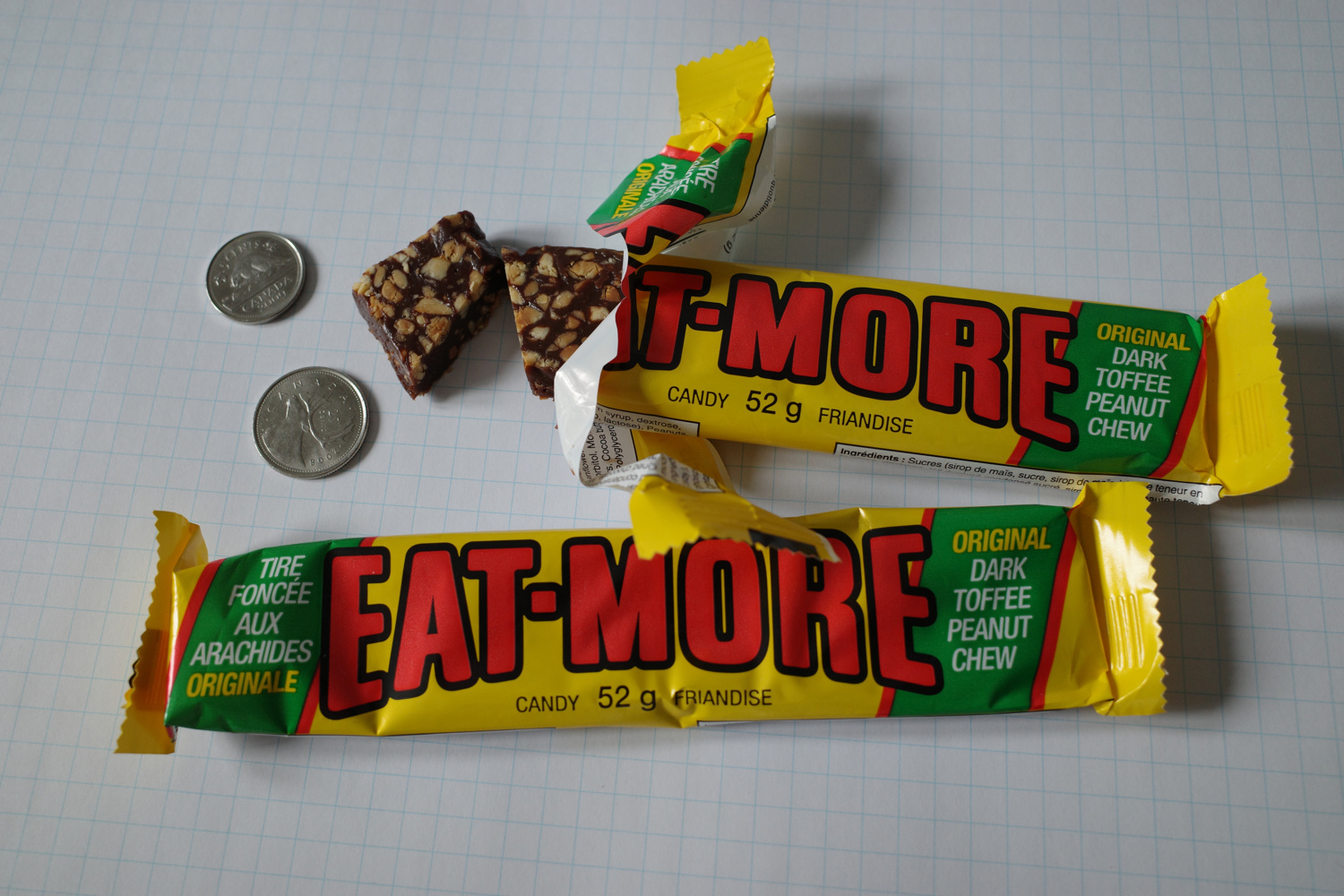
Two Eat-More candy bars, in 52g size. One has been opened and cut to show internal structure. A nickel and quarter are included to show scale.

It is chewy and comes in a yellow, red, and green wrapper. It is also rectangular and flat, and "stretches" when eaten.

A caramel version was also launched in 1995 which replaced the dark toffee of the original with caramel of similar consistency. It was the same size and shape as the original Eat-More, but it came in a copper-coloured wrapper. The caramel version has since been discontinued.

== See also ==
- List of chocolate bar brands
- List of the Hershey Company brands
