= Ditchley, Virginia =

Unincorporated community in Virginia, US

Coordinates: 37°43′59″N 76°19′28″W

Ditchley is an unincorporated community in Northumberland County, in the U.S. state of Virginia.
