= Whatchamacallit (candy) =

Crisped rice candy bar

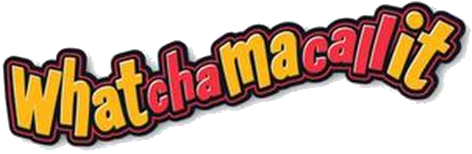

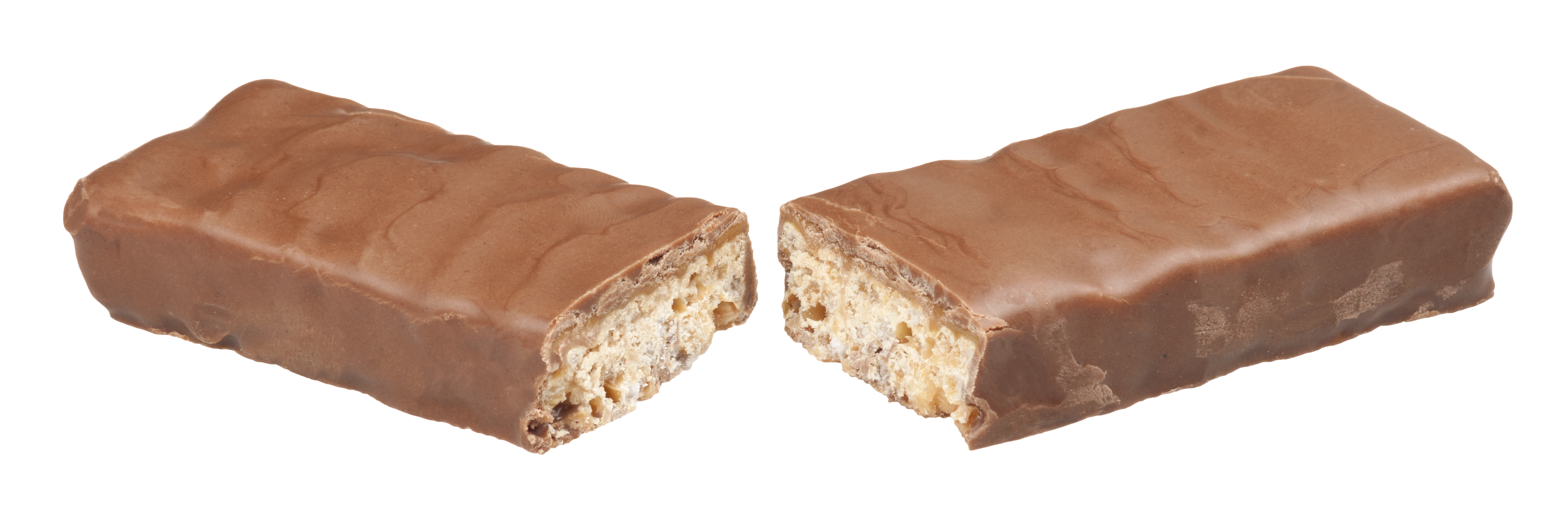
- A candy bar with peanut butter crisp covered in chocolate.
- Product type: Crisped rice candy bar
- Current owner: The Hershey Company
- Produced by: The Hershey Company
- Country: U.S.
- Introduced: 1978; 48 years ago
- Related brands: WHOZEEWHATZIT
- Markets: U.S.
- Tagline: You Can Ask For it By Name
- Website: hersheyland.com/whatchamacallit

Whatchamacallit (also called the WHATCHAMACALLIT) is a chocolate candy bar marketed in the United States by The Hershey Company.

== History ==
Whatchamacallit bars were first introduced in 1978. The name was devised by Patricia Volk, the writer of STUFFED: Adventures of a Restaurant Family, when she was the associate creative director at Doyle Dane & Bernbach, and was in charge of new brands on the Hershey account. From 1978 to 1987, Whatchamacallit consisted of a bar of peanut-flavored crisp that utilized peanut butter as the flavoring agent, coated in a thin layer of chocolate. In 1987 a layer of caramel was added. Hershey's Whatchamacallit is found in recipes for various food items, including pies, cookies, cheesecakes, and cupcakes.

The advertising for the Whatchamacallit peaked in the 1980s; after this period Hershey Company ran noticeably fewer advertisements for this product. However, despite the lack of attention the company gives it compared to its other products, the Whatchamacallit is still in production as of 2026.

In Canada, an identical chocolate bar was marketed by Hershey's as Special Crisp, but did not have the wide distribution in Canada that the Whatchamacallit has in the United States.

== Ingredient changes ==
In 2008 the Hershey Company began to change the ingredients for some of its products, replacing the relatively expensive cocoa butter with cheaper oil substitutes. Such cost-cutting was done to reduce production costs and avoid price increases for its products.

Hershey's changed the description of the product and altered the packaging slightly along with the ingredients. Though the new formula still contains chocolate, according to United States Food and Drug Administration food labeling laws, products that do not contain cocoa butter cannot legally be described as milk chocolate; instead, such products are often referred to as chocolate candy.

== Thingamajig ==
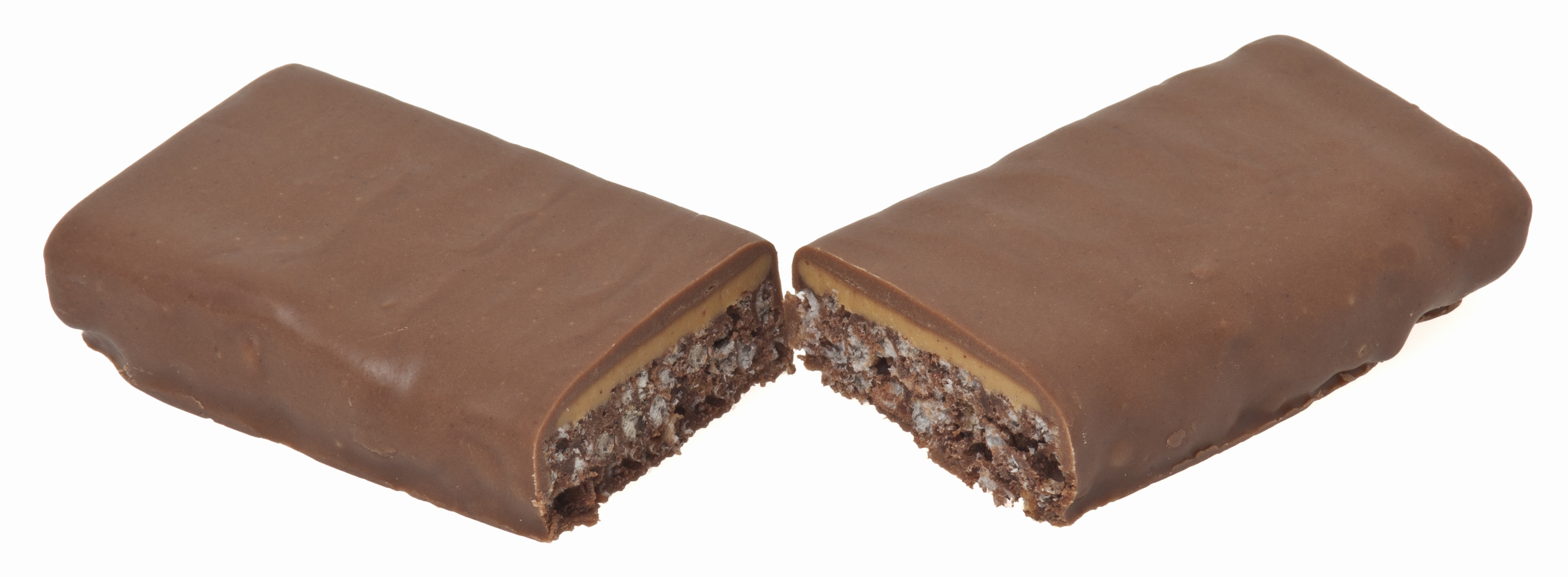
Thingamajig is a similar rice-crisp and peanut-butter candy bar to the Whatchamacallit.

In 2009 Hershey's introduced Thingamajig, featuring chocolate, cocoa crisps, and peanut butter inside. It was reintroduced in late 2011 on a supposedly permanent basis. However, as of 2012, according to Hershey's Chocolate World in Pennsylvania, the Thingamajig candy bar is no longer being produced.

== Whozeewhatzit ==
In 2021 Hershey's unveiled the Whozeewhatzit (also called the WHOZEEWHATZIT) bar featuring the chocolate, cocoa crisps, crisped rice, and peanut butter ingredients of the Thingamajig bar from 2009. Hershey's held a naming contest for the new bar, with a $5,000 prize for the most creative name, along with a year's supply of the confection. After more than 43,000 entries the Whatchamacallit brand declared the name Whozeewhatzit the winning entry. The Whozeewhatzit wrapper identifies the contest winner: Lisa M. from Framingham, Massachusetts.

== See also ==
- Wotsits
