= Reese's Puffs =

American breakfast cereal

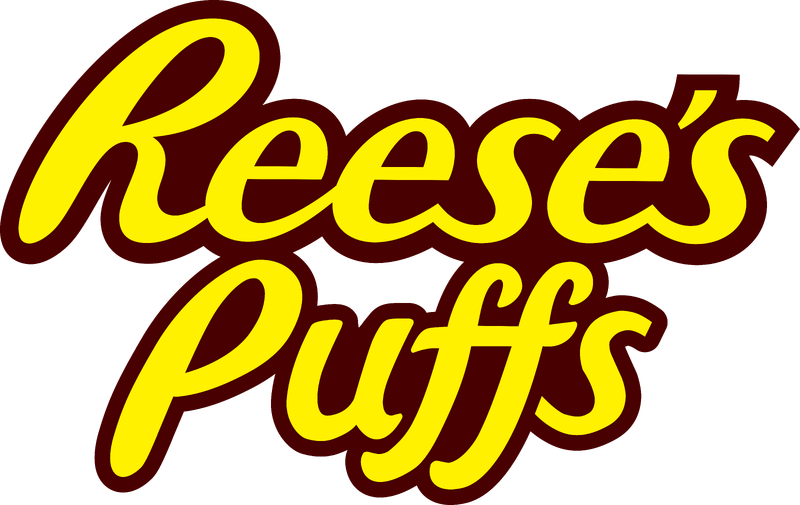

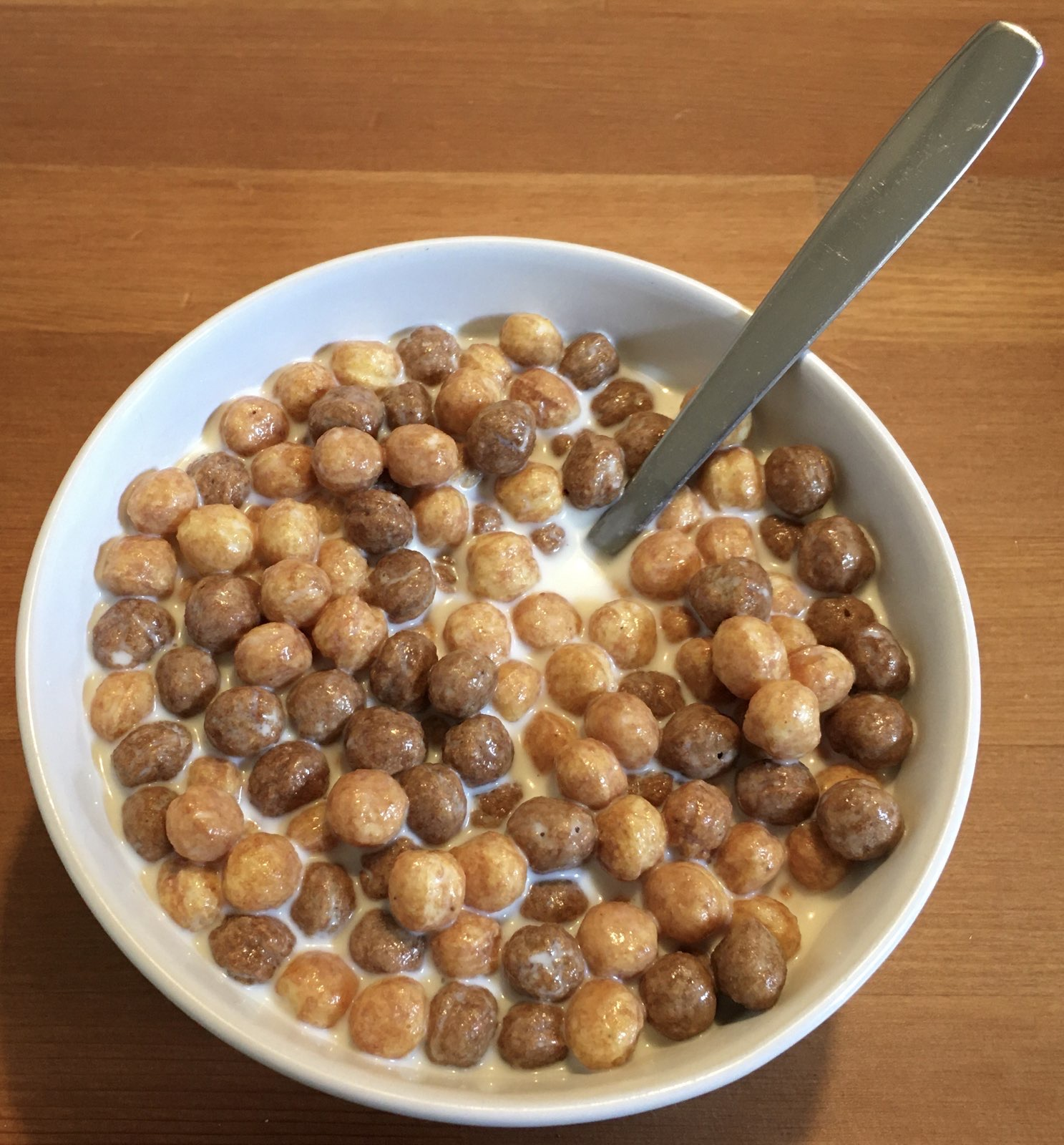
- A bowl of Reese's Puffs with milk
- Product type: Breakfast cereal
- Current owner: General Mills
- Country: United States
- Introduced: 1994; 32 years ago
- Markets: United States, Canada
- Website: Reese's Puffs

Reese's Puffs
Nutritional value per 1 cup (40 g)
- Energy: 690.36 kJ (165.00 kcal)
- Carbohydrates: 30.2 g
- Sugars: 14.1 g
- Dietary fiber: 1.89 g
- Fat: 4.44 g
- Protein: 2.72 g
Vitamins and minerals
Minerals	Quantity %DV^{†}
Calcium	11% 138 mg
Iron	34% 6.2 mg
Magnesium	5% 22 mg
Phosphorus	7% 82.8 mg
Potassium	3% 97.6 mg
Sodium	10% 222 mg
Zinc	47% 5.16 mg
- Other constituents: Quantity
- Caffeine: 1.2 mg
- ^{†}Percentages estimated using US recommendations for adults, except for potassium, which is estimated based on expert recommendation from the National Academies.

Reese's Puffs (formerly Reese's Peanut Butter Puffs) is a corn-based breakfast cereal manufactured by General Mills inspired by Reese's Peanut Butter Cups. At its launch in May 1994 the cereal consisted of corn puffs flavored with chocolate and peanut butter. Later, the formula was revised to be a mixture of chocolate puffs and peanut butter puffs.

Artificial flavours and food coloring were removed in 2015 in response to consumer demand. In 2018, over 35 million boxes were sold, totaling to $121 million in sales.

== Collaboration ==
Atlanta Dream player Angel Reese became an official brand ambassador for Reese's after fans' enthusiasm for the idea. She appears on the Reese's Puffs box holding a basketball. Senior brand manager Melissa Blette said Reese was chosen for her personality and excited fanbase, in addition to her name. General Mills released four different varieties of Reese's Puffs cereal boxes as part of this collaboration.

== Varieties ==
There have been several varieties of Reese's Puffs produced:

- Reese's Puffs Bunnies (2017) (Spring-themed bunny-shaped Reese's Puffs)
- Reese's Puffs Bats (2018) (Halloween themed Bat shaped Reese's Puffs)
- Reese's Puffs Big Puffs (2019) (Large sized Reese's Puffs)
- Reese's Puffs Hearts (2019) (Limited edition Heart shaped Reese's Puffs)
- Reese's Puffs Minis (2023)
- Reese's Puffs Peanut Butter Lovers (2024) (Peanut Butter corn puffs only)
- Dark Chocolate Reese's Puffs (2026)

== See also ==
- Reese's Pieces
