= Hershey's Kissables =

Chocolate candy

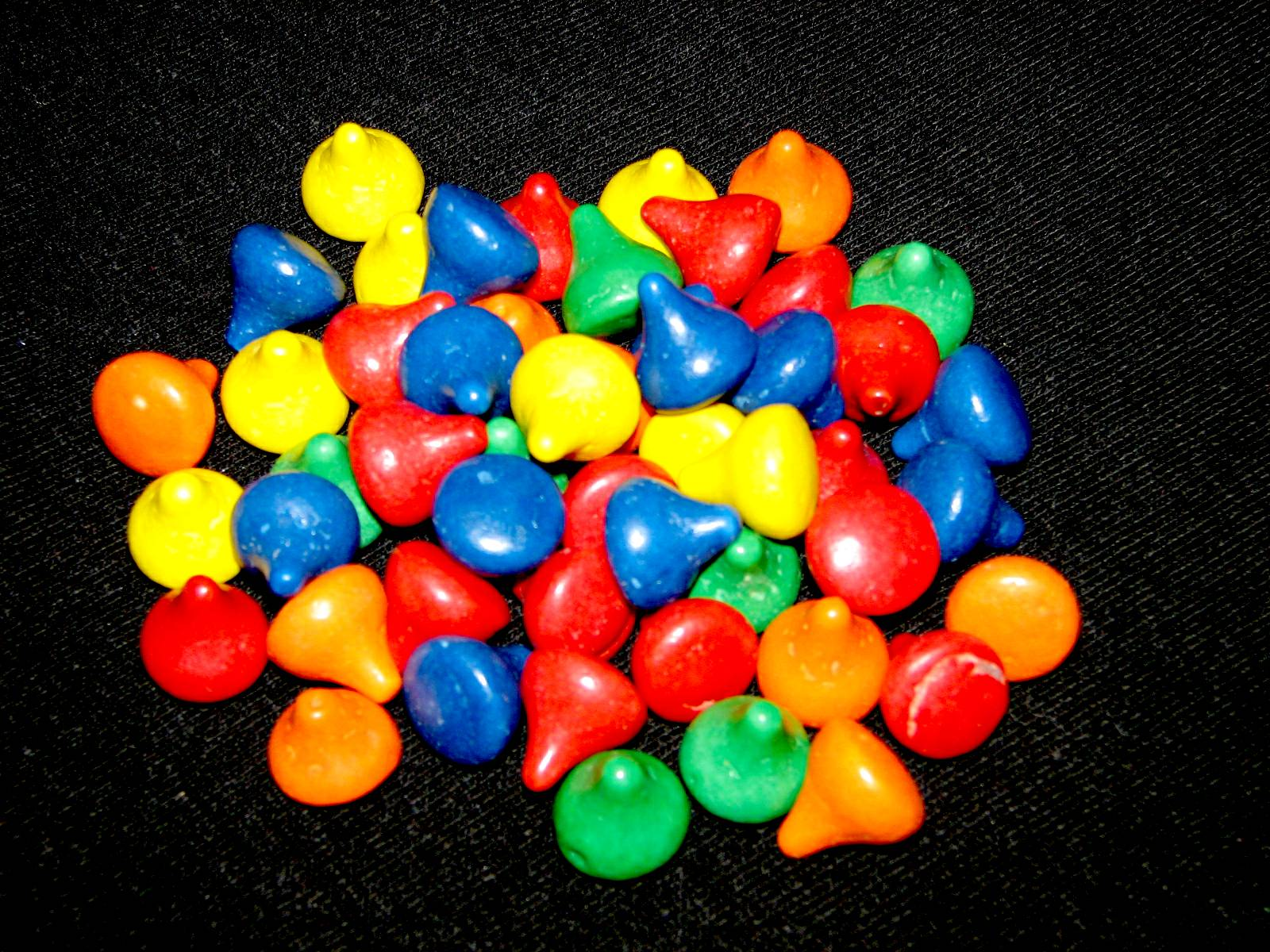
- Product type: Chocolate
- Produced by: The Hershey Company
- Country: United States
- Introduced: November 11, 2005
- Discontinued: July 19, 2009

Hershey's Kissables were a chocolate candy sold by The Hershey Company from November 11, 2005 to July 19, 2009. Comparable to M&M's, Hershey's Kissables were shaped like miniature Hershey's Kisses and were coated in a thick sugar shell.

The basic colors were red, orange, yellow, green and blue. Holiday versions were also made in pastels for Easter, pink and white for Valentines, and red and green for Christmas. In mid-2007, Hershey's introduced a dark chocolate version called Kissables Dark, which featured more subdued colors and a semi-sweet interior.

Kissables were discontinued in July 2009.

== Ingredient changes to reduce production costs ==
In 2007, the Hershey Company began to change the ingredients of some of its products to replace the relatively expensive cocoa butter with cheaper fats. Hershey's changed the description of the product from "candy coated milk chocolate" to "chocolate candy" and altered the packaging and product ingredients. According to United States Food and Drug Administration food labeling laws, these modified recipes could not be legally described as milk chocolate.

The ingredients in 2005 were: milk chocolate (sugar, cocoa butter, chocolate, nonfat milk, milk fat, lactose, soy lecithin, PGPR, and artificial flavors), sugar, red 40, yellow 5, yellow 6, blue 1, and carnauba wax.

In 2007, the ingredients were changed to: Sugar, vegetable oil (palm, shea, sunflower and/or safflower oil), chocolate, nonfat milk, whey, cocoa butter, milk fat, gum arabic, soy lecithin, artificial colors (red 40, yellow 5, blue 2, blue 1, yellow 6), corn syrup, resinous glaze, salt, carnauba wax, PGPR and vanillin.
