= Reese's Peanut Butter Cups =

American candy made by Hershey's

Reese's

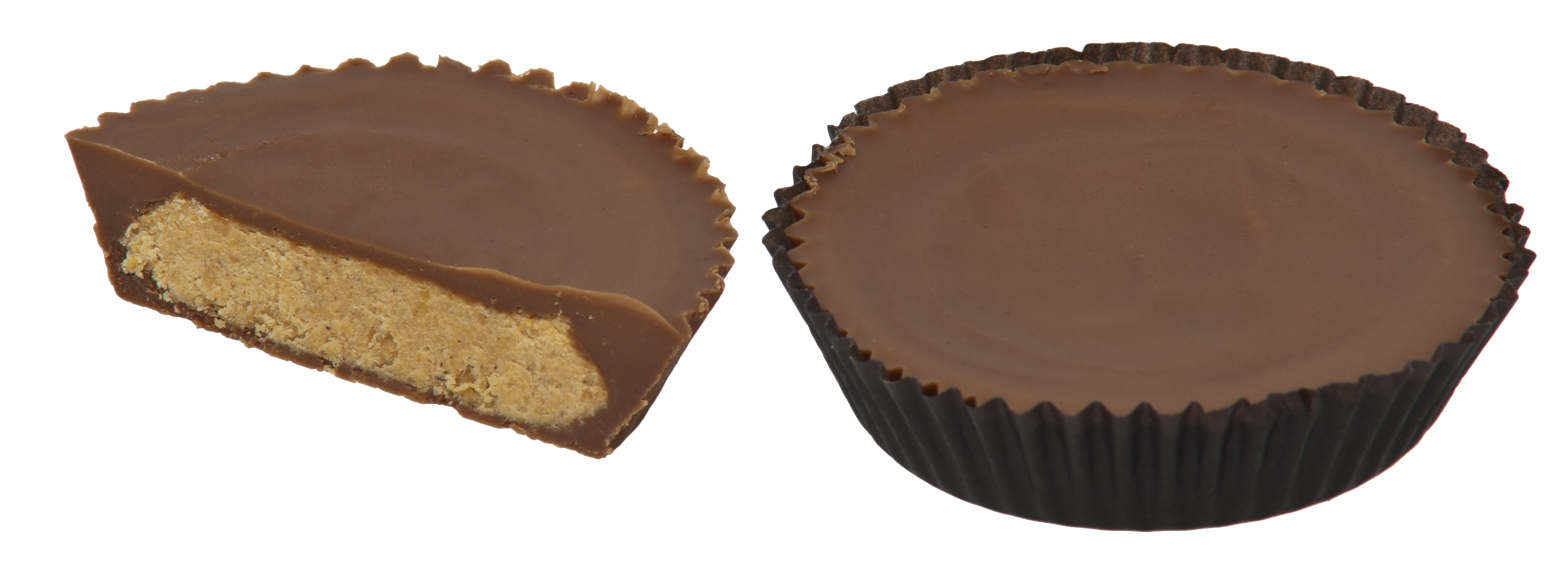
- Reese's Peanut Butter Cup consists of smooth peanut butter filling inside of Hershey's chocolate.
- Product type: Chocolate Peanut Butter
- Current owner: The Hershey Company
- Produced by: The Hershey Company
- Country: United States
- Introduced: November 15, 1928; 97 years ago
- Related brands: Take 5; Reese's Pieces; NutRageous
- Markets: Worldwide
- Previous owners: The H. B. Reese Candy Company; H. B. Reese
- Website: hersheyland.com/reeses

Reese's Peanut Butter Cups (/ˈriːsɪz/, REE-siz) are an American candy by the Hershey Company consisting of a peanut butter filling encased in chocolate. They were created on November 15, 1928, by H. B. Reese, a former dairy farmer and shipping foreman for Milton S. Hershey. Reese was let go from his job with Hershey when the Round Barn, which he managed, was shut down for cost-saving measures in 1919. He subsequently decided to start his own candy business. Reese's are a top-selling candy brand worldwide, with $3.1 billion in annual revenue.

== History ==
The H. B. Reese Candy Company was established in 1923 by H. B. Reese in Hershey, Pennsylvania. The official product name was "Penny Cups" because they could be purchased for one cent. Reese had originally worked at a Hershey dairy farm, and from the start, he used Hershey chocolate in his confections. Reese's Peanut Butter Cups were his most popular candy, leading Reese to eventually discontinue his other lines. Reese died in 1956, passing the company to his six sons, Robert, John, Ed, Ralph, Harry, and Charles Richard Reese. On July 2, 1963, the Reese brothers merged the H. B. Reese Candy Company with the Hershey Chocolate Corporation in a tax-free stock-for-stock merger. In 1969, Reese's Peanut Butter Cups became the Hershey Company's top seller.

The H. B. Reese Candy Company is maintained as a subsidiary of Hershey because the Reese plant workforce is not unionized, unlike the main Hershey plant. In 2012, Reese's was the best-selling candy brand in the United States with sales of $2.603 billion, and was the fourth-best-selling candy brand globally with sales of $2.679 billion—only $76 million (2.8%) of its sales were from outside the United States market. Additionally, the H.B. Reese Candy Company manufactures the Kit Kat in the United States, which had 2012 U.S. sales of $948 million.

As of October 2017, in the U.S. convenience store channel, Reese's was the largest confection brand by far: It was 62% larger than the next brand, with more households purchasing Reese's products than any other confection brand across the United States. Reese's includes the overall top-selling confection item—the Reese's Peanut Butter Cups King Size—as well as six of the top 20 chocolate/non-chocolate items. Additionally, the Reese's brand accounts for over 47% of all seasonal sales within the U.S. convenience store channel, including the top two items in the largest four commercial seasons: Valentine's, Easter, Halloween, and Christmas. As a comparison, the next largest brand accounts for only 10% of seasonal sales. In 2026, the Reese brothers' original 666,316 shares of Hershey common stock represent 16 million Hershey shares valued at over $4.4 billion that pay annual cash dividends of $92.9 million.

In 2026, the grandson of H. B. Reese, Brad Reese, accused Hershey's of changing the formulation of the cups, describing the candy as "not edible"; a corporate spokesperson disputed this, claiming that despite "product recipe adjustments" they were "made the same way they always have been." In March 2026, Hershey's CEO Kirk Tanner confirmed that the company started substituting a "chocolate coating compound" on several of its Reese's products, and will begin to revert to using "classic milk and dark chocolate recipes" in its products by 2027.

== Variations ==
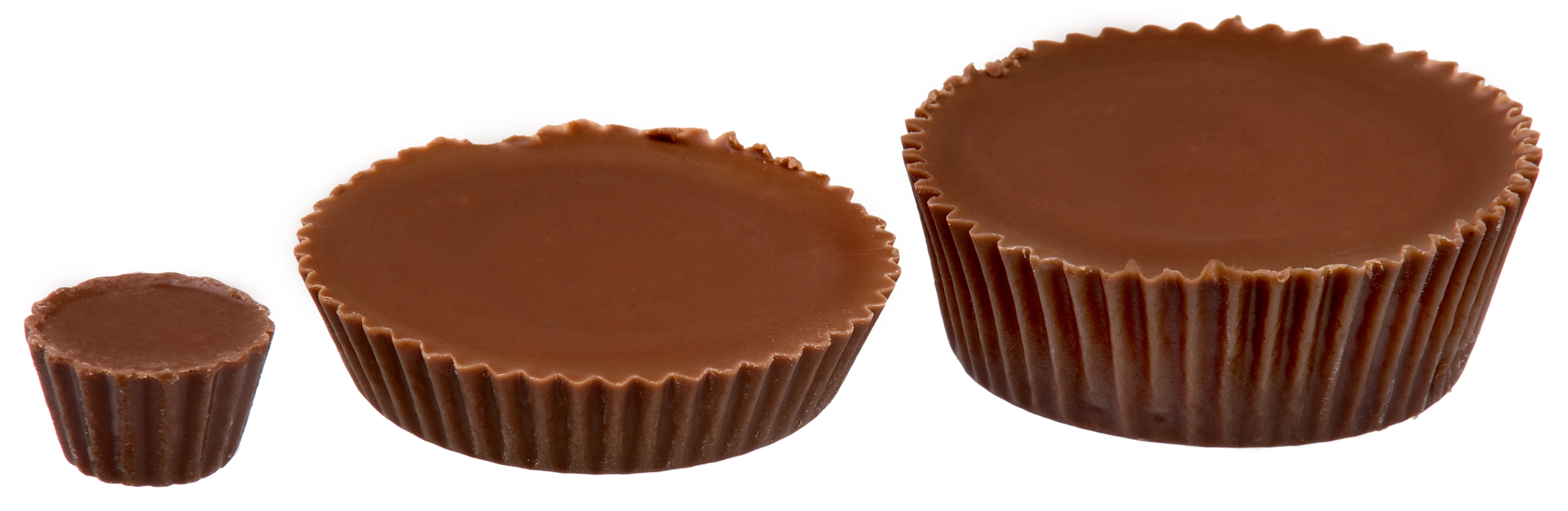
A trio of different sized cups. Starting from the left: mini, regular and big cup.

Hershey's produces variations and "limited editions" of the candy that have included:

Size variations:

- Big Cup: a thicker version of the traditional Reese's Peanut Butter Cup. Introduced in limited editions in 2003 before becoming a permanent fixture of the brand two years later. Has several variations, including potato chips, pretzels, Reese's Pieces, and Reese's Puffs and Caramel and Chocolate lava.
- King Size: Introduced in 1987. Originally 3.2 oz (90.7 g); since 1991, 2.8 oz (79.4 g).
- Miniatures: Bite-size versions weighing 70 g (2.5 oz). Introduced in 1978.
- Thins: 40% thinner than the original cup. Introduced in 2018.
- Sugar Free: same as the original but without sugar. Introduced in 2003.
- World's Largest: each cup weighs 8 oz (226.8 g). Introduced in 2011.

Filling variations:

- Caramel: the traditional cup with an added layer of caramel filling. First available in 2006. Discontinued but was brought back in 2023.
- Chocolate Lava: a big cup with an added layer of chocolate lava. Introduced in August 2024.
- Crunchy: a traditional cup with crunchy peanut butter, as opposed to the smooth peanut butter in the original. Introduced in the 1970s. It has been discontinued and rereleased over the years. Still available in some markets as of 2019.
- Crunchy Cookie Cup: a layered cup with crushed chocolate cookies and peanut butter filling. First available in 1997. Discontinued in 1999, but was brought back in 2017. Hershey has since launched a Big Cup version called Reese's Big Cup Crunchy Cookie.
- Double Chocolate: chocolate fudge filling instead of peanut butter. Limited edition. First available in 2006. Discontinued.
- Double Crunch: a traditional cup with peanut filling similar to a Snickers bar, released in the fourth quarter of 2010.
- Hazelnut Cream: hazelnut filling instead of the standard peanut butter filling. Was only available in Canada and now discontinued.
- Honey Roasted: a traditional cup substituting honey roasted peanut butter. First available in the early 2000s but was brought back in 2017 as 'Taste of Georgia Honey Roasted Reese's' for a limited time. Discontinued.
- Marshmallow: the traditional cup with an added layer of marshmallow filling. First available in 2007. Discontinued.
- Peanut Butter & Banana Creme: a layered cup with a top chocolate layer, bottom banana crème layer, and peanut butter filling; released as a tribute to Elvis Presley. It was available in standard, Big Cups and Miniatures sizes. First available in 2007. Discontinued.

Coating variations:

- Chocolate Lovers: a thicker chocolate cup with a thinner layer of peanut butter. Was available in 2003–2005. Brought back for Summer 2019.
- Dark Chocolate: peanut butter filling in a dark chocolate cup. First available in early 2000s; introduced on and off as part of limited edition product variations for many years, then made its permanent debut in 2009.
- Fudge: a thicker, darker chocolate cup with peanut butter filling. First available in 2004. Discontinued.
- White Creme: peanut butter filling in a white chocolate cup. In December 2003, the White Reese's Peanut Butter Cup product variation was permanently added to the Reese's Peanut Butter Cup product line. The product brand variation originally launched as "White Chocolate Reese's Peanut Butter Cups" but was changed to White Reese's or White Creme Reese's after scrutiny for its misrepresentation since the product does not actually include any chocolate.

Coating and filling variations:

- Extra Smooth & Creamy: Has a smoother chocolate and peanut butter filling. First available in early 2000s. Discontinued.
- Inside Out: chocolate filling in a peanut butter cup (a reversal of the traditional version). First available in 2005. Discontinued.
- Peanut Butter Lovers: a layered cup with top peanut butter layer, thin chocolate layer and peanut butter filling. Was available in 2003–2005. Brought back for Summer 2019. The Peanut Butter Lovers cup in 2005 did not have extra peanut butter in the shell coating as it does today.

=== Holiday editions ===
During the seasons when retailers offer holiday-themed candies, Reese's Peanut Butter candies are available in various shapes that still offer the standard confection theme of the traditional Reese's cup (peanut butter contained in a chocolate shell). They are sold in a 6-pack packaging configuration but are usually available individually. Although exterior packaging is altered to reflect the theme of the representative holiday, the actual holiday itself is never presented.

- Reese's Peanut Butter Hearts: Available mainly during January and February, these are heart-shaped confections representing Valentine's Day. At various retailers, an individually-packaged, larger heart is available as well. These are packaged in all-red exterior packaging. Launched nationally in 1997.
- Reese's Peanut Butter Roses: These are also sold in January and February and represent Valentine's Day.

A packet of Peanut Butter Cups

- Reese's Peanut Butter Eggs: Available mainly during March and April, these are egg-shaped confections representing Easter. Exterior packaging is usually yellow and orange (milk chocolate), white and orange (white chocolate), or dark brown and orange (fudge-flavored chocolate). This is the only holiday-themed item available in three chocolate varieties. Test-marketed in 1966 in Pennsylvania and launched nationally in 1967.
- Reese's Peanut Butter Pumpkins: Available mainly during September and October, these are pumpkin-shaped confections representing Halloween. The packaging is standard Reese's orange with a jack-o-lantern picture and the word "Pumpkins" prominently displayed. Launched nationally in 1993. White Creme pumpkins were added to the Reese's Peanut Butter Pumpkin line in 2017.
- Reese's Peanut Butter Ghosts: Available mainly during September and October, these are ghost-shaped confections representing Halloween. The packaging is Halloween themed with the word scary on it. The ghost replaces the letter "a" in the word scary. First released in 2016.
- Reese's Peanut Butter Franken-Cup: Released in 2020 and sold until 2023, Hershey's first colored Reese's variation. It consists of milk chocolate, white crème that is dyed green, and the traditional peanut butter filling.
- Reese's Werewolf Tracks: Available in September and October, these are werewolf shaped candies similar to moose tracks ice cream. Released in 2024, replacing the Franken-Cup. It consists of milk chocolate, white crème, and the traditional peanut butter filling.
- Reese's Peanut Butter Bats: Available in September and October, these are bat-shaped chocolate candies.
- Reese's Peanut Butter Christmas Trees: Available mainly during November and December, these are evergreen tree-shaped confections representing Christmas. At various retailers these may be available in standard milk chocolate or white. Initially, the packaging was green, white, and orange, but has been changed to a winter scene with a snow-covered ground and a snowman with a central large orange evergreen tree-shape in the center of the package. In November 2015, consumers criticized the product via Twitter for bearing too vague a resemblance to a Christmas tree.
- The above are all slightly larger than a single, ordinary Reese's Cup.
- Reese's Peanut Butter Bells: These bell shaped candies are smaller than a traditional cup, but are slightly larger than a miniature cup and have a higher ratio of chocolate to peanut butter. They are sold in bulk bags, much like Hershey Kisses.
- Reese's Peanut Butter Bunny: A larger, individually-packaged Easter Bunny. Formerly known as a Reester Bunny.
- Reese's Snowman: The peanut butter snowman is three times larger than the peanut butter tree, egg or pumpkin.
- Reese's Peanut Butter Ugly Sweater: Candy in the shape of an ugly sweater, a common Christmas gift.
- Reese's Peanut Butter Footballs: Candy in the shape of a football, available during football season.
- Reese's Milk Chocolate Peanut Butter Nutcrackers: Candy in the shape of a nutcracker doll, a Christmas decoration.
- Reese's Peanut Butter Shapes These are Christmas-themed candies in the shapes of snowmen, bells, and trees, sold during the holiday season.
- Reese's Peanut Butter Santas. These are shaped like Santa Claus.

=== Other products ===
- Reese's Crispy Crunchy is a candy bar made of flaky peanut butter and chopped peanuts coated with milk chocolate. It was introduced in 2006.
- Reese's Cluster Bites are bite sized candy clusters made of peanut butter, caramel and peanuts coated in milk chocolate.
- Reese's Fast Break (sold in Canada as Reese's + Nougat and previously Hershey Sidekick) feature peanut butter over a layer of nougat and covered in chocolate. It was introduced in 2001 in the United States and Canada. It was discontinued in Canada in September 2006, but was revived in January 2025, under the name Reese's + Nougat.
- Reese's Plant Based Peanut Butter Cups, are peanut butter cups made with oat milk instead of cow's milk. They were introduced into the U.S. in 2023.
- Reese's Snack Bar, peanut butter creme, crisp whole grain brown rice, roasted peanuts, and milk chocolate.
- Reese's Sticks, formerly called "ReeseSticks", are wafers filled with peanut butter and covered in chocolate. They were introduced in 1998 and are sold in pairs, similar to Twix and Kit Kat bars. They are banned in Norway because of the use of genetically modified additives.
- Reese's Whipps is a candy bar made of peanut butter nougat and a layer of peanut butter and chocolate. It was introduced in 2007.
- Reese's Peanut Butter Ice Cream is chocolate and peanut butter flavored ice cream containing mini Reese's Peanut Butter Cups.
- Reese's Puffs are a corn-based breakfast cereal manufactured and distributed in the U.S. by General Mills inspired by Reese's Peanut Butter Cups.

== Marketing and advertising ==
In the United States, Reese's Peanut Butter Cups typically come in packs of 2, 4, 5, 10 or 20 in distinctive orange packaging, set on thin but rigid paperboard trays. The "Classic" two-pack is a 0.75 ounces (21 g) cup since 2001 (originally a 0.9 ounces (26 g) size, reduced to 0.8 ounces (23 g) in 1991), the "King Size" four-pack introduced in the early 1980s is a 0.7 ounces (20 g) cup (originally a 0.8 ounces (23 g) cup until 1991) and the "Lunch" eight-pack is a 0.55 ounces (16 g) cup. "Large Size" packs of three 0.7 oz cups, as well as bags containing 0.6 ounces (17 g) cups, are also available. Reese's Miniatures come in various bag sizes and foil colors for seasonal themes like red, gold and green for the Christmas holiday season. In Canada, they at one point were packaged as Reese Peanut Butter Cups, but were still widely referred to by their American name. The possessive name is recognized only in English grammar, so it was removed to make the name bilingual in Canada. Previously packaged in a two pack, they now come in a standard pack of three 0.55 oz. cups or the king-size variation with four cups. In the United Kingdom and Ireland, they were originally available only in two-packs, though are now available in three-packs, five-packs and miniatures. In 2008, Reese's Peanut Butter Cups were made available in Europe by Hydro Texaco and 7-Eleven.

In the 1970s and 1980s, a series of commercials directed by Jordan Brady were run for Reese's Peanut Butter Cups featuring situations in which two people, one eating peanut butter and one eating chocolate, collided. One person would exclaim, "You got your peanut butter on my chocolate!" and the other would exclaim, "You got your chocolate in my peanut butter!" They would then sample the mixture and remark on the great taste, tying in with the slogan "Two great tastes that taste great together."

In the 1990s, the product's slogan was: "There's no wrong way to eat a Reese's."

Reese's was an associate sponsor of NASCAR Cup Series drivers Mark Martin (1994), Bill Elliott (1995–2000), and Kevin Harvick (2007–2010).

Atlanta Dream player Angel Reese became an official brand ambassador for Reese's after fans' enthusiasm for the idea. A customized basketball jersey with Reese's Peanut Butter Cups colors and her name and Chicago Sky number was designed. In September 2026, Reese's unveiled a collaboration with Reebok for Angel Reese 1 shoes inspired by the candy.

== See also ==
- List of peanut dishes
