= Christmas Bells =

Christmas Bells may refer to

== Plants ==
- Blandfordia, genus of flowering plant native to Australia
- Sandersonia, a plant genus native to South Africa, of the family Colchicaceae

== Art, entertainment and media ==
=== Literature ===
- "Christmas Bells", a poem by Henry Wadsworth Longfellow that is the basis for the Christmas carol "I Heard the Bells on Christmas Day"

=== Music ===
- "Christmas Bells", a song by comedy music act DJ Europe
- "Christmas Bells", a song from the musical Rent
- "Snoopy's Christmas", a song by The Royal Guardsmen, which contains the chorus "Christmas Bells, oh, Christmas Bells".

=== Television ===
- "Christmas Bells", an advertisement for Hershey's Kisses.
