= Hershey bar =

American chocolate candy bar

Hershey's Milk Chocolate

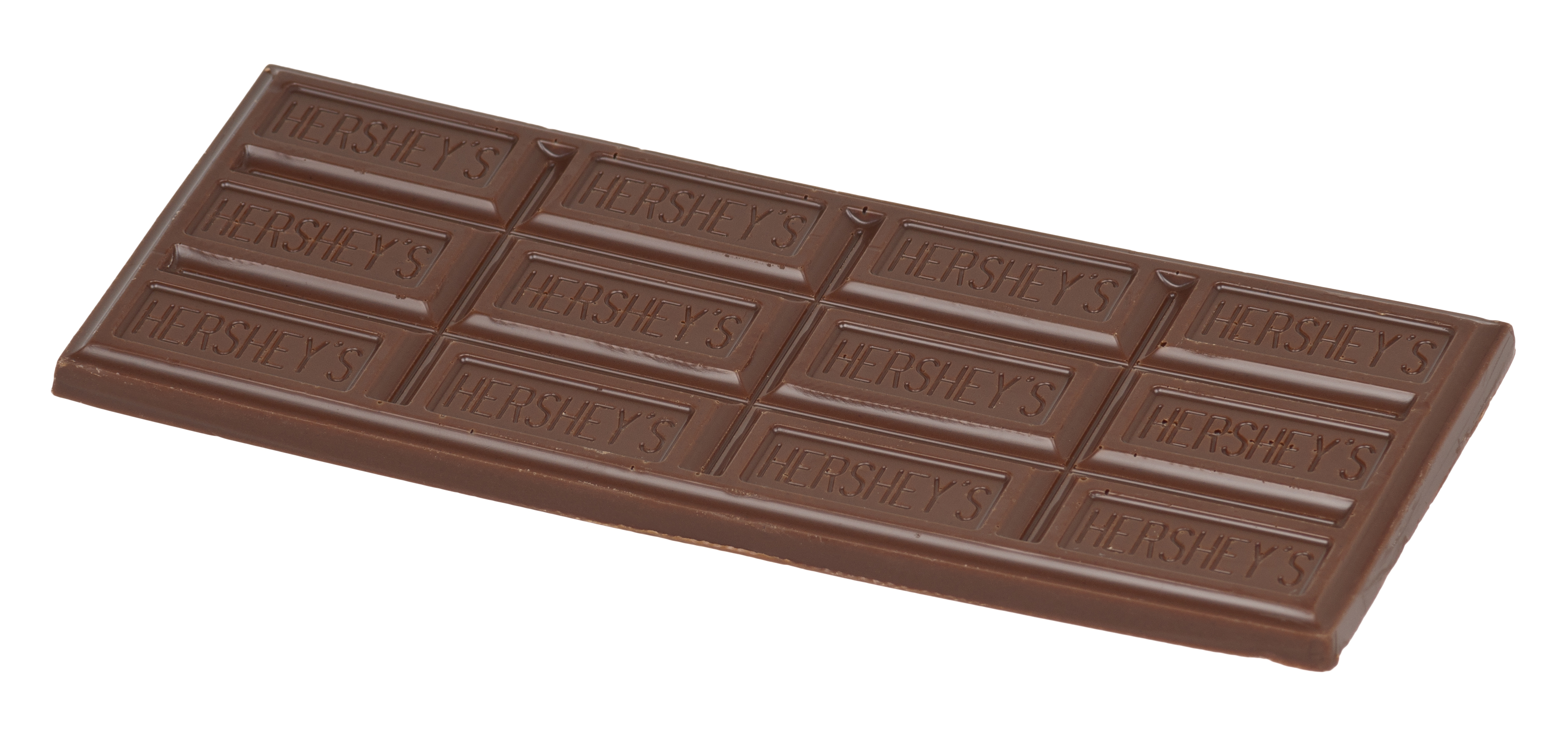
- Product type: Chocolate bar
- Current owner: The Hershey Company
- Produced by: The Hershey Company
- Country: United States
- Introduced: November 11, 1900; 125 years ago
- Related brands: Hershey's Kisses; Hershey's Cookies 'n' Creme; Hershey's Special Dark; Hershey's Miniatures
- Markets: Worldwide
- Ambassador: Milton Hershey
- Tagline: The Great American Chocolate Bar; There's a smile in every Hershey Bar.
- Website: hersheyland.com

The Hershey's Milk Chocolate Bar (commonly called the Hershey's Bar, or more simply the Hershey Bar) is a flagship chocolate bar manufactured by The Hershey Company. Hershey refers to it as "The Great American Chocolate Bar". The Hershey Milk Chocolate Bar was first sold in 1900.

== History of Hershey chocolate bars ==
Hershey chocolate bars had their origin in Milton Hershey's first successful confectionery business, Lancaster Caramel Company, which was founded in 1886. After seeing German chocolate manufacturing machinery at the World's Columbian Exposition of 1893 in Chicago, Hershey decided to go into the chocolate making business. After purchasing the chocolate processing machinery, Hershey began by applying chocolate coatings to the caramels. The next year, 1894, Hershey founded the Hershey Chocolate Company and incorporated it as a subsidiary of the Lancaster Caramel Company. The Hershey Chocolate Company developed its own line of chocolate products, marketed as "sweet chocolate novelties" to distinguish them from unsweetened baking chocolate. After developing the Hershey process to mass-produce chocolate in 1899, Hershey sold the Lancaster Caramel Company in August 1900, and kept the chocolate manufacturing business. In November of that same year, Hershey began to produce and sell the Hershey chocolate bar.

== Varieties of Hershey's Bars ==
Product	Image	Sizes	Description	Ingredients	Year
Milk Chocolate Bar		standard bar 1.55 oz.; miniatures; 1 lb. bar; XL bar; giant bar 7 oz.	A Hershey's chocolate candy bar containing milk chocolate. Commonly thought of as the "original” or "normal" Hershey's chocolate bar.	Milk Chocolate, Cane Sugar, Milk, Chocolate, Cocoa Butter, Milk Fat, Lecithin, Natural Flavor	1900
Milk Chocolate Bar with Almonds		standard bar 1.55 oz.; giant bar 6.8 oz.	A Hershey's chocolate candy bar containing milk chocolate with almonds.	Milk Chocolate, Sugar, Milk, Chocolate, Cocoa Butter, Milk Fat, Lecithin, Natural Flavor, Almonds, Sunflower Oil	1908
Hershey's Special Dark Bar		standard bar 1.55 oz.; miniatures; giant bar 6.8 oz.	A Hershey's chocolate candy bar containing a mildly sweet chocolate made of 45% cacao solids. The Special Dark contains less sugar and more cocoa than Hershey's milk chocolate products.	Sugar, Chocolate, Cocoa Butter, Milk Fat, Cocoa Processed With Alkali, Lecithin, Natural Flavor, Milk Contains 2% or Less of: Milk Fat, Lecithin, Disodium Phosphate, Baking Soda, Vanillin (Artificial Flavor)	1939
Hershey's Special Dark Bar with Almonds		standard bar 1.55 oz.	A Hershey's chocolate candy bar containing a mildly sweet chocolate with almond pieces.	Milk Chocolate, Sugar, Milk, Chocolate, Cocoa Butter, Milk Fat, Lecithin, Natural Flavor, Almonds, Sunflower Oil	
Hershey's Cookies 'n' Creme Bar		standard bar, 1.55 oz.; snack size	A Hershey's candy bar containing white creme and cookie bits.	Sugar, vegetable oil, palm oil, shea oil, sunflower oil, palm kernel oil, safflower oil, Nonfat Milk, corn syrup solids, enriched wheat flour, flour, niacin, ferrous sulfate, thiamin mononitrate, riboflavin, folic acid, lactose Contains 2% or Less of: Cocoa Processed With Alkali, Whey, High-fructose corn syrup, Chocolate, Lecithin, Baking Soda, Salt, Natural Flavors, Artificial Flavor, Tocopherols (To Maintain Freshness), PGPR (Emulsifer)	1994
Hershey's Gold Bar		king size, 2.5 oz.; standard, 1.4 oz.; miniatures	A Hershey's candy bar containing caramelized cream, peanuts, and pretzels.	Sugar, Vegetable Oil, Palm Oil, Shea Oil, Sunflower Oil, Soybean Oil, Safflower Oil, Skim Milk, Peanuts, Milk Fat, Bleached Enriched Wheat Flour, Flour, Niacin, Ferrous Sulfate, Thiamin Mononitrate, Riboflavin, Folic Acid, Lactose Contains 2% or Less of: Lecithin, Salt, Malt, Yeast	2017
Hershey's Air Delight Bar		standard bar	A Hershey's candy bar containing milk chocolate gently blended into a light, airy texture, as it is aerated chocolate. It was designed to melt in the consumer's mouth. The bar has been discontinued.	Milk Chocolate	2011
Hershey's White Creme with Almonds		standard bar, 1.4 oz.	A Hershey's candy bar containing white creme and whole almonds.	Sugar, Vegetable Oil, Palm Oil, Shea Oil, Sunflower Oil, Palm Kernel Oil, Safflower Oil, Almonds, Skim Milk, Corn Syrup Solids, Lactose Contains 2% or Less of: Lecithin, Vanillin (Artificial Flavor), PGPR	2019
Hershey's Milk Chocolate & Reese's Pieces Candy Bar		standard bar, 1.5 oz.; king size, 2.55 oz.	A Hershey's chocolate candy bar containing milk chocolate with Reese's Pieces.	Milk Chocolate, Sugar, Cocoa Butter, Chocolate, Skim Milk, Milk Fat, Lecithin, Salt, Natural Flavor, Sugar, Peanuts, Partially Defatted Peanuts, Hydrogenated Vegetable Oil, Palm Kernel Oil, Soybean Oil Contains 2% or Less of: Corn Syrup Solids, Dextrose, Palm Kernel Oil, Corn Syrup, Artificial Color, Yellow 6 Lake, Yellow 5 Lake, Red 40 Lake, Blue 1 Lake, Cornstarch, Salt, Confectioner's Glaze, Lecithin, Modified Cornstarch, Carnauba Wax, Vanillin (Artificial Flavor)	2018
Hershey's Extra Dark Pure Dark Chocolate Bar		standard bar, 3.52 oz.; bag, 5.1 oz.	A dark chocolate candy bar full of natural antioxidants. The Hershey's Extra Dark chocolate is a darker chocolate, containing 60% cacao solids.	Semi-Sweet Chocolate (Chocolate; Sugar; Cocoa; Milk Fat; Cocoa Butter; Soy Lecithin; Natural Vanilla Flavor; and Milk)	
Hershey's Extra Dark Pure Dark Chocolate Bar with Pomegranate		standard bar, 3.52 oz.; bag, 5.1 oz.	A Hershey's Extra Dark Pure Dark Chocolate candy bar variety containing pure dark chocolate with pomegranate flavored pieces.	Semi-Sweet Chocolate (Chocolate, Sugar, Cocoa, Milk Fat, Cocoa Butter, Soy Lecithin, Natural Vanilla Flavor, Milk), Fruit Juice Concentrate (Pomegranate Juice Concentrate, Cranberry Juice Concentrate, Apple Juice Concentrate, Pineapple Juice Concentrate, Elderberry Juice Concentrate), Contains 2% or Less of: Pectin, Natural Flavor, Sugar, Maltodextrin, Malic Acid, Corn Syrup, Ascorbic Acid.	
Hershey's Extra Dark Pure Dark Chocolate Bar with Cranberries, Blueberries, & Almonds		standard bar, 3.52 oz.; bag, 5.1 oz.	A Hershey's Extra Dark Pure Dark Chocolate candy bar variety containing pure dark chocolate, cranberries, blueberries, and almond chips.	Semi-Sweet Chocolate (Chocolate; Sugar; Cocoa; Milk Fat; Cocoa Butter; Soy Lecithin; Natural Vanilla Flavor; and Milk), Almonds (Roasted in Cocoa Butter and/or Sunflower Oil), Blueberries, Cranberries, Sugar, High Fructose Corn Syrup, and Sunflower Oil	

== Hershey's milk chocolate ==
The Hershey Process milk chocolate in these bars uses fresh milk delivered directly from local farms. The process was developed by Milton Hershey and produced the first mass-produced chocolate in the United States. As a result, the Hershey flavor is widely recognized in the United States, the Philippines, and to a minor extent in Canada, where British-produced chocolates were commonly sold, but less so internationally, especially in areas where European chocolates are more widely available. The process is a company and trade secret, but experts speculate that the milk is partially lipolyzed. This produces butyric acid, a compound found in substances such as Parmesan cheese and butter, which stabilizes the milk from further fermentation. This flavor gives the product a "tangy" taste that the US public has come to associate with the taste of chocolate, to the point that other US manufacturers often add butyric acid to their milk chocolates, although the presence of the acid has caused the flavour to be considered unappetising by those more accustomed to chocolate brands which do not include it. In Canada, this led to Hershey introducing a reformulated Canadian bar in 1983.

Starting in 2006, the Hershey company has added polyglycerol polyricinoleate (PGPR) to their chocolate, except for the traditional plain milk chocolate Hershey's Kisses. In 2015, Hershey announced they would begin removing PGPR from the rest of their chocolate. Artificial vanillin was also removed in 2015. Hershey did remove PGPR from some of their chocolate bars, but in April 2019 started putting it back in Hershey's Milk Chocolate with Almonds full size bar, and plain milk chocolate bars, and never removed it from Symphony milk chocolate and other products. Hershey does not claim to use vanilla in their chocolate, only natural flavor.

== Other varieties and details ==
In addition to the standard Milk Chocolate and Milk Chocolate with Almonds varieties, Hershey's produces several other chocolate bars in various flavors: Special Dark chocolate, Cookies 'n' Creme, Symphony (both Milk Chocolate and Almond Toffee), Mr. Goodbar (with peanuts), and Krackel (with crisped rice). Nine flavors were available for limited periods: Double Chocolate, Nut Lovers, Twosomes Reese's Pieces, Cookies 'N' Chocolate, Cookies 'N' Mint, Strawberries 'n' Creme, Raspberries 'n' Creme, Twosomes Heath, and Twosomes Whoppers. All flavors have between 210 and 230 calories per standard-sized bar.

The Kashruth Division of the Union of Orthodox Jewish Congregations of America approves all flavors for consumption by observant Jews, with OU Kosher status.

The largest Hershey's bar commercially available weighs five pounds (2.3 kg) and costs US$44.99 on Hershey's website.

A gold variant with pretzels and peanuts was sold for its 100th anniversary.
