= Reese's Pieces =

Peanut butter candy

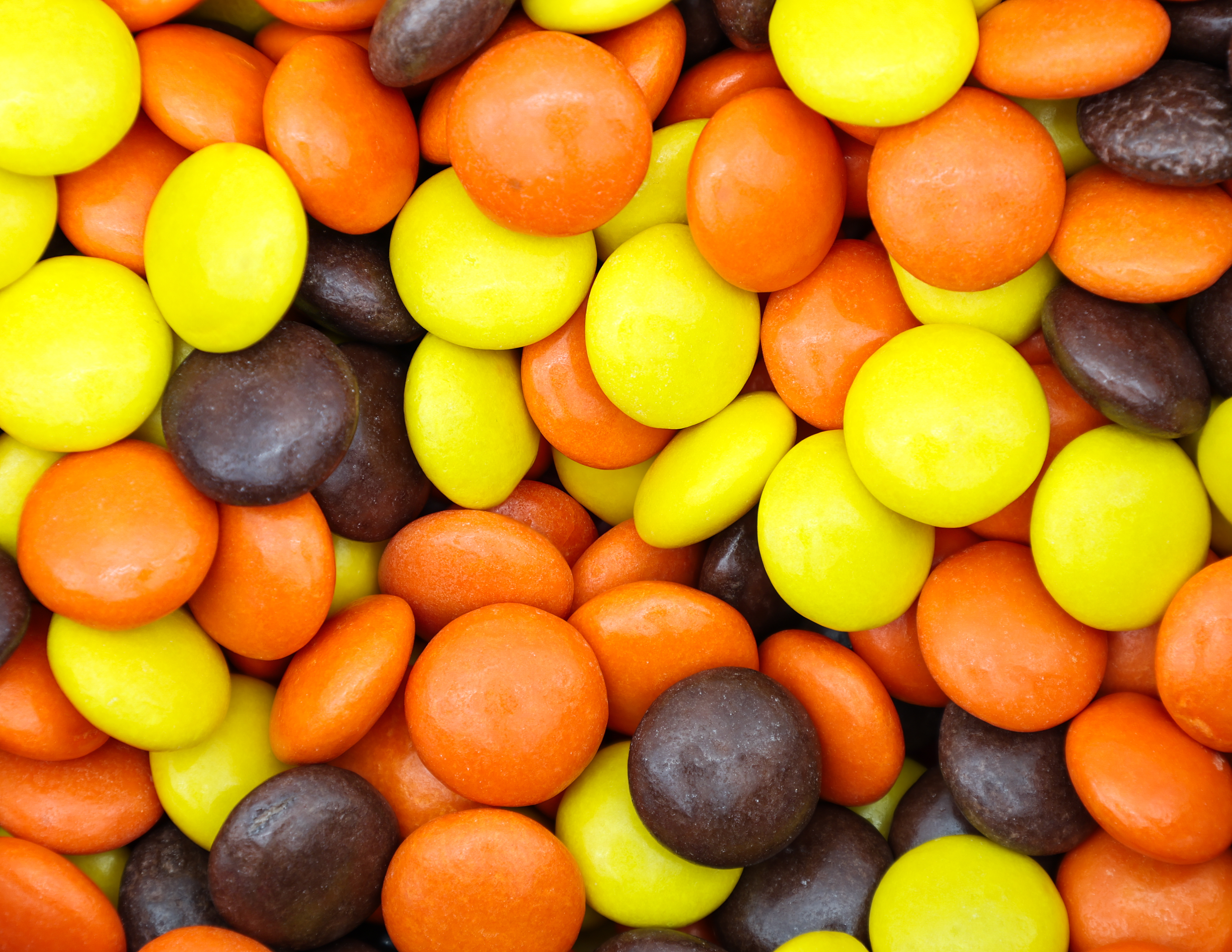
- Reese's Pieces consists of bite-sized pieces of candy filled with a peanut butter center in a crunchy shell.
- Type: Confectionery
- Inventor: The Hershey Company
- Inception: September 1978; 48 years ago
- Manufacturer: The Hershey Company
- Current supplier: The Hershey Company
- Models: Standard candy, Mini candies, baking chips
- Website: hersheyland.com/reeses-pieces/

Reese's Pieces are a peanut butter candy manufactured by The Hershey Company; they are oblate spheroid in shape and covered in candy shells that are colored yellow, orange, or brown. They can be purchased in plastic packets, cardboard boxes, or cup-shaped travel containers.

== Overview ==
The candy was introduced to the US market first in September 1978. Shortly after, Reese's Pieces were introduced to the Canada market in 1980. The then relatively new product became very popular with the 1982 release of E.T. the Extra-Terrestrial, in which the candy is featured.

Reese's Pieces were introduced in the UK in 1996, but are produced in the US.

Reese's Pieces are a product extension of the Reese's Peanut Butter Cups line; they were designed to capitalize on the success of the chocolate-covered peanut butter cups, though unlike the cups, they have no chocolate.

== Variations ==
Reese's Pieces have been included in many Reese's and Hershey's products since their introduction. Below is a list of available products that contain Reese's Pieces, from the candy pieces being stuffed inside of existing chocolate bar variations to bags of baking chip mixes.

Products containing Reese's Pieces
Product	Description	Sizes	Ingredients	Nutrition value	Year introduced
Reese's Pieces	A peanut butter candy in bite-size pieces containing Reese's peanut butter wrapped in a crunchy shell	standard size; bag; box	Sugar, partially defatted peanuts, hydrogenated vegetable oil palm kernel oil, soybean oil, corn syrup Solids, dextrose Contains 2% Less of: corn syrup, palm kernel oil, salt, confectioner's glaze, modified corn starch, lecithin soy, artificial colorants yellow 6 lake, yellow 5 lake, red 40 lake, blue 1 lake, vanillin, artificial flavor, carnauba wax, milk	Reese's Pieces Nutritional value per 38 g: Energy: 836.8 kJ (200.0 kcal); Carbohydrates: 25 g; Sugars: 21 g; Dietary fibre: 0 g; Fat: 9 g; Saturated: 8 g; Trans: 0 g; Protein: 4 g Vitamins and minerals; Vitamins / Quantity %DV^{†}; Vitamin A equiv. / 0% 0 μg; Vitamin C / 0% 0 mg; Minerals / Quantity %DV^{†}; Calcium / 0% 0 mg; Iron / 22% 4 mg; Sodium / 2% 45 mg; ^{†}Percentages estimated using US recommendations for adults.	1978
Reese's Pieces Peanut	The original Reese's Pieces candies with the inclusion of peanuts.	bag	Sugar, Peanuts, Partially Defatted Peanuts, Hydrogenated Vegetable Oil (Palm Kernel And Soybean Oil), Corn Syrup Contains 2% Or Less Of: Dextrose, Artificial Color (Yellow 5 Lake, Yellow 6 Lake, Red 40 Lake, Blue 1 Lake), Palm Kernel Oil, Confectioner's Glaze, Cornstarch, Modified Cornstarch, Salt, Lecithin (Soy), Carnauba Wax, Vanillin (Artificial Flavor), Milk.	Reese's Pieces Peanut Butter with Peanut Nutritional value per 100 g (3.5 oz): Energy: 510 kcal (2,100 kJ); Carbohydrates: 56 g; Sugars: 46 g; Fat: 28 g; Saturated: 15 g; Trans: 0.0 g; Protein: 13 g Vitamins and minerals; Vitamins / Quantity %DV^{†}; Vitamin A equiv. / 0% 0 μg; Vitamin C / 0% 0 mg; Minerals / Quantity %DV^{†}; Calcium / 0% 0 mg; Iron / 10% 1.8 mg; Sodium / 7% 154 mg; Other constituents: Quantity; Cholesterol: 0.0 mg; ^{†}Percentages estimated using US recommendations for adults.	1980s
Reese's Mini Pieces Baking Chips	Mini Reese's Pieces peanut butter candy for baking	bag	Sugar, Partially Defatted Peanuts, Hydrogenated, Vegetable Oil, Palm Kernel Oil, Soybean Oil, Corn Syrup Solids, Dextrose Contains 2% or Less of: Palm Kernel Oil, Corn Syrup, Artificial Color, Yellow 6 Lake, Yellow 5 Lake, Red 40 Lake, Blue 1 Lake, Cornstarch, Salt, Confectioner's Glaze, Lecithin, Modified Cornstarch, Carnauba Wax, Vanillin (ARTIFICIAL FLAVOR), Milk	Reese's Pieces Minis Peanut Butter Candies Nutritional value per 15 g: Energy: 292.88 kJ (70.00 kcal); Carbohydrates: 10 g; Sugars: 8 g; Dietary fibre: 0 g; Fat: 3.5 g; Saturated: 3 g; Trans: 0 g; Protein: 2 g Vitamins and minerals; Vitamins / Quantity %DV^{†}; Vitamin A equiv. / 0% 0 μg; Vitamin D / 0% 0 μg; Minerals / Quantity %DV^{†}; Calcium / 1% 10 mg; Iron / 2% 0.3 mg; Potassium / 1% 40 mg; Sodium / 1% 15 mg; ^{†}Percentages estimated using US recommendations for adults, except for potassium, which is estimated based on expert recommendation from the National Academies.	2003
Reese's Baking Cups and Reese's Pieces Candy	A mixture of mini Reese's Pieces peanut butter candies and mini Reese's Peanut Butter cups for baking	bag	Milk Chocolate, Sugar, Cocoa Butter, Chocolate, Skim Milk, Milk Fat, Lactose, Lecithin, PGPR, Sugar, Partially Defatted Peanuts, Peanuts, Hydrogenated Vegetable Oil, Palm Kernel Oil, Palm Oil, Soybean Oil, Dextrose, Corn Syrup Solids Contains 2% or Less of: Cocoa Butter, Palm Kernel Oil, Salt, Corn Syrup, Confectioner's Glaze, Lecithin, Modified Cornstarch, Artificial Color, Yellow 6 Lake, Yellow 5 Lake, Red 40 Lake, Blue 1 Lake, PGPR, Vanillin (ARTIFICIAL FLAVOR), Carnauba Wax, TBHQ (Preservative), Citric Acid (TO MAINTAIN FRESHNESS)	Reese's Baking Cups and Reese's Pieces Candy Nutritional value per 15 g: Energy: 58.5289 kJ (13.9887 kcal); Carbohydrates: 9 g; Sugars: 8 g; Dietary fibre: 0 g; Fat: 4 g; Saturated: 2.5 g; Trans: 0 g; Protein: 1 g Vitamins and minerals; Vitamins / Quantity %DV^{†}; Vitamin A equiv. / 0% 0 μg; Vitamin D / 0% 0 μg; Minerals / Quantity %DV^{†}; Calcium / 1% 10 mg; Iron / 2% 0.4 mg; Potassium / 2% 45 mg; Sodium / 1% 25 mg; ^{†}Percentages estimated using US recommendations for adults, except for potassium, which is estimated based on expert recommendation from the National Academies.	2018

== Production ==
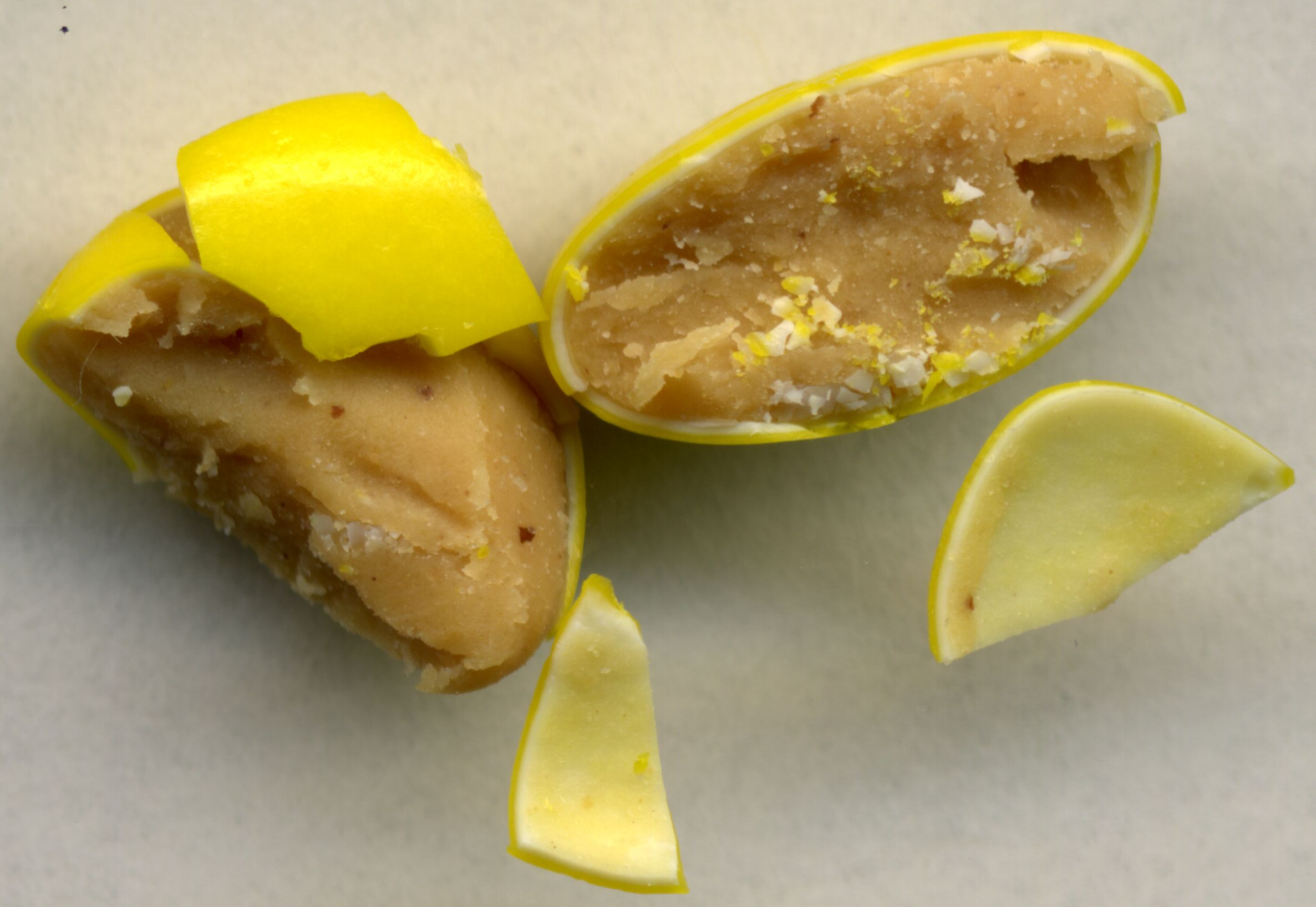
A yellow Reese's Piece cut in half, showing the peanut butter inside

In the 1970s, the candies were produced by The Hershey Company using panning machines that had been used to make Hershey-ets, a chocolate-filled candy that had been discontinued. The candy was first called "PBs" and was later rechristened as Reese's Pieces. Designers wanted a peanut-flavored candy but had problems with the filling. Original plans called for filling the candy shells with peanut butter, but the oil leaked out into the shell, leaving it soft, rather than crunchy.

The developer of the project turned the problem over to a team of outside scientists, who created a peanut-flavored penuche filling. More experimentation was needed to determine the correct thickness of the shell. Finally, the colors of the candy coating were designed to coordinate with the color of the Reese's package. The color distribution goal is 50% orange, 25% brown, and 25% yellow.

== E.T. the Extra-Terrestrial ==
In 1982, the Mars candy bar company rejected a product placement offer for the inclusion of its key product M&M's in the Steven Spielberg film, E.T. the Extra-Terrestrial. Hershey accepted an offer for use of Reese's Pieces in the movie, and with the film's blockbuster success its product sales dramatically increased, perhaps as much as 300%.

== Product line expansion ==
In 2010, The Hershey Company expanded the Pieces line to include York Peppermint Pattie Pieces, Hershey's Special Dark Pieces, and Almond Joy Pieces. Hershey's Milk Chocolate with Almonds Pieces became the fourth expansion of this line in 2012.

== Partnership ==
Atlanta Dream player Angel Reese became an official brand ambassador for Reese's Pieces, after fans' enthusiasm for the idea. Angel Reese's fans are known as Reese's Pieces. The most notable creations were a customized basketball jersey with Reese's Pieces colors and her WNBA number, and Angel Reese appearing on the Reese's Puffs cereal box. Senior brand manager Melissa Blette stated Reese was chosen for her personality and excited fanbase, in addition to her name. Blette reported that Reese's sales exceeded expectations. A year later, Reese's and Reebok teamed together to create Angel Reese 1 shoes inspired by the candy.

== See also ==
- Galaxy Minstrels
- M&M's
- Smarties—chocolate candies that are not sold in the U.S.
