= Peanut butter cookie =

Cookie prominently featuring peanut butter

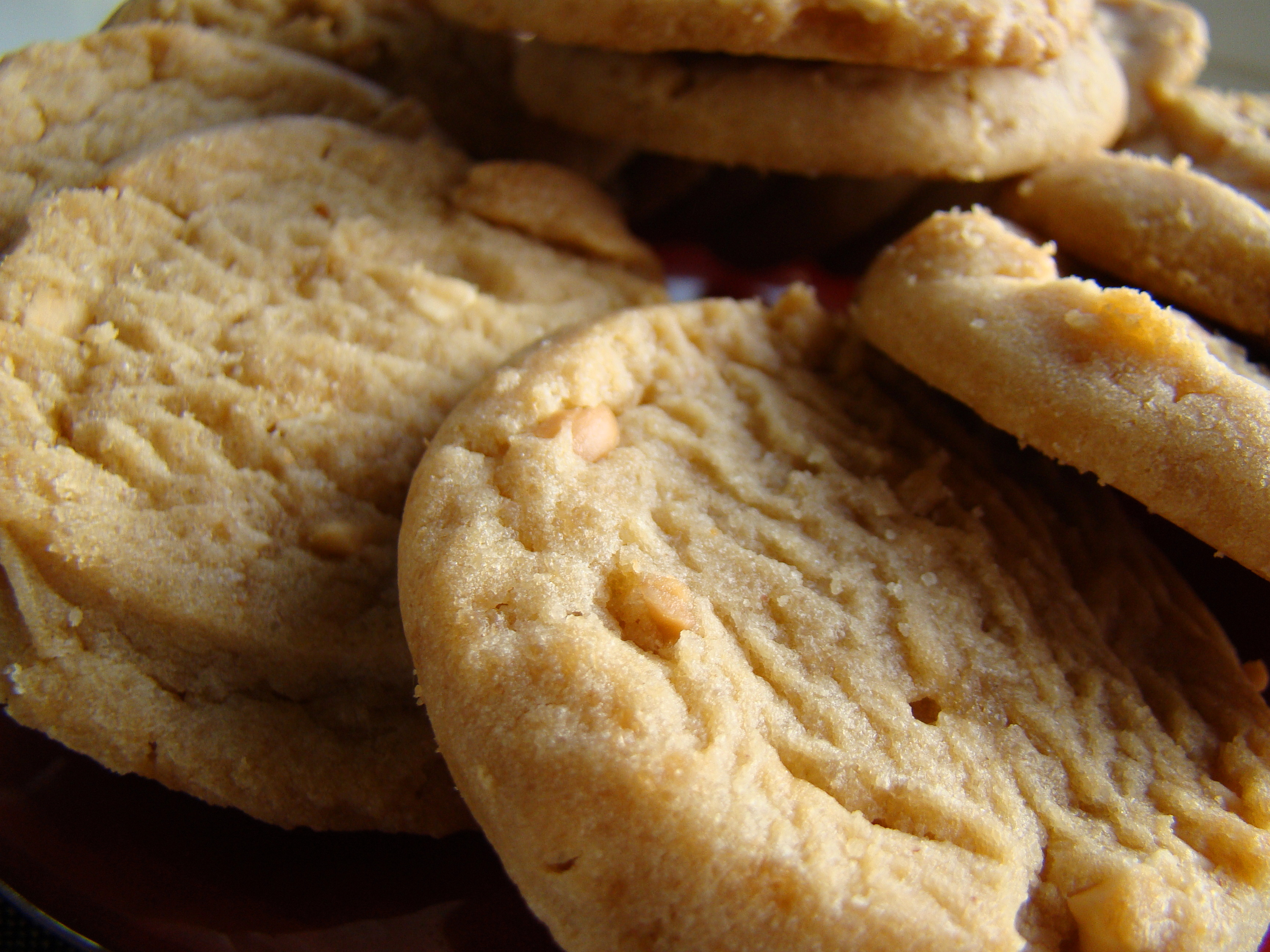
- Peanut butter cookies with peanut chunks
- Type: Cookie
- Place of origin: United States
- Main ingredients: Peanut butter

A peanut butter cookie is a type of cookie that has peanut butter as a principal ingredient. The cookie originated in the United States, its development dating back to the 1920s.

== History ==
George Washington Carver (1864–1943), an American agricultural extension educator from Alabama's Tuskegee Institute, was the most well known promoter of the peanut as a replacement for the cotton crop, which had been heavily damaged by the boll weevil. He compiled 105 peanut recipes from various cookbooks, agricultural bulletins, and other sources. In his 1925 research bulletin called How to Grow the Peanut and 105 Ways of Preparing it for Human Consumption, he included three recipes for peanut cookies calling for crushed or chopped peanuts.

It was not until the early 1930s that peanut butter was listed as an ingredient in the cookies.

== Fork pressing and patterning ==
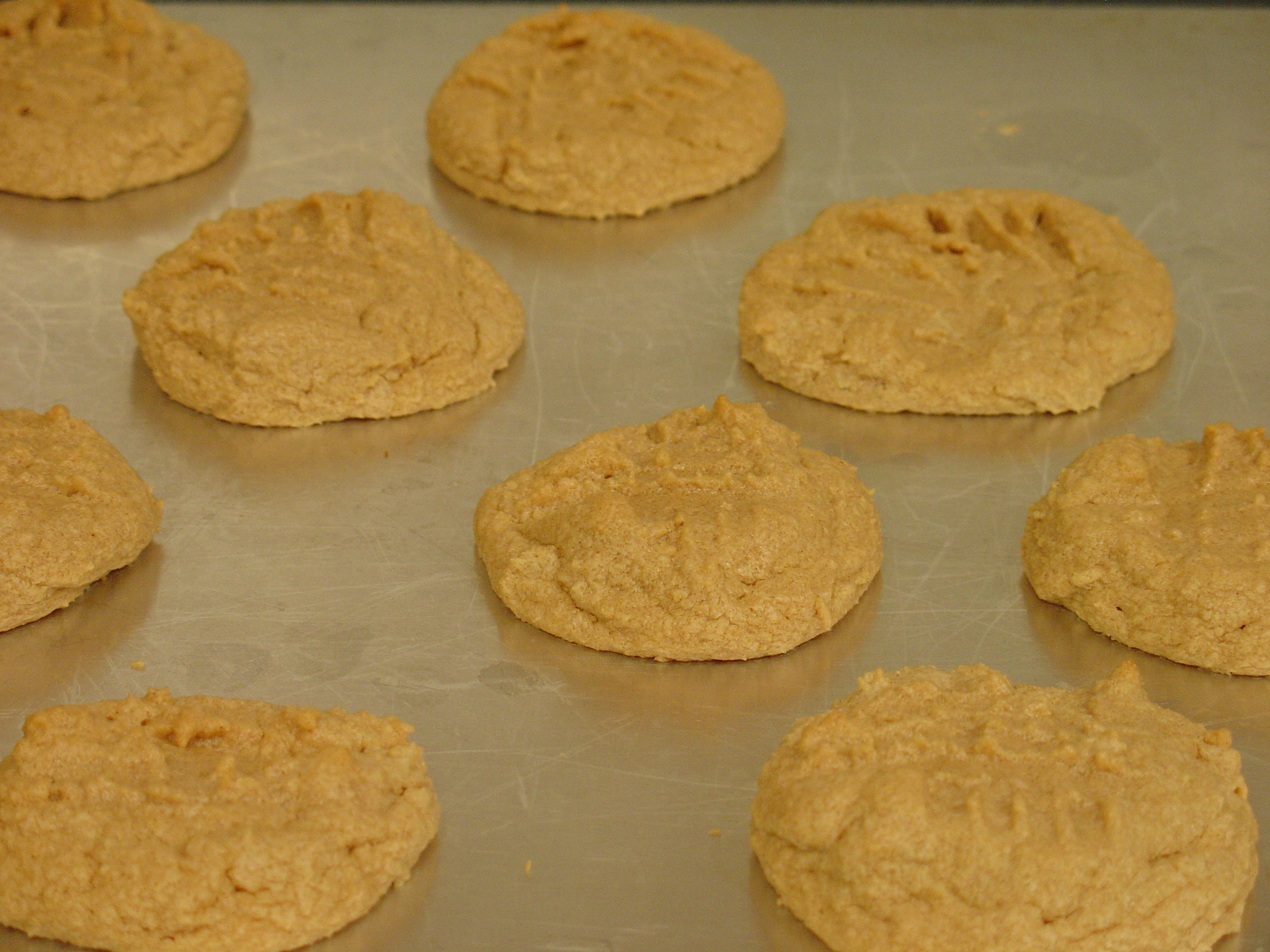
Peanut butter cookies on a baking tray

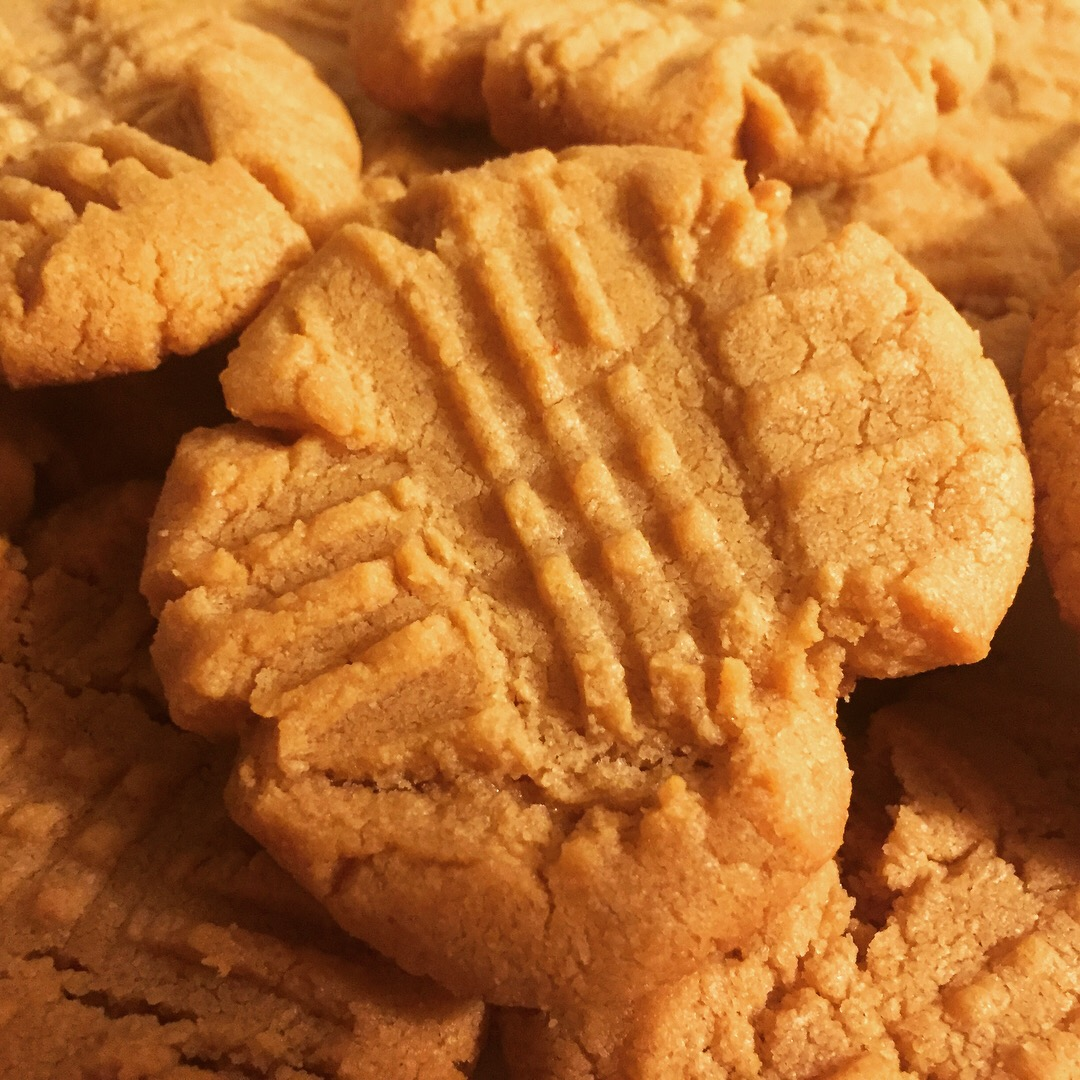
Peanut butter fork-scored cookies

Early peanut butter cookies were either rolled thin and cut into shapes, or else they were dropped and made into balls; they did not have fork marks. The earliest references to the famous criss-cross marks created with fork tines were published in newspapers in early summer 1932, including the Schenectady Gazette on July 1 of that year. The Peanut Butter Cookies recipe said: "[s]hape into balls and after placing them on the cookie sheet, press each one down with a fork, first one way and then the other, so they look like squares on waffles." Contrary to earlier reports that the marks were first referenced in the Schenectady Gazette, the recipe appears to have been part of the syndicated column "Household Hints By Mrs. Mary Morton," the earliest known publication of the recipe being June 13, 1932, in New Jersey's Camden Courier-Post.

Pillsbury, one of the large flour producers, popularized the use of a fork in the 1930s. The Peanut Butter Balls recipe in the 1933 edition of Pillsbury's Balanced Recipes instructed the cook to press the cookies using fork tines, but did not explain its purpose. The reason is that peanut butter cookie dough is dense, and unpressed, each cookie will not cook evenly. Using a fork to press the dough is a convenience of tool; bakers can also use a cookie shovel (spatula).

== See also ==
- Peanut butter blossom cookie (peanut butter cookie with a Hershey's Kisses chocolate candy in center)
- List of cookies
- List of peanut dishes
