= Chocolate kiss =

Chocolate kiss may refer to:

- Chocolate kiss, a term used in the United States and Canada for Kisses (confectionery)
- Chocolate kiss, a term used in Germany for Chocolate-coated marshmallow treats
