= Hershey's Drops =

Chocolate candy

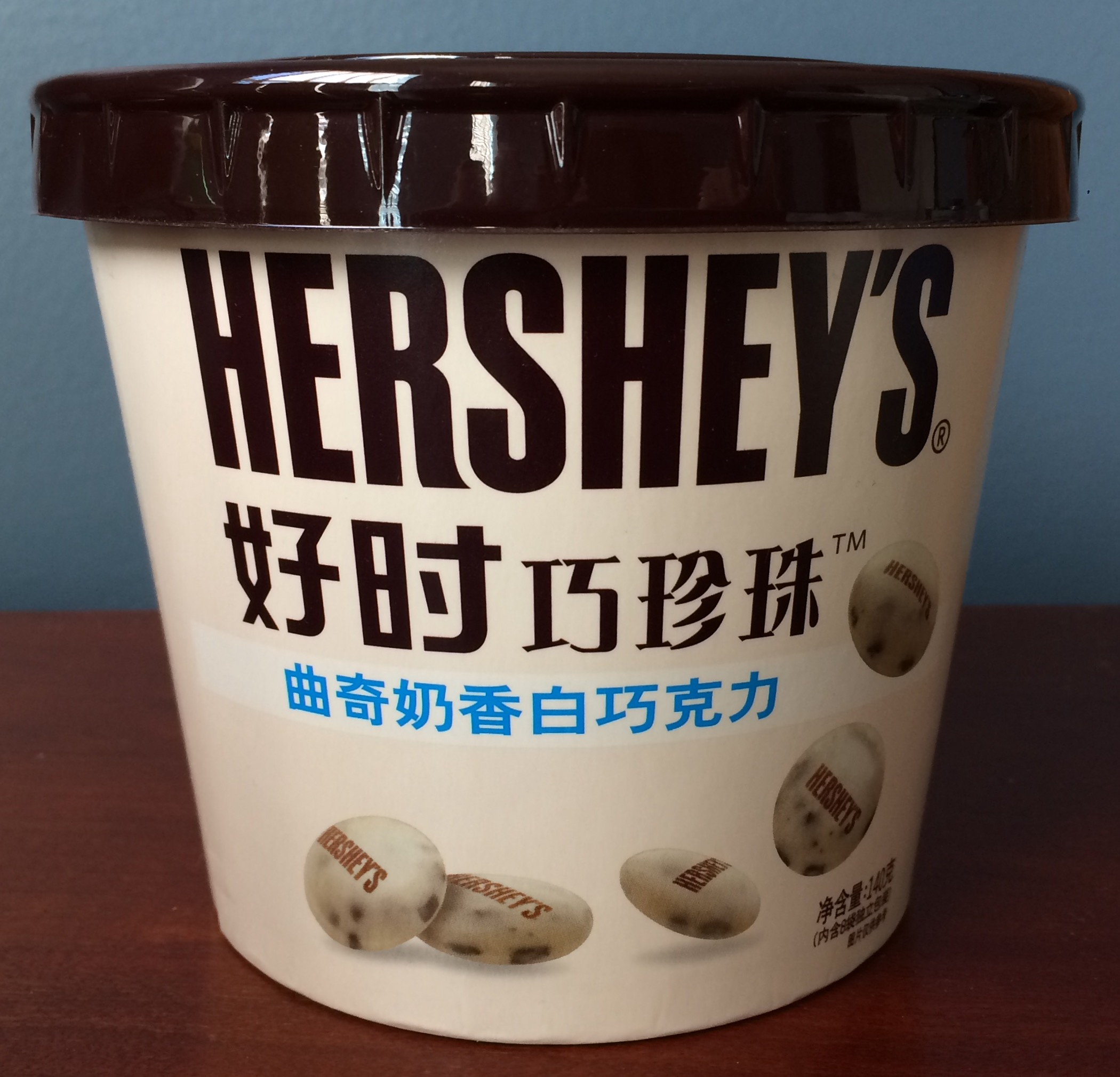
- A container of Cookies 'n' Creme Hershey's Drops from China
- Product type: Chocolate candies
- Current owner: The Hershey Company
- Produced by: The Hershey Company
- Country: United States
- Introduced: 2010; 16 years ago
- Related brands: Hershey bar, Hershey's Cookies 'n' Creme
- Markets: North America, Asia
- Tagline: A lot of Hershey happiness in a little drop of chocolate
- Website: hersheyland.com/drops

Hershey's Drops are circular-shaped chocolate candies produced by The Hershey Company, launched on December 1, 2010. There are two variants available: "Hershey's Milk Chocolate Drops" and "Hershey's Cookies ‘n’ Cream Drops", the former based on the traditional Hershey's Milk Chocolate bar and the latter based on the popular Cookies ‘n’ Creme-flavoured variant. While similarly shaped, Hershey's Drops lack the hard candy shell found on M&M's and similar candies. They originated in the United States and have since become common internationally in countries such as Canada and China. In the United States, the candies are available in resealable containers, and in China the candies are available wrapped in plastic packets within cardboard containers sealed with a plastic lid.
