= Hershey's Miniatures =

American candy bar assortment product

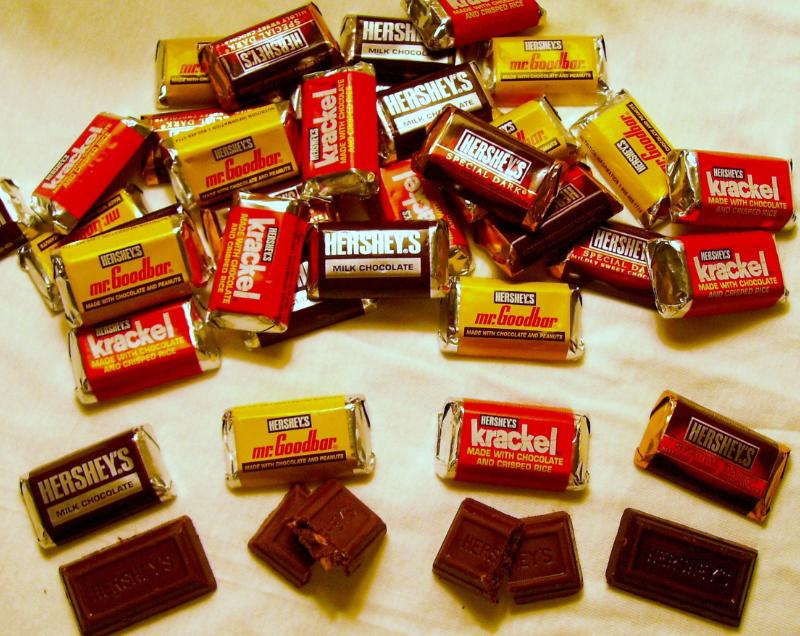
- A packaged assortment of miniature versions of chocolate candy bars that include the Hershey’s Chocolate Bar, Hershey’s Special Dark Chocolate Bar, Krackel Chocolate Bar, and Mr. Goodbar.
- Type: Chocolate bar
- Inventor: The Hershey Company
- Inception: 1939
- Manufacturer: The Hershey Company
- Available: Available
- Current supplier: The Hershey Company
- Website: hersheyland.com/hersheys-miniatures

Hershey's Miniatures are neapolitan candy bars sold by The Hershey Company in packages of individually wrapped chocolates. The current assortment contains traditional Hershey bars, Mr. Goodbar, Hershey's Special Dark, and Krackel bars.

== Description ==
Hershey's Miniatures were first introduced as an assortment in 1939, featuring the five most popular Hershey candy bars of the period: Hershey bars, Krackel bars, Mr. Goodbars, Bitter-Sweet now called Hershey's Special Dark, and a fifth-bar, Hershey's Nougat-Almond. Also promoted as a full-size bar at that time, Hershey's Nougat-Almond was later discontinued in 1942 due to wartime restrictions and was no longer included in Hershey's Miniatures assortments.

== Ingredients ==
Sugar, Chocolate, Cocoa Butter, Peanuts, Milk, Nonfat Milk, Milk Fat, Rice Flour, Contains 2% or Less of: Cocoa Processed With Alkali, Lecithin, PGPR (EMULSIFIER), Lactose, Salt, Malt, Extract, Monoglycerides, Natural Flavor, Artificial Flavor

Each Miniature weighs roughly 8.6g and contains 42 calories.

== Product and packaging ==
There have been a number of Hershey's Miniature product variations introduced by the company. In November 2004, a line extension called Hershey's Miniatures Nut Lovers featuring four kinds of chocolate paired with four varieties of nuts was introduced. Also in December 2004 a Special Dark miniatures bag was introduced with three different Special Dark miniature bars. Earlier in 2004, Hershey entered into a multi-year endorsement agreement with popular singer and actress Thalía, which included La Dulceria Thalia Hershey's Miniatures, a cookie and candy assortment. Television commercials from that endorsement showed the pop star eating Hershey Kisses, Jolly Ranchers and Hershey Miniatures.

In 2014, a Hershey Miniature bars label design change would save approximately 270,000 pounds of paper per year, equal to about 2,000 trees. In 2016, the Hershey Miniature Assortment was brought to market in a special patriotic red, white and blue bag.
