= Peanut butter blossom cookie =

American cookie

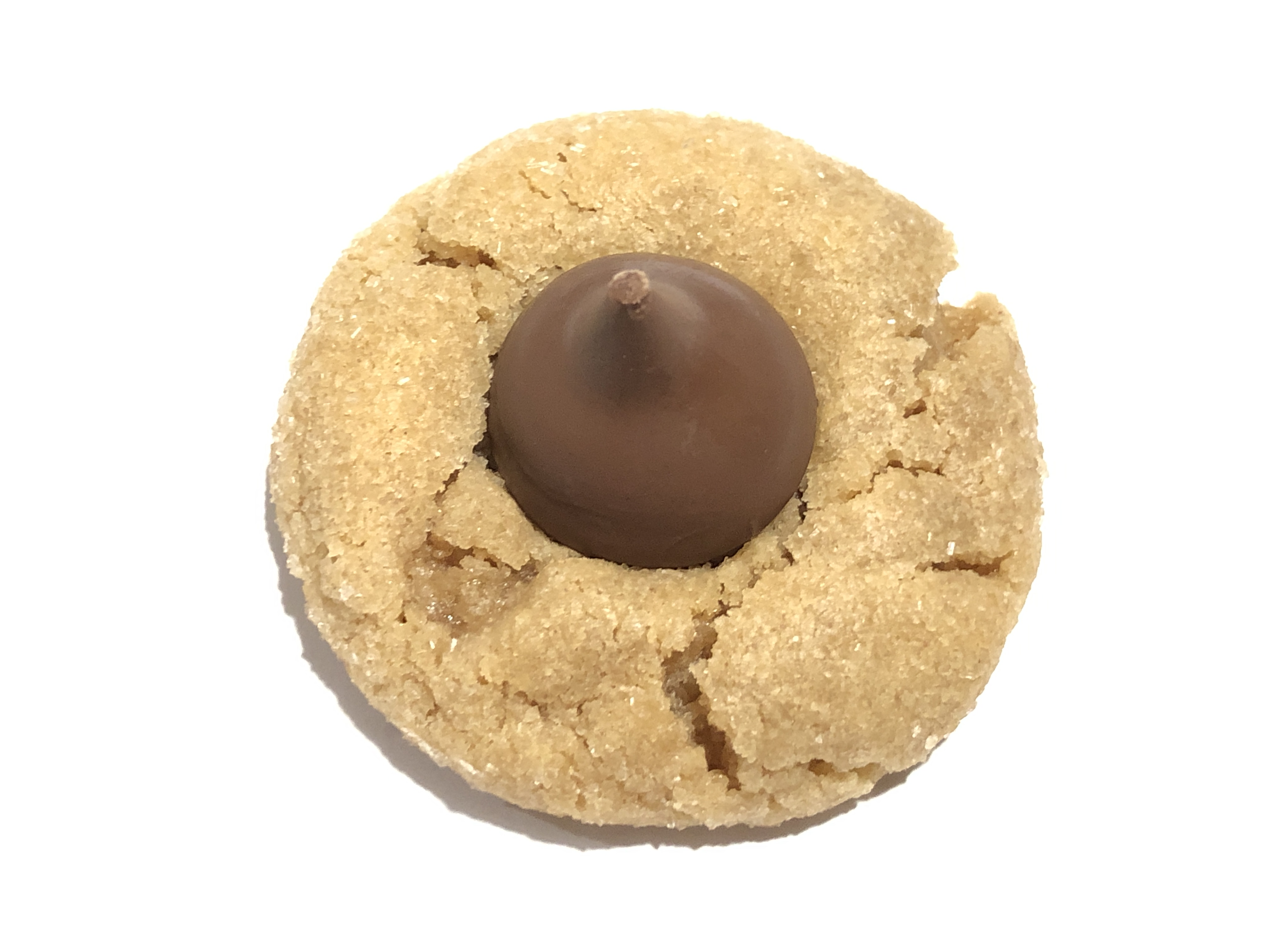
- Soft peanut butter cookie dough rolled in sugar, cooked and topped in center with Hershey Kisses milk chocolate
- Alternative names: Peanut butter kiss cookie
- Type: Peanut butter cookie
- Course: Dessert or Snack
- Place of origin: United States
- Associated cuisine: North American cuisine
- Created by: Freda Strasel Smith
- Invented: 1957
- Cooking time
- Serving temperature: 48 cookies
- Main ingredients: Peanut butter; Hershey's Kisses; Sugar; Flour; Brown sugar
- Ingredients generally used: Egg; Shortening; Vanilla extract; Milk; Baking soda; Salt
- Variations: Multiple, including using Hershey's Hugs, Candy Cane Kisses, Caramel Kisses, Cocoa for Chocolate Peanut Butter dough
- Food energy (per 1 cookie serving): 90 kcal (380 kJ)Fat Secret
Nutritional value
(per 1 cookie serving)
- Protein: 2 g
- Fat: 6 g
- Carbohydrate: 10 g

The peanut butter blossom cookie, which originated in 1957, is made with a peanut butter cookie dough and is topped with a piece of chocolate candy. The cookie is considered a snack or dessert and is often served at events or during holidays in the United States.

The exact term "peanut butter blossom cookie" refers to the original variation of the cookie – a soft peanut butter cookie rolled in granulated sugar and topped with a Hershey's Kiss. However, many variations on the recipe have since evolved to include different flavors, both in the dough or as the topping.

The classic peanut butter blossom cookie can be easily adapted for different occasions.

== Overview ==
The cookie originated in Gibsonburg, Ohio, as an entry into the 1957 Pillsbury Bake-Off contest. The cookie was originally named Black-eyed Susans, but was renamed by Pillsbury to the Peanut Butter Blossom cookie.

The original cookie recipe can be found on the back of the Hershey's Kisses bag, and in the 9th Pillsbury Bake-Off Contest cookbook.

Authors of dessert recipe books, cooking blogs and websites have since created their own variations on the cookie.

== History ==
=== Invention ===
Freda Strasel Smith of Gibsonburg, Ohio, created the cookie using a traditional peanut butter cookie dough, leaving the dough unpressed for baking, and topping the finished cookie with a Hershey's Kisses candy. In 1957, Smith entered the cookie, then called Black-eyed Susans, into the Pillsbury Bake-Off contest.

The peanut butter blossom cookie went through to the final round of the competition held in Beverly Hills, California, and finished in third place. Pillsbury changed the recipe name to Peanut Butter Blossoms.

=== Later history ===
The peanut butter blossom cookie has become a recognized dessert across the US, largely due to Pillsbury and the Hershey Company capitalizing on the popularity of the cookie after the contest by using the recipe to promote their own brands.

In 1965, Pillsbury filmed a commercial in New York City featuring Freda Smith's daughter, Jo Anne Smith Lytle, making the famous peanut butter blossom cookies.

Pillsbury Company stated the Peanut Butter Blossom is one of the most famous recipes ever entered into the bake-off contest, despite it not winning 1st prize.

In 1999, the Peanut Butter Blossom cookie was one of ten recipes inducted into the Pillsbury Bake-Off Hall of Fame at the Smithsonian National Museum of American History in Washington, D.C.

=== Hershey's Marketing ===
The Hershey Company capitalized on the recipe by including it on every bag of Hershey's Kisses after Freda Smith placed in the 1957 competition, which helped promote and grow the peanut butter blossom cookie to what it is today – a cookie frequently found on Christmas dessert tables across the US, as well as a popular option on cookie tables at weddings.

== The Original Peanut Butter Blossom ==
The original recipe created by Freda Smith can be found on Pillsbury's website, and is the same recipe Hershey still promotes to this day.

To make the Hershey's Kiss stick in the cookie, it needs to be pressed into the center as soon as the cookies come out of the oven and are still hot. It is advised the paper plume and aluminum foil be removed from the Kiss prior to baking the cookie.

=== Nutritional Information ===
1 cookie contains 90 calories, 6 grams of fat, 10 grams of carbs and 2 grams of protein.

Peanut Butter Blossoms)
Nutritional value per 100 g (3.5 oz)
- Carbohydrates: 10.0 g
- Sugars: 6 g
- Dietary fiber: .7 g
- Fat: 6.0 g
- Protein: 2.0 g
Vitamins and minerals
Vitamins	Quantity %DV^{†}
Vitamin C	0% 0 mg
Minerals	Quantity %DV^{†}
Calcium	0% 0 mg
Iron	0% 0 mg
Magnesium	0% 0 mg
Sodium	3% 75 mg
- Link to Fat Secret Database entry
- ^{†}Percentages estimated using US recommendations for adults.

== Variations ==
There are many variations to this classic cookie. Cookbooks, cooking blogs and websites have published many twists on this easy, simple cookie recipe. To get more festive for holidays, bakers add colored sugar crystals, or to get more of a peanut butter taste, bakers use a peanut butter cup in place of the Hershey's Kiss. Some variations on the cookie use a Hershey's Hugs to add white chocolate into the cookie.

Another option is to add more chocolate by using cocoa powder in the dough.

== See also ==
- List of cookies
