= Hershey's Special Dark =

Dark chocolate bar

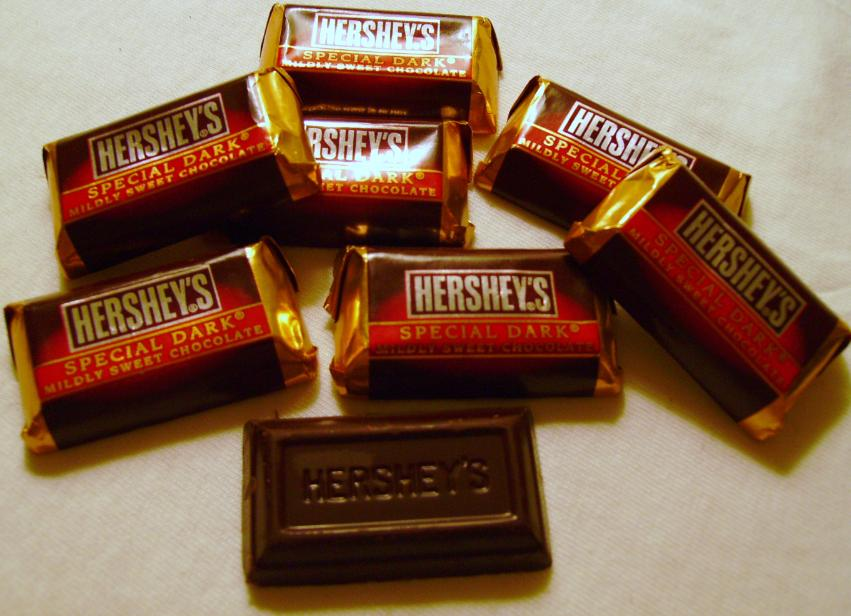
- A mildly sweet chocolate candy bar made with dark chocolate.
- Type: Chocolate bar
- Inventor: The Hershey Company
- Inception: 1939; 87 years ago
- Manufacturer: The Hershey Company
- Available: Available
- Current supplier: The Hershey Company
- Models: Bars, nuggets, miniatures, chips, kisses, cocoa powder, zero sugar, organic
- Website: hersheyland.com/special-dark

Hershey's Special Dark is a chocolate bar manufactured by The Hershey Company.

== History ==
In 1894, before the introduction of the milk chocolate Hershey bar in 1900, the Hershey Chocolate Company manufactured and marketed "vanilla sweet chocolate" a semi-sweet chocolate. This bar has been described as the "first" American candy bar. The company continued to provide semi-sweet chocolate products and in the 1930s a Not-So-Sweet bar and in 1939, added the Bitter-Sweet bar to Hershey's Miniatures. The Hershey's Semi-Sweet bar was being sold in the market in the 1960s.

== Miniatures ==
Hershey's Special Dark is a component of the traditional Hershey's Miniatures assortment first sold in 1939, when the Special Dark was called Bitter-Sweet.

In 2006, Hershey's began selling Hershey's Special Dark Miniatures, which included the plain Special Dark bar, along with dark bars with peanuts (similar to a Mr. Goodbar) and with crisped rice (similar to a Krackel).

== Hershey's Extra Dark ==
Hershey's Extra Dark, a product very similar to the Special Dark, was introduced in 2009, and discontinued in 2012. Three varieties produced were solid chocolate; chocolate with macadamia nuts and dried cranberries; and chocolate with cranberries, blueberries, pomegranate, and almonds. Hershey's marketing emphasized the antioxidant qualities of these bars' ingredients. Additionally, Hershey's Extra Dark contained 60% cocoa solids, while Hershey's Special Dark contains 45% cocoa solids.

== Ingredients ==
Special Dark is similar to a standard Hershey bar, but is made with a dark (or semi-sweet) variety of chocolate, and contains a higher percentage (45%) of cocoa solids, chocolate liquor and cocoa butter than milk chocolate.

Full ingredients include: Sugar, Chocolate, Cocoa Butter, Cocoa Processed With Alkali, Milk Fat; Lactose (Milk), Soy Lecithin, PGPR [= https://en.wikipedia.org/wiki/Polyglycerol_polyricinoleate], Natural Flavor, Milk
