= Drops (confectionery) =

Type of confectionery

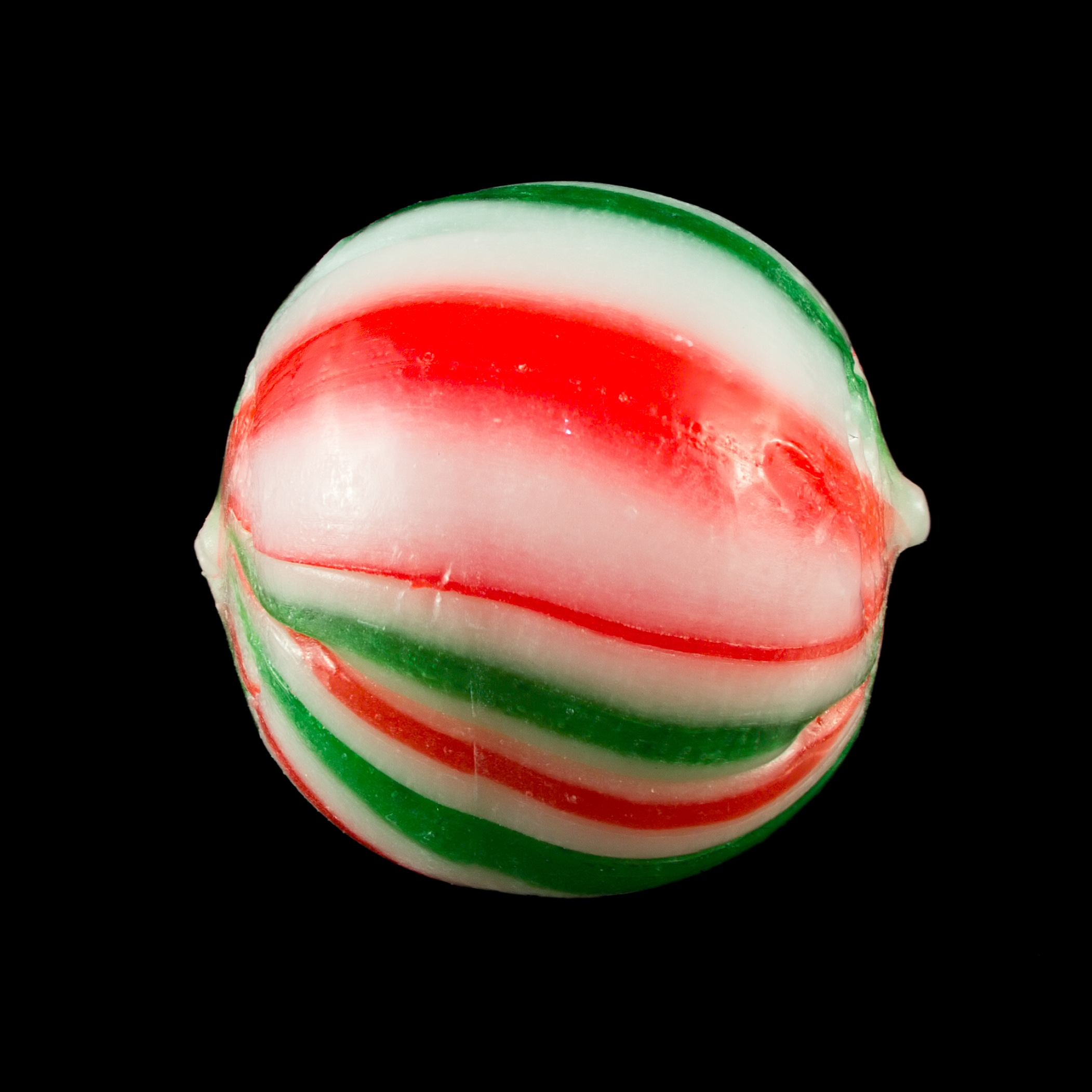
Christmas Starlight Candy, in Canada

Drops are a traditional small, round confectionery made from a mixture of boiled sugar and flavourings. They are "dropped" onto a pan or baking sheet to set. In the 1840s, drop roller machines came on the market. These machines took the hot, 120 °C, cooked sugar, and molded it into shapes between two hand cranked brass rollers.

== See also ==
- Acid drop
- Chocolate drop
- Comfit
- Cough drop
- Fruit drop
- Gumdrop
- Kisses (confectionery)
- Lemon drop
- London drops
- Pear drop
- Sponge drop
