= Hershey's Kisses =

Chocolate candy brand manufactured by the Hershey Company

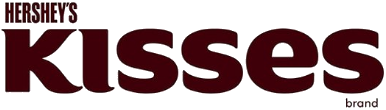

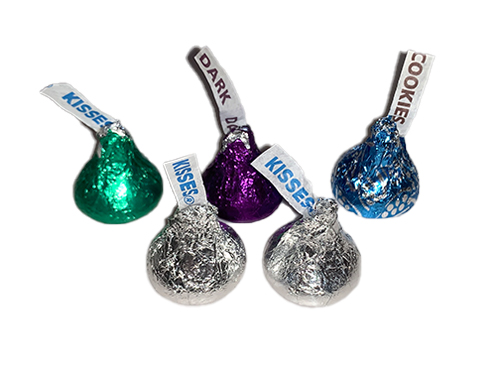
- Hershey's Kisses in foil wrappers. The paper strip coming out the top identifies each flavor.
- Product type: Chocolate candy
- Current owner: The Hershey Company
- Produced by: The Hershey Company
- Country: United States
- Introduced: 1907; 119 years ago
- Related brands: Hershey bar Hershey's Cookies 'n' Creme
- Markets: Worldwide
- Ambassador: Milton Hershey
- Tagline: Say it with a Kiss
- Website: hersheyland.com/kisses

Hershey's Kisses are chocolate kisses first produced by the Hershey Company in 1907. The bite-sized pieces of chocolate have a distinctive conical shape, sometimes described as flat-bottomed teardrops. Hershey's Kisses chocolates are wrapped in squares of lightweight aluminum foil. A narrow strip of paper, called a plume, protrudes from the top of each Hershey's Kiss wrapper. Originally designed as a flag for the "Hershey's" brand, the printed paper plumes were added to the Kisses product wrapper in 1921 to distinguish the Hershey's Kiss from its competitors who were offering similar products.

== History ==
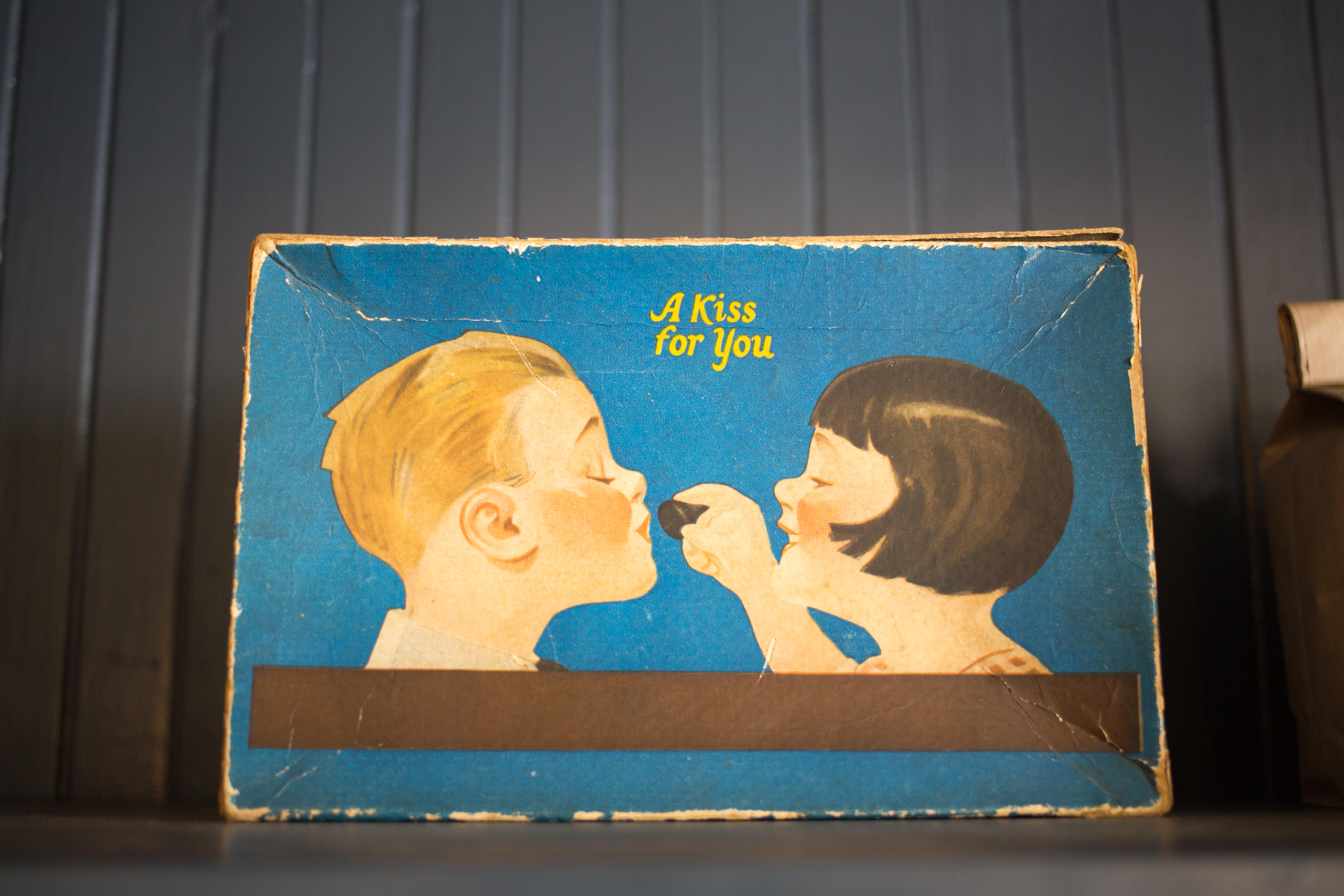
An old Hershey's Kisses advertisement

In 1924, Milton S. Hershey received a registered design trademark (Reg. 0186828) for "foil wrapped conical configuration with plume", which included the Hershey's paper plume sticking out from the top of the aluminum foil wrapper

When first manufactured in 1907, Hershey's Kisses were wrapped by hand. In 1921, a machine was used so the Kisses would be wrapped automatically. This machinery also added the paper plume or paper strip flag to the aluminum foil wrapper to identify Hershey's Kisses, replacing the original small square of printed tissue that was inside the foil wrapper.

In 1924, Milton S. Hershey received a registered design trademark (Reg. 0186828) for "foil wrapped conical configuration with plume" which included the paper plume sticking out from the top of the aluminum foil wrapper. In 1976, Hershey received a registered trademark for the Hershey's Kisses foil wrapper.

During 1942, production of Hershey's Kisses was briefly interrupted due to the rationing of aluminum foil. Instead, the machines were re-purposed to create military chocolate D ration bars for the soldiers in World War II. By the end of World War II, Hershey's had produced more than three billion D ration chocolate bars.

== Popularity ==
Kisses are one of the most popular brands of candies in the US. In 1989, the chocolate drops were the fifth-most popular chocolate brand in the United States, spawning sales that topped $400 million. More than 70 million Hershey's Kisses chocolates are produced each day at the company's two factories. Today's Kisses brand chocolates use Hershey's original milk chocolate formula.

== Kisses brand varieties ==
Hershey's Kisses filled with caramel

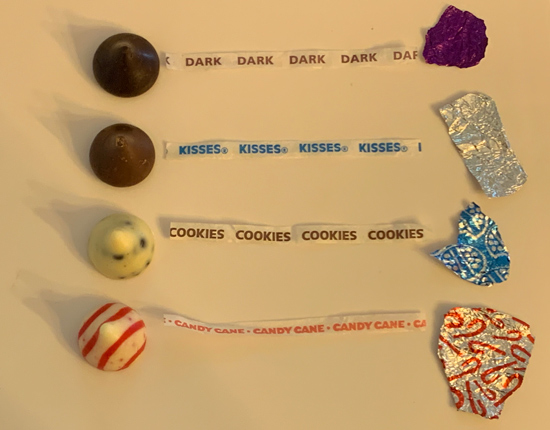
Unwrapped Hershey's Kisses flavor varieties next to their paper plume label and portion of aluminum wrapper

Though originally made of solely milk chocolate, many variations of the Kisses brand of chocolates and candies have since been introduced. Hershey introduces and discontinues new Kisses flavors constantly as part of its standard Kisses offering, including holidays. In addition to the standard milk chocolate, year-round varieties include caramel, Special Dark, hazelnut (deluxe), birthday cake, cookies'n'cream, milk chocolate almond, and white chocolate (Hugs). Seasonal varieties include cherry cordial, hot cocoa, mint truffle, sugar cookie, candy cane, lava cake, "vampire" milk chocolate with strawberry creme and Kisses Special Selections milk chocolate with strawberry creme, truffle creme, yogurt, and mocha cream.

== Discontinued and limited-edition Kisses ==
Throughout the years, Hershey's has created many different flavors of kisses, most of which are currently discontinued. The following list, updated in December 2021, is not necessarily exhaustive.

=== Hershey's Kissables ===
Introduced in late 2005, these mini candy-coated milk chocolate kisses were similar to M&M's and Reese's Pieces. Colors included red, orange, yellow, green, and blue, as well as pastels for Easter, pink, red, and white for Valentine's Day, and red, purple, and brown Special Dark Kissables. In 2008, Hershey's attempted to cut production costs by changing the recipe for these (and other chocolates), opting to use vegetable oils instead of cocoa butter. Customers were not pleased and this change ultimately led to the death of Kissables in July 2009.

=== Candy Corn Kisses ===
These candy corn limited edition Halloween kisses were introduced in 2007, and had three layers of white chocolate flavored candy; yellow on bottom, orange in the middle, and a white tip. Discontinued in 2011, Hershey's opted not to bring them back for future Halloweens due to poor sales.

=== Strawberry Ice Cream Cone Kisses ===
This limited edition flavor was only available for a few months around Easter 2021. Strawberry Ice Cream Cone kisses were available for purchase as of July 2022 at Hershey's Chocolate World.

=== Pumpkin Spice Kisses ===
Released in fall of 2008, shortly following Hershey's Kiss 100th anniversary, this limited edition candy was well received by the public. The kisses had a pumpkin spice scent; comparable to that of snickerdoodles or ginger snaps. The orange kiss was filled with a white pumpkin-flavored creme, and wrapped in a special gold and brown foil wrapper.

== Wrapper history and varieties ==
When introduced in 1907, Hershey's Kisses chocolates originally were wrapped by hand. The automated wrapping machinery was introduced in 1921.

The original wrapper was silver-colored foil and Hershey's Kisses were only available in this single color for decades. In 1962, Hershey became one of the first companies to change its wrappers for seasonal sales. That was the first year that Kisses chocolates were available in different colored foil wrappers: red, green, and silver-wrapped candies were manufactured to coincide with the Christmas season. This idea was the suggestion of John Figi, owner of Figi's "Gifts in Good Taste"—a mail-order food gifts company based in Marshfield, Wisconsin. The green and red colored wrapped chocolates were featured for the first time in the Figi's Christmas catalog.

In 1968, pastel blue, pink, and green wrappers were introduced for Easter, and in 1986, Valentine's Day-themed wrappers of red and silver were introduced. Xs and Os have also appeared on pink and red wrappers as well as little red hearts on silver wrappers for Valentine's Day. "Fall Harvest" colors were introduced in 1991. Independence Day has silver with red stripes and blue-starred wrappers. Pink wrappers with "ribbons" on them to support breast cancer research have also appeared. Camouflage wrappers are also available, primarily on military bases. Kisses Dark Chocolates come in a deep purple wrapper. The Halloween themed Kisses Candy Corn candies come in a wrapper whose colors imitate the color of a candy corn with yellow, white and orange stripes swirling around the candy.

In 2016, four limited Holiday wrapper varieties were released: Santa hats, Kissmas sweaters that resemble knit Christmas sweaters, Kissmas Trees with plumes that read "Fa La La", and "Kissmas" Presents with plumes that read from me to you. The Christmas themed Kisses Candy Cane candies also come in a wrapper whose colors imitate the color pattern (red stripes and white chocolate). The original silver (for regular) and gold (for almonds) wrappers are available year-round.

== Paper plume ==
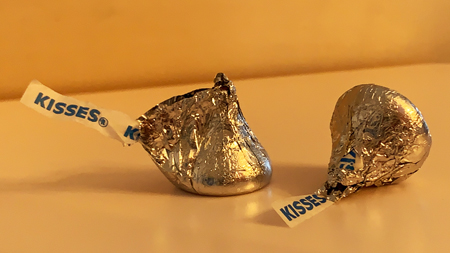
The "KISSES" paper strip plume and silver aluminum foil are the traditional packaging for the Hershey's Milk Chocolate Kiss

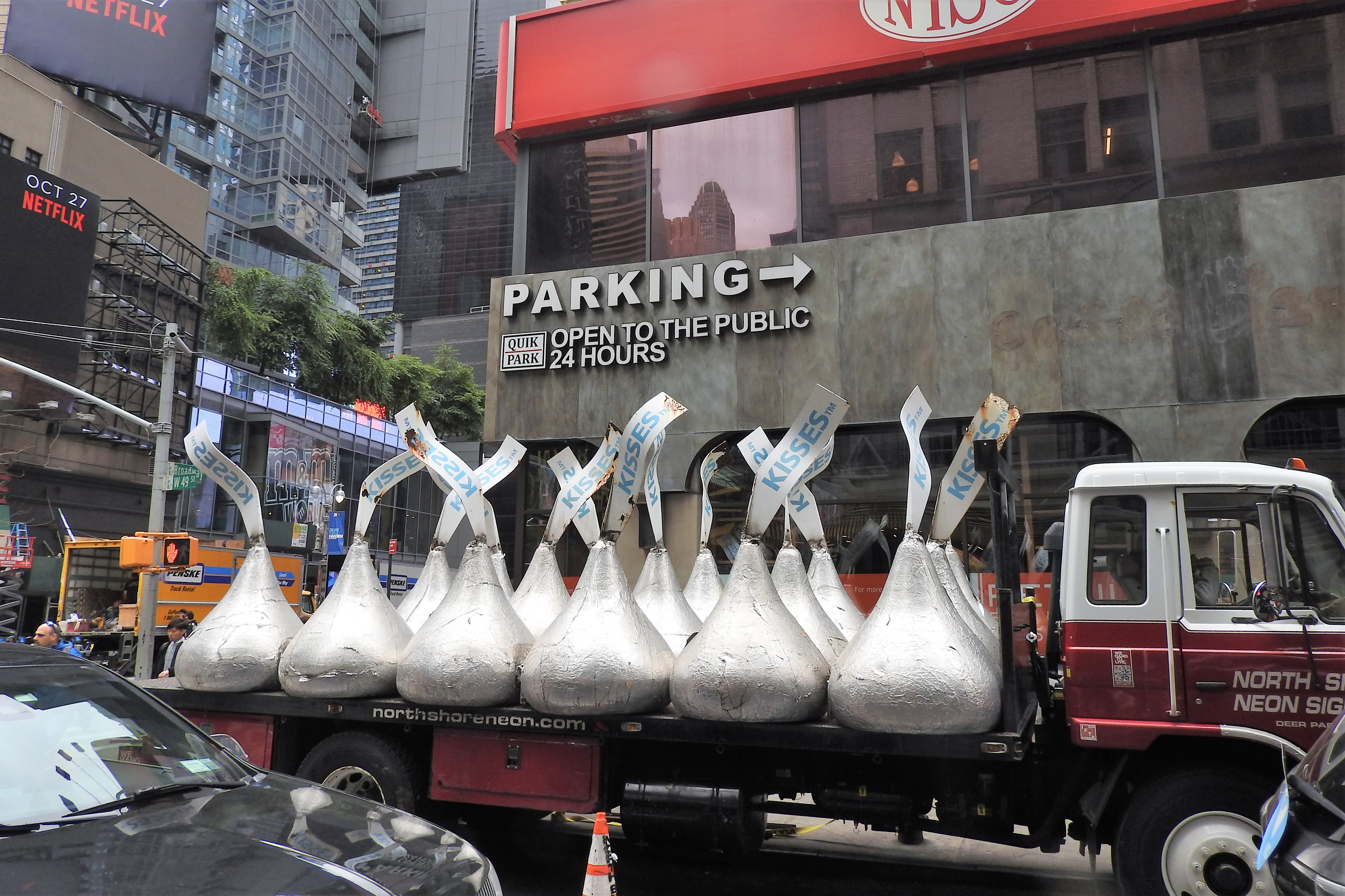
"When the candy is bigger, the plume is bigger"

All Kisses wrappers have a food-safe paper strip called a plume as an identification tag sticking from the top of the foil wrapper. When the paper plume was added to the Kisses wrapper in 1921, originally it was a flag for the "Hershey's" brand, distinguishing Hershey's Kisses from its competitors.

== Advertising ==
"Christmas Bells" is a long-running commercial in which Hershey's Kisses, fashioned as a handbell choir, perform the Christmas carol "We Wish You a Merry Christmas". The advertisement premiered in 1989 and has run each holiday season since in the United States, representing the longest-running television commercial for the Hershey brand. In 2020, Hershey's introduced a new "Bells to Blossoms" version of the ad, in which one of the candies is removed from the choir and used to make cookies, but was criticized for changing a 30-year running holiday tradition. The company made the decision to air both the "classic" and newer versions of the holiday ad throughout the holiday season.

== Ingredients and nutrition information ==
Beginning with its own consumer research into product information, in 2015 Hershey led the SmartLabel initiative. Hershey's was the first brand to adopt this Grocery Manufacturers Association mobile-scannable packaging standard.

Kisses ingredients are cane sugar, milk, chocolate, cocoa butter, milk fat, lecithin, and natural flavor. A 1.45-ounce (41.1 g) serving of Hershey's Kisses consists of seven Kisses pieces. Kisses has the following nutrition information:

- 200 Calories
- Total fat 12g
- Saturated fat 7g
- Trans fat 0g
- Cholesterol 10 mg
- Sodium 35 mg
- Total carbohydrate 25g
- Dietary fiber 1g
- Total sugars 23g
- Protein 3g
- Vitamin D 25.8 iu
- Calcium 80.8 mg
- Iron 1.4 mg
- Potassium 147.7 mg

=== Additives ===
Hershey's Hugs and Hershey's Kisses Cookies 'N' Creme are made with the ingredient PGPR (Polyglycerol polyricinoleate, E476), which is used as a cheaper replacement for cocoa butter.
