= Kisses (confectionery) =

Various items of small sugar confectionery

Kisses is a term used in the United States and Canada to describe various items of small confectionery, defined by a conical teardrop shape as if it were kissed on the top. The most famous brand using this name is Hershey's Kisses, which were first produced in the US in 1907. It is sometimes applied to confections with a hard exterior and a soft filling, such as chocolate-dipped marshmallows, or two small biscuits or cookies sandwiched together with a soft icing. There are corresponding terms in other countries, such as the Italian bocconetti di mandorla (almond kisses) and the Indian cool kiss.

== History of kisses candy (United States) ==
In the US, kisses were a common name for candy bits around the turn of the 20th century. By 1910, the Annual Report of the Pennsylvania Department of Agriculture shows that its chemists had analyzed the ingredients of 13 individual chocolate confections it categorized as "kisses". Nor were kisses candy only made of chocolate. In 1915, the Novelty Candy Company was offering three flavors of kisses – cinnamon, molasses and nut butter – according to the International Confectioner.

In the early 1920s advances in wrapping equipment specifically for chocolate kiss foil wrapping allowed companies like Hershey's to differentiate its chocolate kiss product from competitor kiss candy producers. In 1924, Milton S. Hershey received a registered design trademark (Reg. No. 0186828) for "foil wrapped conical configuration with plume". This parchment paper plume was printed with the "Hershey's" name and stuck out from the top of the aluminum foil wrapper. It allowed customers to distinguish the Hershey kiss from other chocolate kisses.

Other Hershey kisses trademarks followed until The Hershey Company was awarded trademark registration number 2416701 in January 2001 for the name KISSES.

== See also ==
- Drops (confectionery)
