= Symphony (candy) =

Chocolate bar by Hershey's

Hershey's Symphony Bar

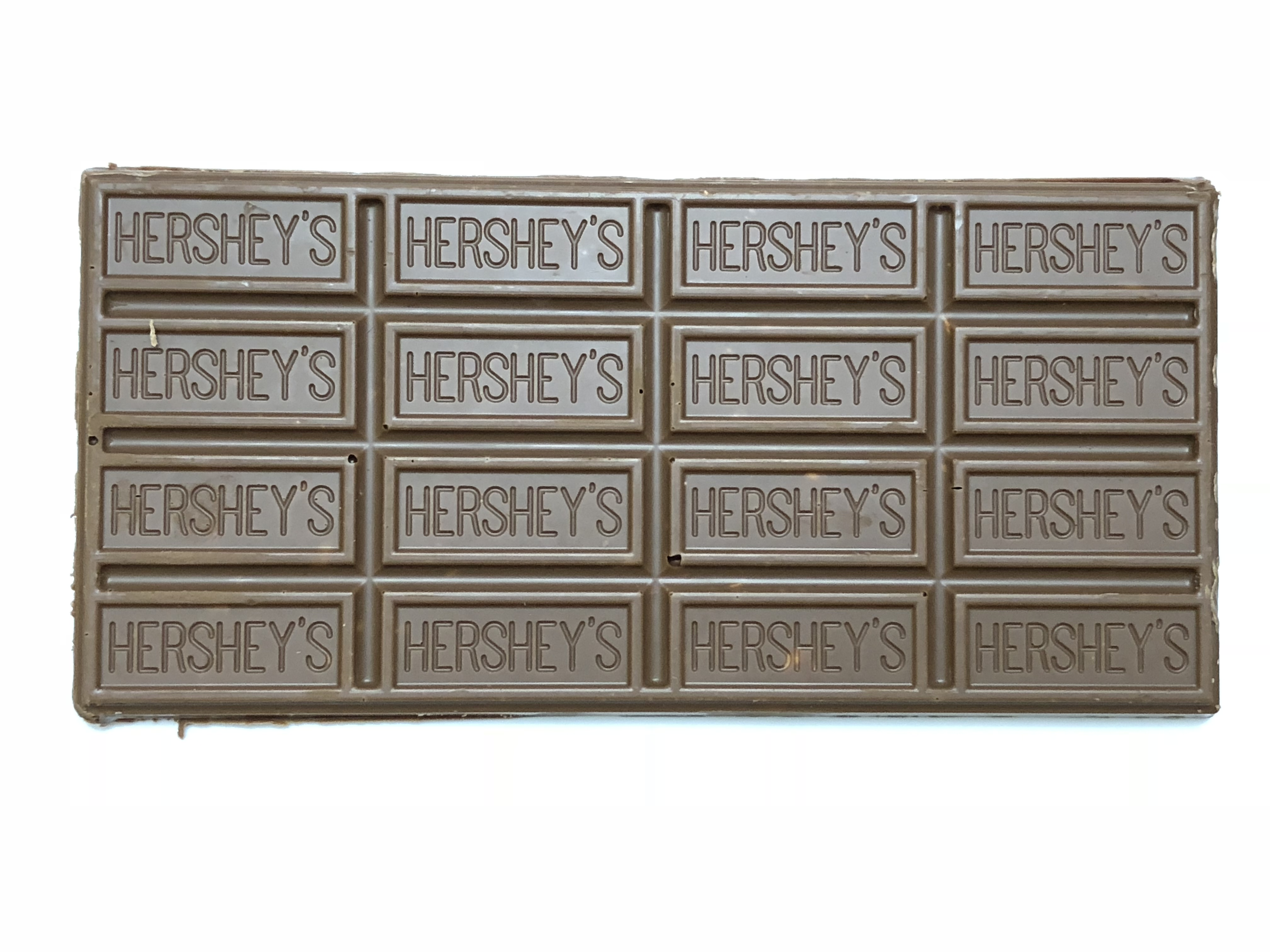
- A larger milk chocolate bar with the same original ingredients, but with different amounts to create a creamy version of the original milk chocolate bar.
- Product type: Chocolate bar
- Current owner: The Hershey Company
- Country: United States
- Introduced: 1989; 37 years ago
- Markets: Worldwide
- Tagline: There'll never be another unfinished Symphony
- Website: hersheyland.com/symphony-milk-chocolate-candy-bar/

Symphony is the name of two varieties of chocolate bars made by The Hershey Company under the Hershey brand name. The milk chocolate contains the identical ingredients used in the regular chocolate bars made by Hershey's, but have varying amounts of some ingredients (specifically cocoa butter, chocolate and lactose) in order to give a creamier flavor. Introduced in 1989, the Symphony bar has remained in production today (unlike the Mild and Mellow bar introduced in 1934 and dropped from production in 1941). These are two of the Hershey chocolate candy bars that are a departure from Hershey's original milk chocolate recipe which was designed by Milton Hershey in 1894.

The name "Symphony" is given to the bars because it is supposed to be a treat to the mouth in the same way music is to the ears.

== History ==
Symphony was developed after research began in 1984. Prior to its release to the general public, it was first testmarketed in the Los Angeles and San Francisco areas. It was targeted to a more mature audience including the middle- and upper-class consumers.

It was found to be the most preferred of nine products test-marketed by Hershey's in China.

== Advertising ==
Symphony was introduced with the first ads featuring classical music and the tagline: “There will never be another unfinished Symphony.” Symphony was launched in two varieties: Milk Chocolate (sometimes called the "plain" version) and Milk Chocolate with Almonds and Toffee (which contains almonds and toffee chips).
