= Mr. Goodbar =

Chocolate candy bar

Hershey's Mr. Goodbar
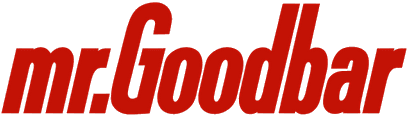

- A chocolate candy bar containing peanuts.
- Product type: Chocolate Bar
- Current owner: The Hershey Company
- Produced by: The Hershey Company
- Country: United States
- Introduced: 1925; 101 years ago
- Related brands: Hershey bar
- Markets: Worldwide
- Tagline: A Nuttier Bar for Nuttier Times; Good Peanuts and Good Chocolate make a very Good Bar; Quick Energy in Every Bar; That's a Good Bar
- Website: hersheyland.com/mrgoodbar

Mr. Goodbar is a candy bar containing peanuts and chocolate, whose packaging is identifiable by its yellow background and red text. It is manufactured by The Hershey Company and was introduced in 1925.

== History ==
Although the Hershey Milk Chocolate Bar with Almonds had been produced since 1908, Milton Hershey initially did not want the Hershey brand name associated with a chocolate bar that contained peanuts, so it was introduced as being produced by the "Chocolate Sales Corporation" (a fictitious company name created by William Murrie). It is currently available both as an individual product and as one of the varieties of Hershey's Miniatures.

During the Great Depression, sales of Hershey's products dropped by fifty percent. Milton Hershey, determined not to let it affect his employees and the town he created for them, refused advice to lay off workers. Instead, he directed the company to find an alternate means of bolstering revenue. The company began a marketing campaign promoting the candy bar as a protein-rich meal due to the peanuts it contained. Coupled with a new price of two bars for a nickel, reduced work hours and cancelled bonuses, The Hershey Company came out of the Depression in a strong position, and by 1936, profits had reached a level ten times that of the company payroll.

== Ingredient changes to reduce production costs ==
The formula was modified in 1995 to add more peanuts.

In 2008, Hershey replaced cocoa butter with cheaper oil substitutes. Hershey changed the description of the product and altered the packaging slightly along with the ingredients. Though the formula contained chocolate, according to United States Food and Drug Administration food labeling laws, these modified recipes that do not contain cocoa butter cannot be legally described as milk chocolate.
