= Christmas Bells (advertisement) =

1989 American television commercial

- Scene from the 2012 version of the advertisement
- Directed by: Carl Willat
- Production company: Colossal Pictures (1989 version)
- Distributed by: The Hershey Company
- Release date: December 1989
- Running time: 15 seconds
- Country: United States

"Christmas Bells" is an American television commercial produced by the Hershey Company promoting Hershey's Kisses. The advertisement, originally produced with stop-motion animation and later being redone with CGI animation, features Hershey's Kisses, fashioned as a handbell choir, playing the Christmas carol "We Wish You a Merry Christmas". It debuted in December 1989 and is shown in the United States and Canada each holiday season; as such, it is the longest-running television commercial for the Hershey brand. In 2012, the ad was redone with a new recording of the audio and the graphics being redone entirely in CGI animation. Since then, that version had been the version playing each year up until October 2019, when the slogan in the video was slightly updated from "Happy Holidays from Hershey's Kisses" to "Warmest Holidays from Hershey's Kisses", in addition to having the red Kiss that makes the last note pulse red upon finishing.

A new version of the commercial was introduced on November 23, 2020. This version depicted the hand of a little girl reaching into frame and taking the red Kiss that plays the last note (this part is a combination of CGI and live action), and using it with her father in baking cookies. However, the new version was met with backlash mainly for being changed. The company did respond to the backlash, announcing that both versions would be aired. A third version aired a month later, mainly in Canada, in response to the controversy, in which the red Kiss that was taken by the girl is missing, but quickly hops into frame to play the last note, much to the delight of its fellow Kisses with the slogan "We're at our best when we're together".

== Background ==
In 1989, the Hershey Company began an advertising campaign for their product Hershey's Kisses, which was referred to as the "whimsy" campaign. Ogilvy & Mather was the advertising agency behind the spot and David Apicella served as Creative Director. Television advertisements would utilize "tabletop stop-motion animation and CG product photography." Colossal Pictures was the animation studio who produced the commercial. Carl Willat directed the spots and performed the stop-motion animation with Gordon Clark. John Dunn, Hershey's brands manager, oversaw the production and helped develop the last-minute idea to create the "Christmas Bells" advertisement. Leah Longan, former marketing director for Hershey, told the New York Times in 1994 they continued to run the advertisement because they "don't wear out like normal commercials," as they are only shown seasonally.
