= Krackel =

Hershey chocolate bar

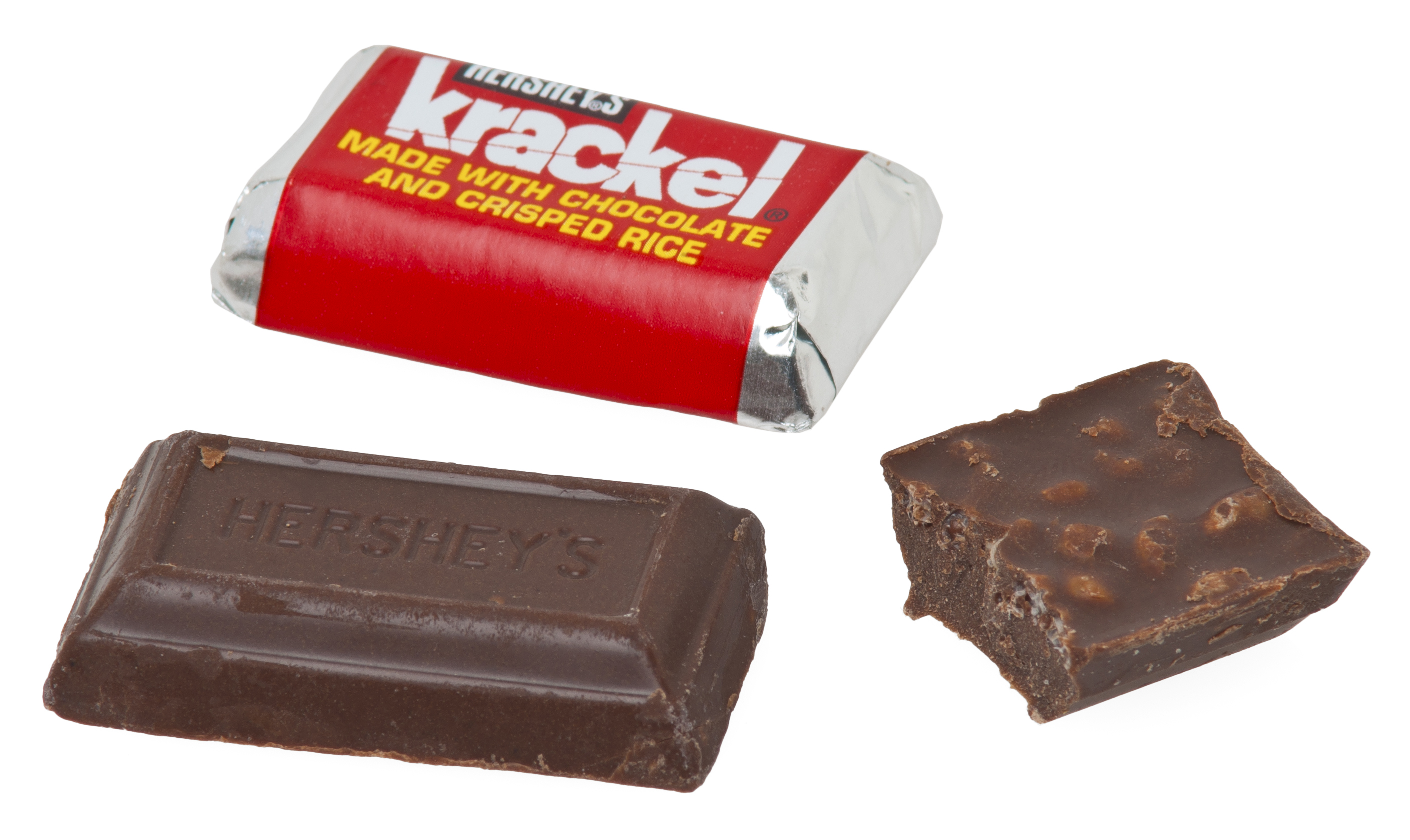
- A candy bar with oven popped rice coated in milk chocolate.
- Type: Chocolate bar
- Inventor: The Hershey Company
- Inception: 1938; 88 years ago
- Manufacturer: The Hershey Company
- Current supplier: The Hershey Company
- Website: hersheyland.com/hershey-miniatures-krackel-assortment

Krackel is a chocolate bar with crisped rice pieces made by The Hershey Company and first introduced on September 14, 1938.

== Overview ==
Krackel contains milk chocolate and crisped rice. Krackel originally sold as an individual chocolate bar product until 1997, and for 17 years it was available only as one of the four varieties of Hershey's Miniatures until it was reintroduced as an individual candy bar in 2014. The full-sized version has since been discontinued again, and it is now available only in the miniature version.

== Ingredients ==
Introduced in 1938, Krackel used to have almonds in its formula, until peanuts were then added in the recipe in 1939, but both the almonds and peanuts were removed in 1941 to be replaced with the new crisped rice balls that measure about 2 mm in diameter. The full-sized 4.5-ounce Krackel chocolate bar reintroduced in 2014 contained roughly the same ingredients. Although its ingredients typically do not contain gluten, Hershey does not list Krackel as gluten free, in part because grains can be contaminated with other, gluten-containing ones accidentally.

== Packaging ==
The product's packaging can be identified by its distinctive red background, white lettering, and yellow fine print. In 2014, as part of a company-wide sustainability program, Krackel wrappers, as well as the other Hershey chocolate miniatures, underwent a makeover said to save an estimated 270,000 pounds of paper per year or an estimated 1,950 trees annually.

== See also ==
- Crunch (chocolate bar)
- List of chocolate bar brands
