= Hershey's Cookies 'n' Creme =

Candy bar

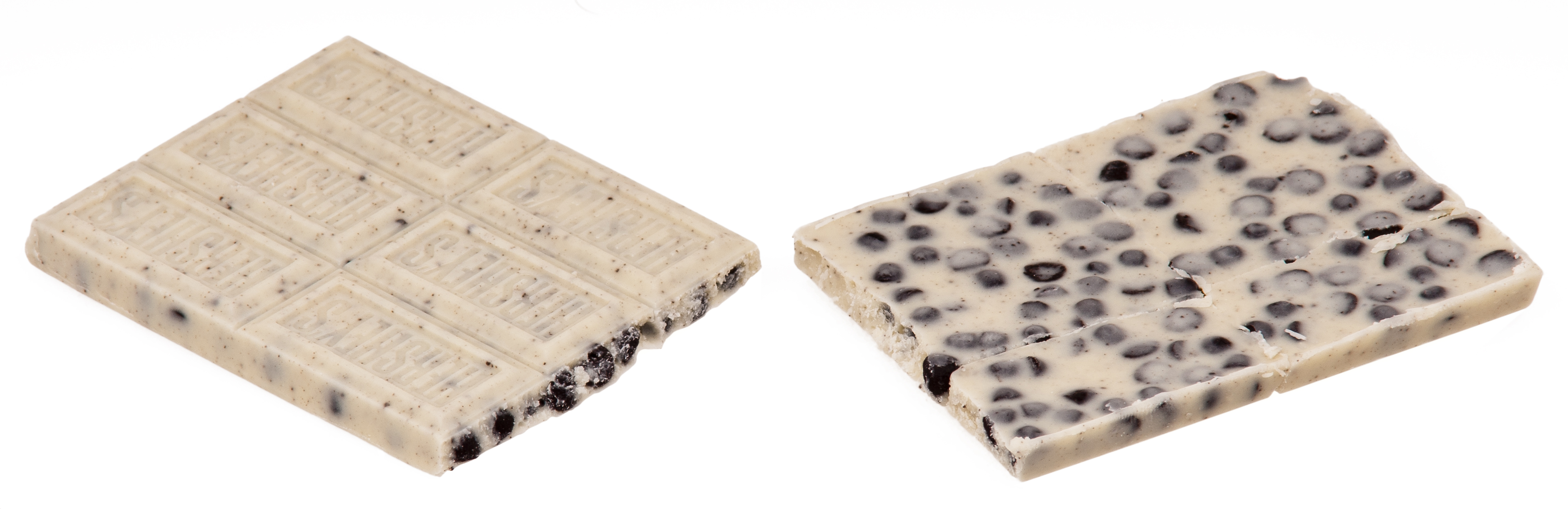
- Hershey's Cookies 'n' Creme candy bar is made with chocolate cookie bits and white creme
- Type: Candy bar
- Inventor: The Hershey Company
- Inception: 1994; 32 years ago
- Manufacturer: The Hershey Company
- Available: Available in United States, United Kingdom, Canada
- Current supplier: The Hershey Company
- Models: Bar, snack size pieces, drops
- Website: https://www.hersheyland.com/hersheys-cookies-n-creme

Hershey's Cookies 'n' Creme is a candy bar manufactured by The Hershey Company and first introduced in 1994.

== Product variations ==
Hershey's Cookies 'n' Creme is a flat, white crème candy bar containing small, uniformly shaped chocolate cookie bits. The standard-sized bar has 12 rectangular blocks arranged in a 3X4 grid. The XL variant of the bar is thicker than the original and has 16 rectangular blocks arranged in a 4X4 grid. Similar Cookies 'n' Creme candies manufactured by Hershey were released as Hershey's Drops in 2010. Hershey's also released the Giant variant, which is significantly thicker than the XL and has the rectangular blocks placed in a 5X5 grid. In 2020, Hershey’s released new related candy bars in Canada: Strawberries ‘N’ Creme (a re-release from 2005) and Cookies ‘N’ Mint.

In celebration of the July 4th holiday, Hershey introduced a special variation of their Cookies ‘N’ Creme product, featuring a distinctive red, white, and blue wrapper. This commemorative edition was repeated in honor of Independence Day in 2021. Notably, the packaging underwent a transformation from its original all-white design to a cream-colored appearance, adorned with subtle blue accents along the packaging's sides. Hershey's Cookies 'n' Creme holds a unique position as one of the select Hershey's chocolate offerings available for purchase in the United Kingdom.

== Recipe change ==
In 2008, The Hershey Company changed the ingredients of some of its products in order to replace the relatively expensive cocoa butter with oil substitutes. As a result, the packaging no longer states that the bar contains white chocolate.

== Ingredients ==
The ingredients include sugar, vegetable oil (cocoa butter, palm oil, shea oil, and sunflower and/or safflower oil), nonfat milk, corn syrup solids, enriched wheat flour (flour, niacin, ferrous sulfate, thiamin mononitrate, riboflavin, and folic acid), milkfat, partially hydrogenated vegetable oil (soybean and/or cottonseed oil). It also contains 2% or less of: cocoa processed with alkali, whey (milk), chocolate, soy lecithin, high-fructose corn syrup, sodium bicarbonate, salt, natural and artificial flavor, tocopherols (to maintain freshness), PGPR, emulsifier, and caramel color.

== Nutrition information ==
Hershey's Cookies 'n' Creme candy bar
Nutritional value per 100 g (3.5 oz)
- Energy: 962.32 kJ (230.00 kcal)
- Carbohydrates: 28 g
- Sugars: 21 g
- Fat: 12 g
- Saturated: 7 g
- Trans: 0 g
- Protein: 3 g
Vitamins and minerals
Vitamins	Quantity %DV^{†}
Vitamin D	3% 21.2 IU
Minerals	Quantity %DV^{†}
Calcium	7% 85.9 mg
Iron	3% 0.5 mg
Potassium	5% 150 mg
Sodium	5% 105 mg
- Other constituents: Quantity
- Cholesterol: <5 mg
- Serving size is 1 1.55oz (or 43 g) bar
- ^{†}Percentages estimated using US recommendations for adults, except for potassium, which is estimated based on expert recommendation from the National Academies. Source: Smart Label

== Certifications ==
The Hershey's Cookies 'n' Creme candy bar is OU-D certified, indicating it is a Kosher Dairy product.

== Cereal ==
A box of Hershey's Cookies 'n' Creme cereal at a convenience store.

On July 5, 2013, Hershey's Cookies 'n' Creme cereal was released in the United States by General Mills.

== See also ==
- Cookies and cream
